= Allos =

- Commune
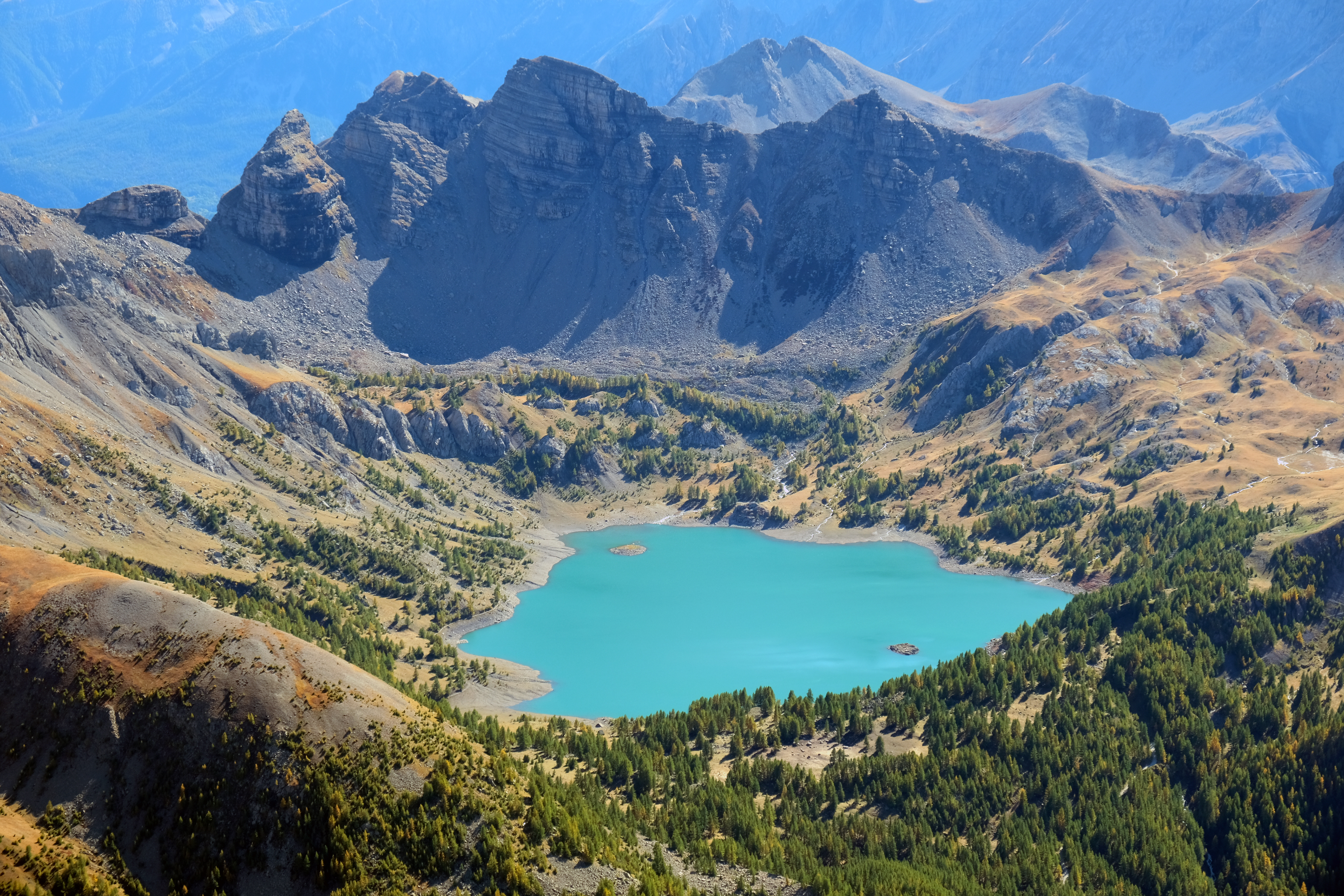
- The Lac d'Allos

- Coat of arms
- Location of Allos
- Location within France Location within Provence-Alpes-Côte d'Azur
- Coordinates: 44°14′28″N 6°37′43″E
- Country: France
- Region: Provence-Alpes-Côte d'Azur
- Department: Alpes-de-Haute-Provence
- Arrondissement: Castellane
- Canton: Castellane
- Intercommunality: Alpes Provence Verdon - Sources de Lumière

Government
  - Mayor (2026–32): Sylvain Barbotin
- Area^{1}: 116.65 km^{2} (45.04 sq mi)
- Elevation: 1,425 m (4,675 ft)
- Highest elevation: 3,040 m (9,970 ft)
- Lowest elevation: 1,339 m (4,393 ft)
- Population (2023): 812
  - Density: 6.96/km^{2} (18.0/sq mi)
- Time zone: UTC+01:00 (CET)
  - Summer (DST): UTC+02:00 (CEST)
- INSEE/Postal code: 04006 /04260
- ^{1} French Land Register data, which excludes lakes, ponds, glaciers > 1 km^{2} (0.386 sq mi or 247 acres) and river estuaries.

Allos (French pronunciation: [alɔs]; Occitan: Alòs) is a commune in the Alpes-de-Haute-Provence department in the Provence-Alpes-Côte d'Azur region of southeastern France.

Allos is a high mountain commune in the southern Alps. The commune experienced a significant rural exodus in the 19th century, following the population movement of the department. Then the town was overwhelmed for eighty years by winter sports: the construction of accommodations and ski-lifts has changed the landscape and the mountain urbanisation. The economy was profoundly altered with almost all jobs being found in tourism. Traditional agricultural activities persisted only marginally.

Historically Allos, located in the valley of the Verdon, has long been linked to the Ubaye Valley: first at the time when Ubaye belonged to the States of Savoy (from 1388 to 1713) then after it became part of France it continued to be administered across the Col d'Allos (impassable in winter). Even after the Revolution, it was attached to the Barcelonnette district. It was not until 1985 that it was (administratively) turned towards the valley by accepting the connection to the Canton of Colmars.

== Geography ==
Allos is located some 12 km south of Barcelonnette and some 100 km north-west of Nice at an altitude of 1425 m. The Allos valley is traversed by the Verdon which has its source in the Foux d'Allos in the Sestriere valley at 2500 m altitude.

Access to the commune is by the D908 road: a tortuous road running off the D902 south of Barcelonette which passes through the heart of the commune and the village before continuing south to Colmars.

Located at the edge of the Mercantour National Park, the country of Upper Verdon and the Allos valley offers landscapes with many mountains: from the famous Lac d'Allos (Allos Lake) which is the largest mountain lake in Europe to the waterfall of La Lance, near Colmars-les-Alpes. The flora is varied depending on the altitude: larch, spruce, fir as well as Alpine clematis, peonies, and Martagon.

=== Geology ===
The mountains around Allos are composed of black schist.

=== Relief ===
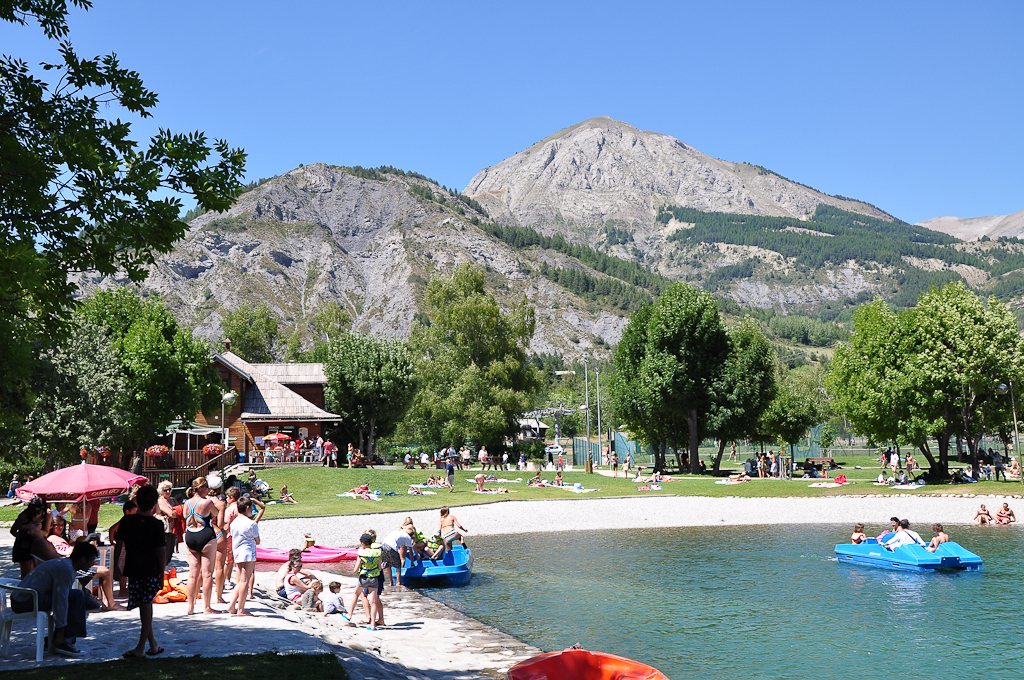
La Roche-Grande, dominating the recreational area.

All around Allos from the Col d'Allos (2247 m, north of the village) and in a clockwise direction:

- on a north-south ridge of the Cheiroueche mountain (2362m) which overlooks the village, the Roche Grande (2409 m), completely denuded of vegetation;
- to the north: the Petit Cheval de Bois (Little Wooden Horse) (2754 m) and the Grand Cheval de Bois (Large Wooden Horse) (2838 m), the Pichs or Nivoulet (2575 m);
- to the east: the Cimet (3020 m), separated from the Teton (2969 m) by the small col de Talon (2678 m), Mount Pelat (3050 m), and between Allos and Mont Pelat the Tête du Vallonnet (Head of Vallonnet) (2710 m) and the Tête de Prachastel (Head of Prachastel) (2320 m);
- around Lake Allos: the Trou de l'Aigle (Hole of the Eagle) (2961 m), the Col de la Petite Cayolle (2639 m), the Garrets summit (2822 m), the Montagne de l'Avalanche (Mountain of Avalanches) (2729 m), the Tete du Lac (Head of the Lake) (2626 m), the group of Tours du Lac (Towers of the Lake) which is five peaks between 2585 and 2745 m, and the Tete de Valplane (Head of Valplane) (2624 m);
- to the South: the Roche Cline (2415 m) and on the right bank of the Verdon the Autapie (2435 m);
- to the west: the Gros Tapie (2371 m), the summit of Valcibière (2375 m), the Mourre Gros (2652 m), the Tete Noire (Black Head) (2560 m), the Tete de l'Auriac (Head of Auriac) (2639 m), the Trois-Évêchés (Three bishoprics) (2818 m), the Tete de la Sestriere (Head of Sestriere) (2575 m);
- to the northwest of the Col d'Allos: the Tete de Vescal (Head of Vescal) (2515 m).

The peaks to the west of Allos belong to the Massif des Trois-Évêchés (Three bishoprics mountains) while to the east are the secondary mountains of Mount Pelat.

=== Environment ===
The town has 1,869 hectares of woods and forests.

=== Hamlets ===
- La Beaumelle;
- La Beaume;
- La Foux;
- La Foux d’Allos;
- Le Seignus (Bas and Haut);
- le Villard (Bas and Haut);
- Le Brec Bas et Haut;
- Sainte-Brigitte (Basse and Haute);
- Le Foreston;
- Bouchiers;
- La Peyrière (Basse and Haute);
- Prémin;
- Montgros;
- Champrichard;
- La Colette;

=== Natural and technological risks ===
None of the 200 communes of the department is in a no-risk seismic area. The commune is in zone 1b (low risk) according to the deterministic classification of 1991 and based on historical earthquakes. It is in Zone 4 (medium risk) according to the ECS probability classification of 2011. Allos commune is also exposed to four other natural hazards: avalanche, forest fire, flooding (in the valley of the Verdon), landslide (the commune is affected by a random medium to high risk in limited areas).

Allos commune is exposed to a risk of technological origin - i.e. the risk of dam breakage on the hill reservoir of Tardée above the Foux-d'Allos ski-station.

The prevention plan for foreseeable natural risks (PPR) for the commune was approved in 1998 for flood risk, landslide, and avalanche; and a Communal Dossier on Major Risks (DICRIM) has existed since 2010.

The commune has been the location of several natural disasters: an earthquake in 1984, flooding and mudslides in 1994 and 2003. In November 2012 a landslide cut off the only access road to the hamlets of Bouchiers and La Colette - a cut that lasted more than seven months.

== Toponymy ==
The locality appears for the first time in texts from 1056 under the name of ad Alodes which means Allods in Occitan. A Pre-Gallic hypothesis has also been considered more in line with local phonetic rules such as Fénié. The name Allos derived then from Al- designating "rocks". The form Alodes would be in this case a bad romanization. The commune is called Alòs in Occitan Vivaro-Alpine dialect.

The name of the station La Foux-d'Allos means "narrow gorges" between the surrounding peaks.

== History ==
The name of the people located in the upper valley of the Verdon is not certain but it may be the Eguiturii. At the end of the Roman Empire the upper valley of the Verdon depended on the civitas and the bishopric of Thorame.

It is possible that the first village was built around Notre-Dame-du-Valvert in the High Middle Ages. It would then have been perched at Banivol before moving lower in the 12th to 13th centuries. The village was cited in 1056 and had its own consulat from 1233, by privilege from the Comte de Provence, and a Fair. Allos belonged to the Counts of Provence until 1388 then, with the Ubaye Valley and Nice, passed to the Counts of Savoy until 1713. From that time until the beginning of the French Revolution Allos was administratively attached to Barcelonnette. The first division of Basses-Alpes included Allos in the Barcelonnette district.

During the Wars of religion the Duke of Lesdiguières bombarded the town without taking it in 1597. He had brought his army through the Col de Thuiles.

The peculiarities of the Allos community, which occupies several deep valleys and whose habitat is dispersed across multiple villages, led to the creation of three parishes in the 17th century: one in La Foux, one in Bouchiers, and one in Baumelle. A large number of chapels were also built: 29 in total throughout history.

Several major fires ravaged the town in 1718, 1747, and 1769.

During the French Revolution the commune had a patriotic society which was created at the end of 1792.

In the 20th century Allos became a tourist town: in 1935, the ski-lifts were built at Seignus and Foux. In the 1970s, when winter sports became mass entertainment, more ski resorts were built in two hamlets. It was not until 1985 qu'Allos turns towards the valley by integrating with the Arrondissement of Castellane.

=== Heraldry ===
Arms of Allos	Blazon: Argent, a demi-vol in gules surmounting a shin-bone in sable posed in fesse.

Canting arms: Allos, in Latin Allosium, in Provençal Alouès. Alo-west Wing-bone.

== Administration ==
List of Successive Mayors

Mayors from 1726 to 1888

From	To	Name	Party	Position
1726		Jean-Hyacinthe Pascalis		
1748		Hyacinthe Pellissier		
1750		Honoré Pascalis		
1751		Pierre-Jacques Pascalis		
1756		Alexandre Pascalis du Laus		
1758		Pierre Pellissier		
1780		Joseph Guirand		
1794	1796	Michel Michel		
1796	1798	Pellissier		
1798	1799	Joseph Caire		
1799	1800	Jacques Gariel		
1800	1801	Guirand		
1801	1802	Alexandre Pellissier		
1802	1803	Jean Honnorat		
1803	1806	Hyacinthe-Marie Gariel		
1806	1813	Augier		
1813	1830	Rebattu		
1830	1840	Jean-Jacques-Laurent Gaubert		
1840	1843	Pierre Pascal		
1843	1846	Hyacinthe Pellat		
1846	1856	Joseph Pellissier		
1856	1886	Désiré Boyer		
1886	1888	Sébastien Reynaud		
1888		Antoine Reynaud		

Mayors from 1971

From	To	Name	Party	Position
1971	1996	René Cèze	RPR	
1996	2014	Michel Lantelme		President of the Haut-Verdon Val d'Allos Community of communes
2014	2015	Chantal Caire-Caïs	DVG	
2015	2020	Marie-Annick Boizard		
2020	2026	Michel Lantelme		
2026	incumbent	Sylvain Barbotin		

The election of the City Council in March 2008 was the subject of an appeal to the administrative court of Marseille; the judgment led to new elections in September.

== Population ==
The inhabitants of the commune are known as Allossards or Allossardes in French.

Historical population
Year	Pop.	±% p.a.
1968	497	—
1975	564	+1.82%
1982	681	+2.73%
1990	705	+0.43%
1999	637	−1.12%
2007	676	+0.75%
2012	648	−0.84%
2017	797	+4.23%
2023	812	+0.31%
Source: INSEE

=== Education ===
The town has had a computerized library since 2004 (See online catalogue) in the Haut-Verdon library network (Communauté de communes du Haut-Verdon-Val-d'Allos) and has two primary schools (one at Allos and one in La Foux d'Allos).

== Economy ==
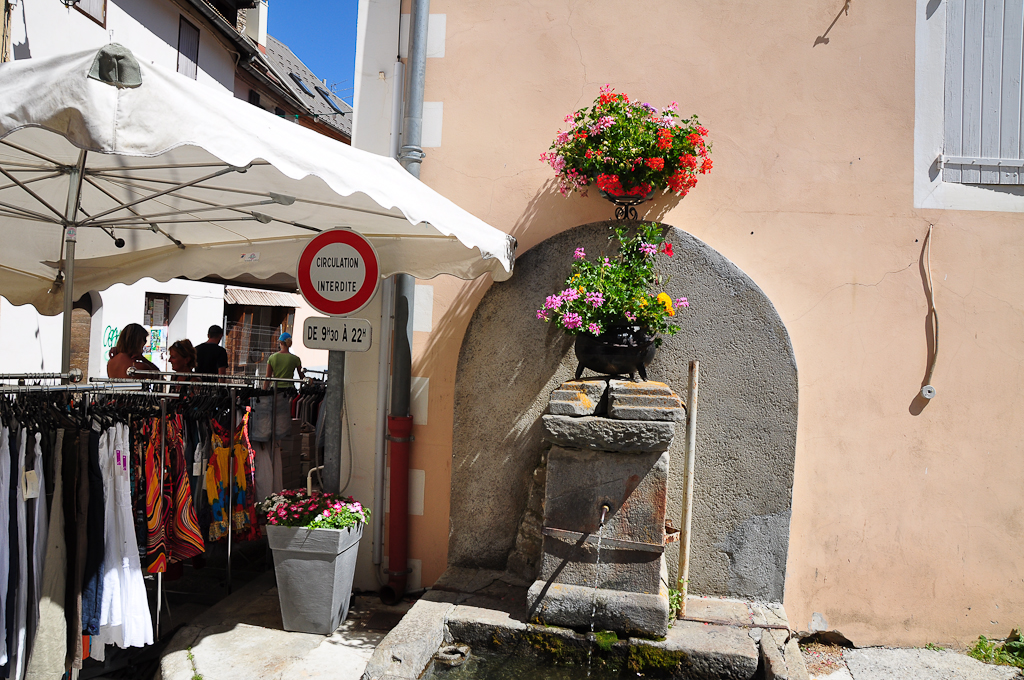
Allos Fountain and market day

=== Overview ===
Allos is a high mountain commune whose main resource is tourism - hiking in the summer - but especially winter sports.

In 2017 the active population was 525 people including 24 unemployed. These workers are mostly employed (66.9%) and the vast majority work in the commune (83%). This can be explained by the predominance of the tourism sector which provides sufficient employment to the people of the commune. As a result, most of the people of the commune work in services and administration (96% at the end of 2015). Industry, construction and agriculture employ 12 people in total.

At the end of 2015 establishments active in the commune were mainly shops and services (372 of 501 establishments) and health and social administrative sector (91).

=== Agriculture ===
At the end of 2015 the primary sector (agriculture, forestry, fisheries) had 9 different establishments with 2 employees.

Most of the survey data from the Ministry of Agriculture are subject to statistical secrecy which indicates low numbers and extent of cultivated land. In 2000 three farms used a utilized agricultural area (UAA) of 281 hectares - the area has been in sharp decline since 1988 (406 hectares).

=== Industry ===
In late 2015 the secondary sector (industry and construction) had 29 establishments mainly crafts (24 companies with no employees). The sector employs 10 people.

=== Service activities ===
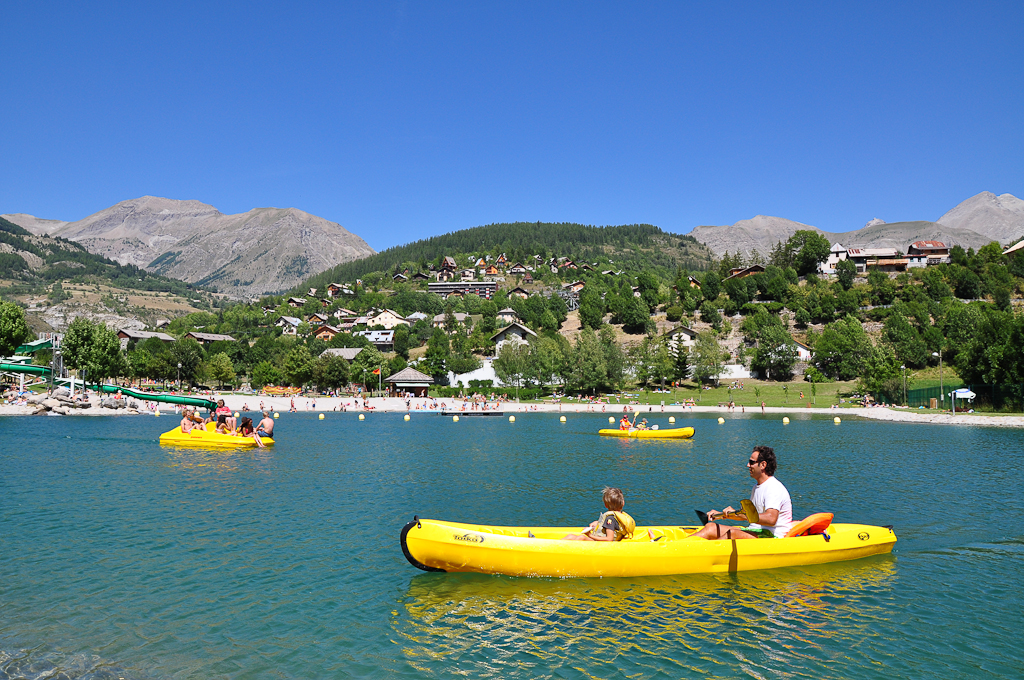
Boating on the Allos water park.

The commune has two ski-stations:

- Val d'Allos-La Foux, which links to the Pra-Loup ski area;
- Val d'Allos-Le Seignus, which is called the village-station because it is connected by Aerial tramway to Allos village.

Summer tourism is also developed with different lakes and mountain walks.

In late 2015 the tertiary sector (trades and services) had 372 establishments (with 286 employees) plus 91 administrative establishments and the health and social sectors (employing 30 people).

According to the Department of Tourism, tourism activity is very important for the commune with more than 5 tourists per resident and with a large capacity for accommodation. Several accommodation facilities for tourists exist in the commune (as of January 2020):

- 10 hotels (3 ranked two stars, and one three-star) with a capacity of 161 beds;
- no camping;
- some furnished, some approved;
- B & Bs are absent from the commune;
- a large carrying capacity in various collective accommodations (summer shelters, youth hostels, holiday villages).

It is nevertheless second homes that weigh more heavily on the capacity with 5,110 second homes (92.6% of the 5,520 dwellings).

== Culture and heritage ==
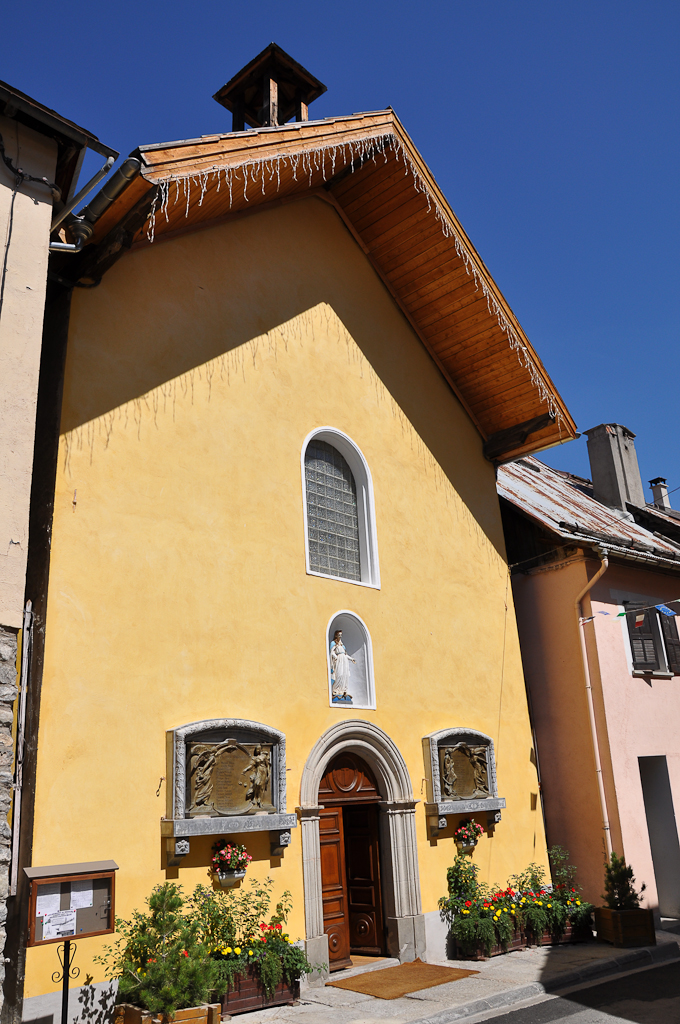
San Sebastian Church or Penitents

The commune contains a very large number of sites that are registered as historical monuments. Lists below are abridged showing the main sites.

There is also a very large number of items registered as historical objects located at:

- The Chapel of Notre-Dame-de-la-Fleur (2 items)
- The Chapel of Notre-Dame-de-la-Salette (1 item)
- The Chapel of Saint-Antoine (11 items)
- The Chapel of Saint-Laurent (8 items)
- The Chapel of Saint Pierre (6 items)
- The Chapel of Saint Sebastian (58 items)
- The Chapel of Sainte-Marie-Madeleine (5 items)
- The Church of Notre-Dame-de-Valvert (59 items)
- The Church of Notre-Dame-de-la-Baumelle (3 items)
- The Chapel of Notre-Dame-de-Lumiere (12 items)
- The Church of Saint John the Baptist (21 items)

=== Civil heritage ===
There are still remnants of medieval structures:

- The City Fortifications (Middle Ages)
- The Banivol Tower (Middle Ages) is 7.2 m square. It may have protected a small town.

Examples of later structures registered as historical monuments:

- The Cooperative Dairy Factory (1931)
- The Abrau Bridge (16th century)
- A Lavoir (Public laundry) (19th century)
- The Town Hall (19th century)

Other sites of interest

- The Ski-station of Foux d'Allos in the classic style of ski-stations with roofs dominated by corrugated iron (mid-1980s) with a presence of roof slate and traditional scale tiles.

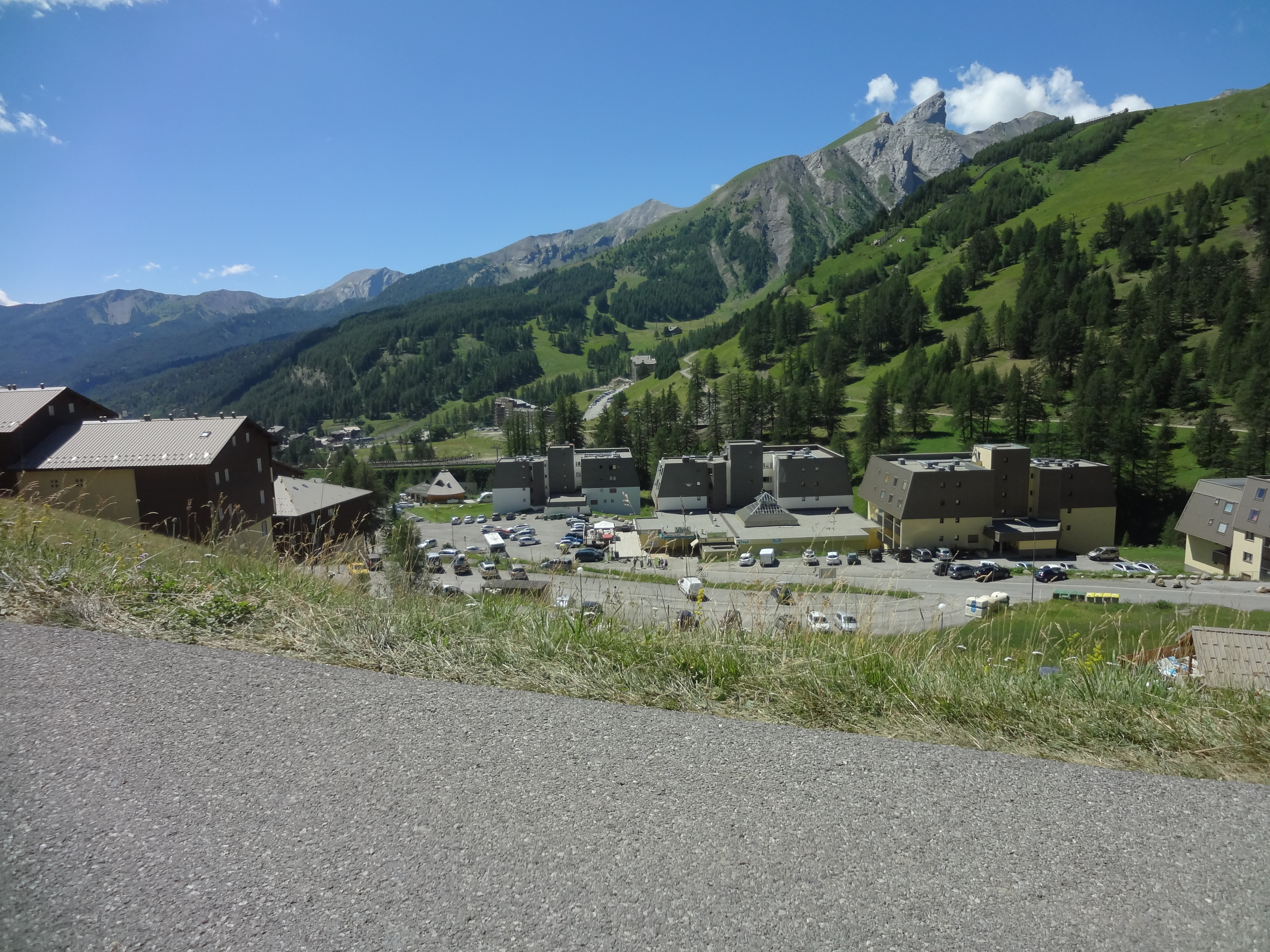
Modern buildings in La Foux d'Allos

- A Sundial in Allos village (1913).

=== Religious monuments ===
The churches and rural chapels are in a simple alpine style imposed by the climate. Notre-Dame-de-Valvert at Allos is a good example from the 13th century.

The extent of the commune with its large population the 19th century, when the parishes and their branches were under the Concordat plan, made communications difficult due to the terrain and snow in winter. All these conditions justified the creation of several parish churches which are now registered as historical monuments:

- The Church of Notre-Dame-de-Valvert (13th century)
- The Parish Church of Saint John the Baptist at la Foux (17th century) in traditional Romanesque style and whose facade is decorated with a sundial from 1757. It has an ex-voto in leather from Cordoba dated 1675;
- The Parish Church of Saint-Antoine at Bouchier (1862)

The commune also has many chapels which are also registered as historical monuments:

- The Chapel of Saint Sebastian or Chapel of White Penitents (18th century) has the rise to glory of Saint Sebastian painted on the dome. It is used for parish worship in Winter.
- The Chapel of Notre-Dame-de-la-Fleur at Villard-Haut (17th century)
- The Chapel of Sainte-Marie-Madeleine at Villard-Bas (19th century)
- The Chapel of Notre-Dame-de-Grâce at Seignus-Bas (19th century).
- The Chapel of Sainte-Brigitte and Saint-Joseph at Sainte-Brigitte (1890)
- The Chapel of Saint-Roch at Plan-Ouest (17th century)
- The Chapel of Saint Laurent at Seignus-Haut (1624)
- The Chapel of Notre-Dame-de-Lumière (formerly a parish church) at Baumelle (1857)
- The Chapel of Saint-Pierre near Basse-Colette (16th century) has a Retable closed by two small doors from the 16th century
- The Chapel of Notre-Dame-de-la-Salette at Charrières-Sud (19th century)

Other religious sites of interest

- The Chapel of Notre-Dame-des-Monts has a sundial dated 1757 and bearing the legend Dieu seul est éternel; déjà loin de toi ("God alone is eternal; already far from you")
- The Chapel of Saint-Jacques at Seignus-Bas

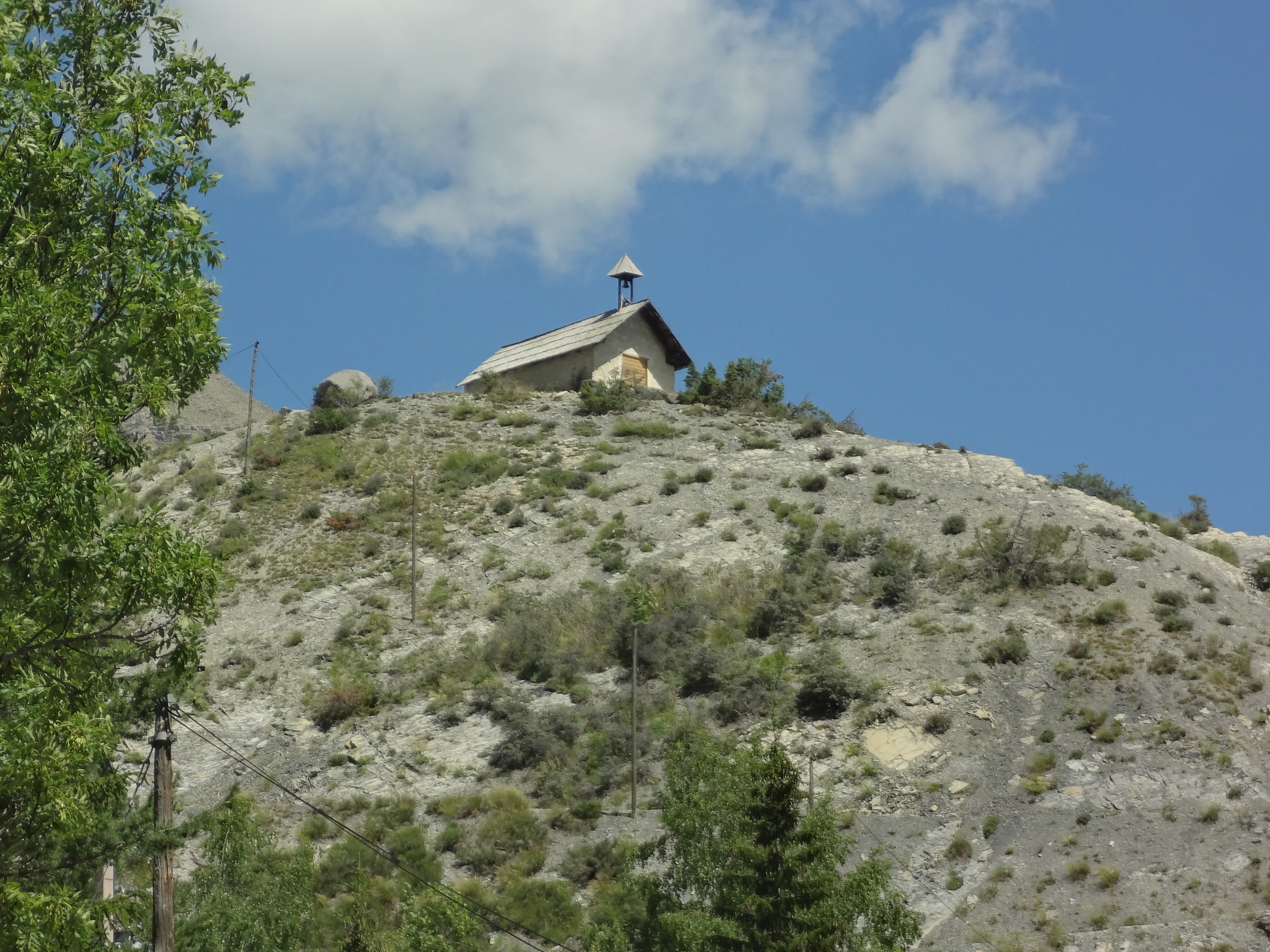
Chapel of Saint-Pierre, perched on top of a hill.

==== The Church of Notre-Dame-de-Valvert ====
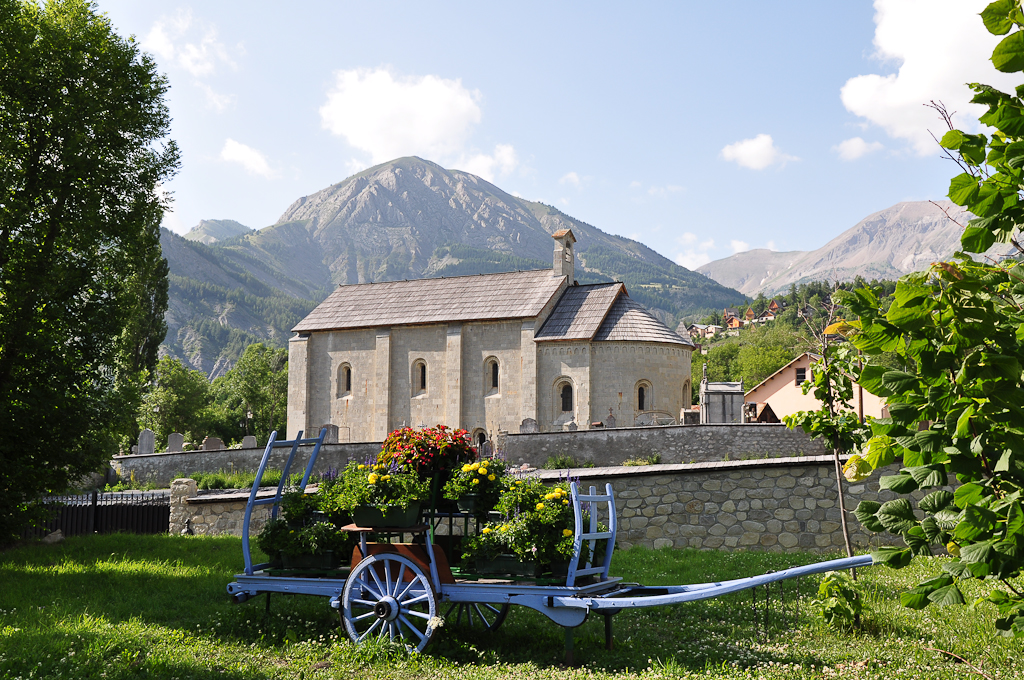
Notre-Dame-de-Valvert and blue cart

The parish church of Allos dates from the first half of the 13th century and was listed as a historical monument in 1846 for the parts dating from the second half of the 9th and 10th centuries.

It is built in Brickwork in a regular way with a chevet made of a single semicircular Apse, vaulted in cul-de-four. Like all churches in alpine style only the south wall has three bays which are semicircular.

The decor is unusual with walls decorated with a series of small arcs. The decor is a late development (13th century) of the Lombard band. The capitals are adorned with foliage, except for the facade, and decorated with masks (Lombard influence) and animals. The front is reinforced by two buttresses at the corners.

Raymond Collier identifies several characteristics of Notre-Dame-de-Valvert different from the communal type of alpine Romanesque:

- the pilasters supporting the Arc-doubleaux are replaced by engaged columns (or half-columns);

It was damaged at the beginning of the 17th century and again in 1697 by the war: the second time the Savoyards caused the collapse of the tower. The vault of the choir was repaired between that date and 1723 before the bell was worn out in 1727. The Allos fire on 15 November 1747 reached the church and caused extensive damage. A new tower was built in 1751. Major restoration work took place between 1894 and 1896: the bottom of the facade and the Mur gouttereau (guttered walls), the bay windows, and the Buttresses were completely rebuilt and the roof of the third bay itself was also completely rebuilt. The rest of the arches and the bell tower were rebuilt in 1899-1904 with various repairs, when the murals disappeared.

=== Gallery ===
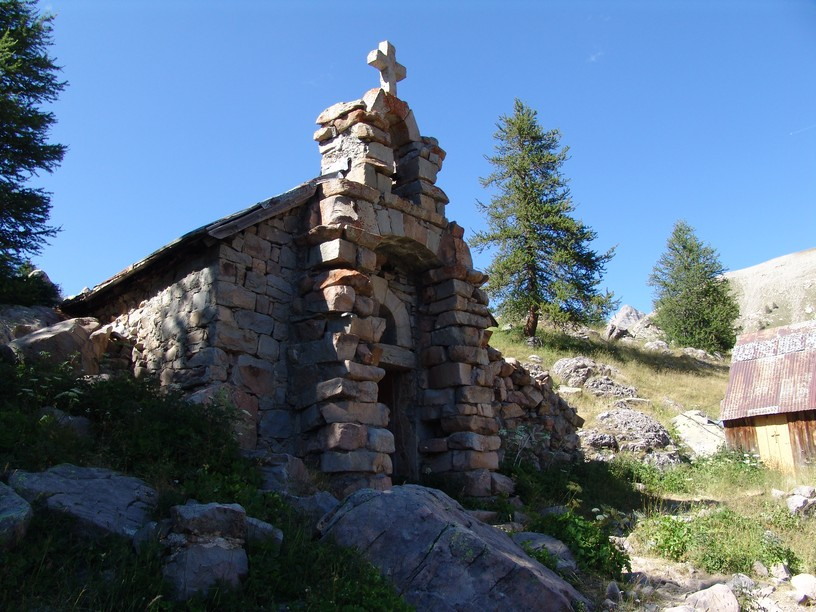
Chapel

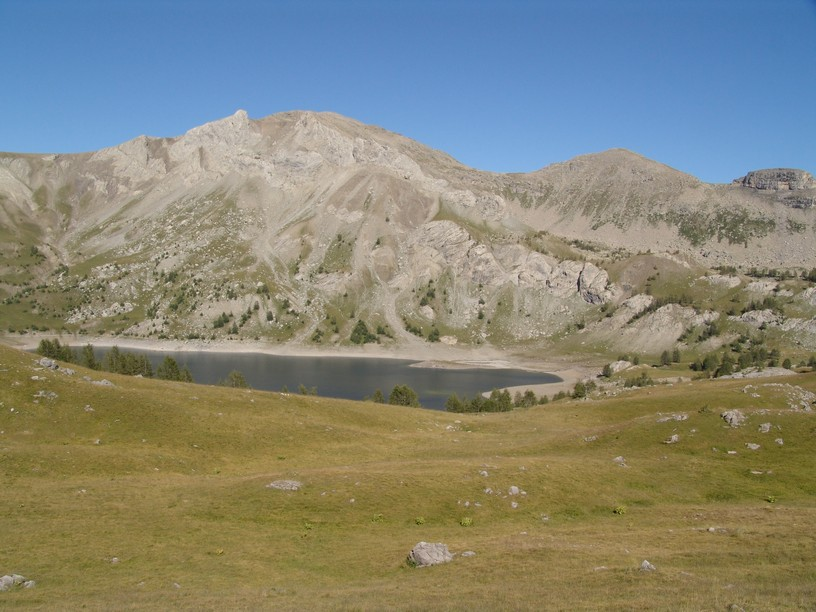
Allos lake

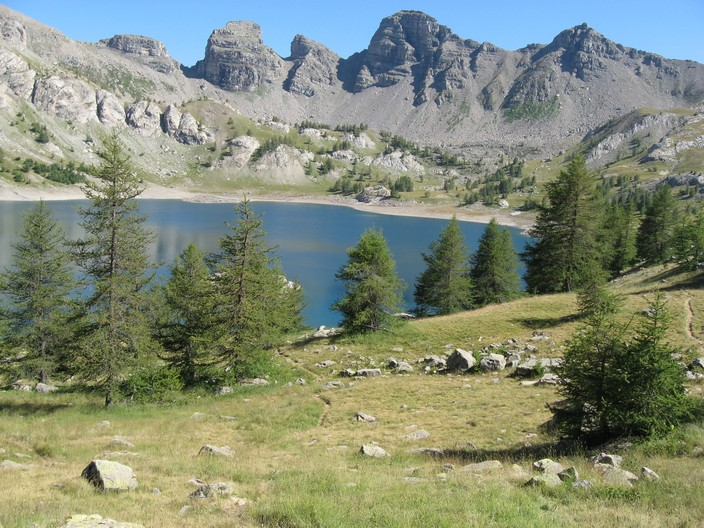
Allos lake and Mt. Pelat

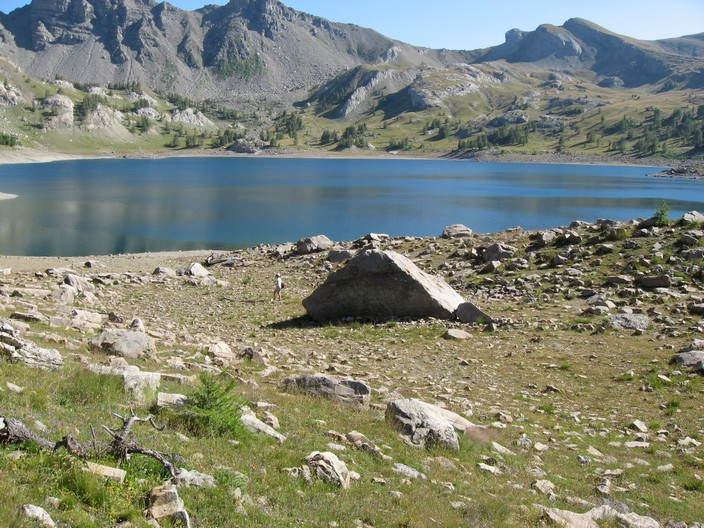
Allos lake and the chapel

== Notable people linked to the commune ==
- Patritti: a painter of the 19th century
- Jean-Esprit Pellissier, priest until 1905, he was the historian of the town.
- Simon-Jude Honnorat (1783-1852), doctor and also the town historian and author of the Great dictionary of the Occitan language

== See also ==
- Col d'Allos
- Communes of the Alpes-de-Haute-Provence department

=== Bibliography ===
- Raymond Collier, Haute-Provence monumental and artistic, Digne, Imprimerie Louis Jean, 1986, 559 p. (in French)
- Edited by Édouard Baratier, Georges Duby, and Ernest Hildesheimer, Historical Atlas. Provence, Comtat Venaissin, Principality of Orange, County of Nice, Principality of Monaco, Librairie Armand Colin, Paris, 1969 (in French)
