= Col des Champs =

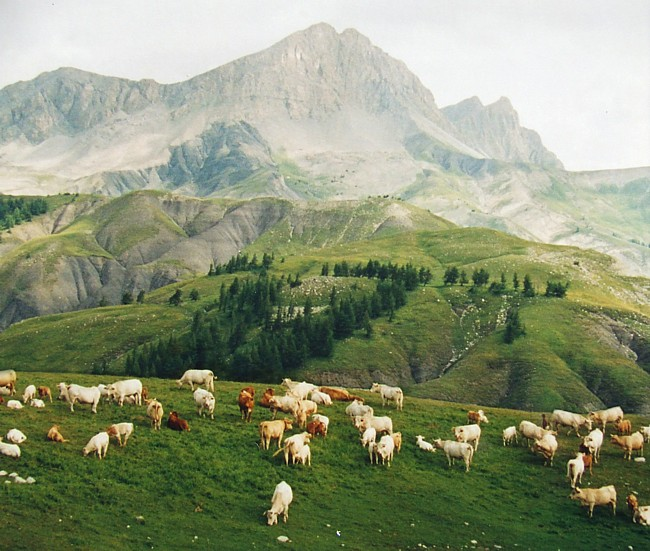
- Col des Champs, in the background the Tête de l'Encombrette

- Location within Alps
- Elevation: 2,087 metres (6,847 ft)
- Traversed by: D2

Third Approach
- Location: France
- Range: Alps
- Coordinates: 44°10′41″N 06°42′5″E

Col des Champs (elevation 2,087 m (6,847 ft)) is a high mountain pass in the Alps at the border between the departments of Alpes-de-Haute-Provence and Alpes-Maritimes in France. It connects Saint-Martin-d'Entraunes and Colmars, joining the valleys of the Var River and the Verdon River.

Together with the Col de la Cayolle and the Col d'Allos it forms part of a popular round trip for cyclists (see for example).

== Details of the climb ==
The western side, starting from Colmars, is 12.5 km long, climbing 827 m (2,713 ft) at an average of 6.6%. The state of the pavement is partly very poor (as of August 2014). While some parts are recently renovated, others contain numerous potholes and are covered by loose gravel. Along this route, mountain pass cycling milestones are placed approximately every kilometre for cyclists. These milestones indicate the current height, distance to the summit, average slope in the following passage, and also denote the street number(D2).

Starting from Saint-Martin-d'Entraunes, the climb is 16.5 km gaining 1,055 m (3,461 ft), resulting in an average gradient of 6.4%. The state of the pavement is generally good along this route, there are no designated signposts for cyclists on this side. However, at intervals of every kilometre, signs are placed indicating, as well as the distance to the summit (uphill) or the next villages (uphill and downhill).

== The exact height ==
The height of the summit is commonly specified by 2,087 m (6,847 ft), including the signpost at the summit used until 2013. However, the current signpost at the summit indicates a height of 2,080 m (6,820 ft) (see below). A topographic map of the French Institut géographique national marks 2,088 m (6,850 ft) at this position of the sign, and 2,089 m (6,854 ft) some 50 metres away from the signpost.

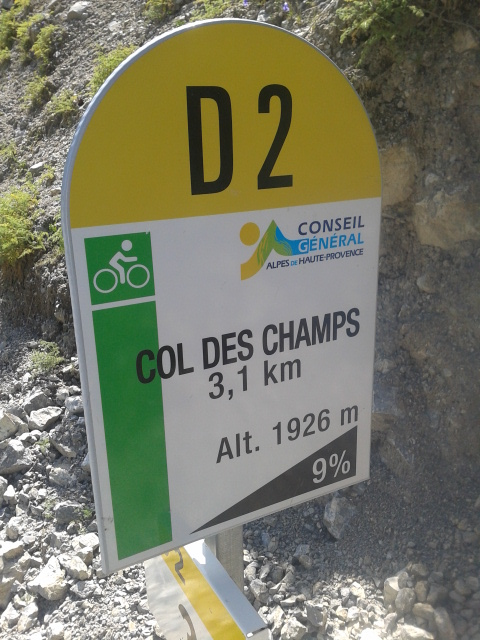
One of the mountain pass cycling milestones along the climb from Colmars

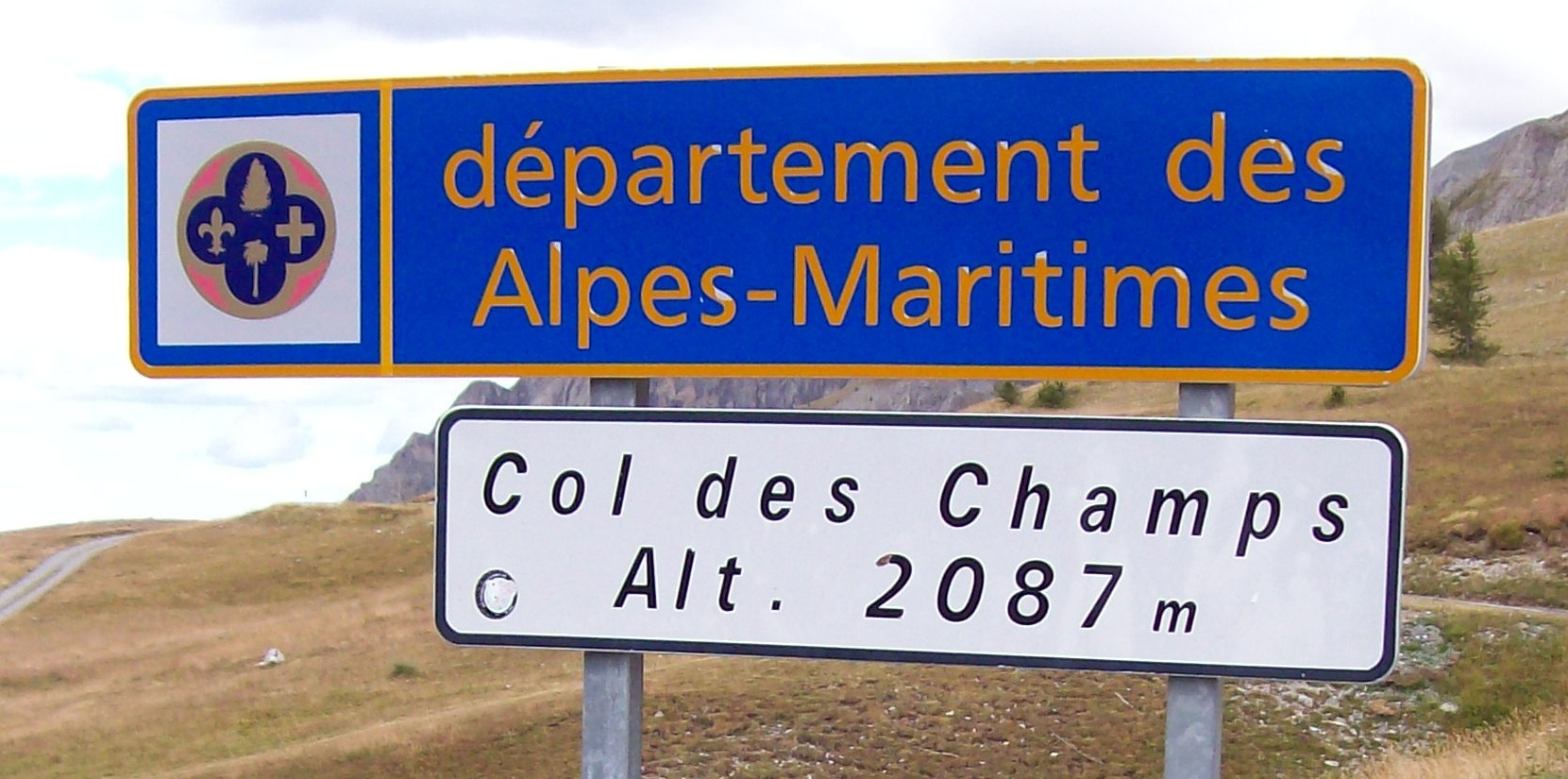
Signpost at the summit of the Col des Champs as of 2013

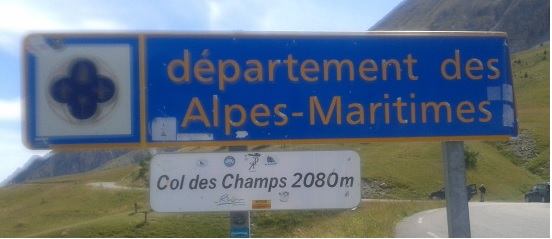
Signpost at the summit of the Col des Champs as of 2014
