= Col d'Allos =

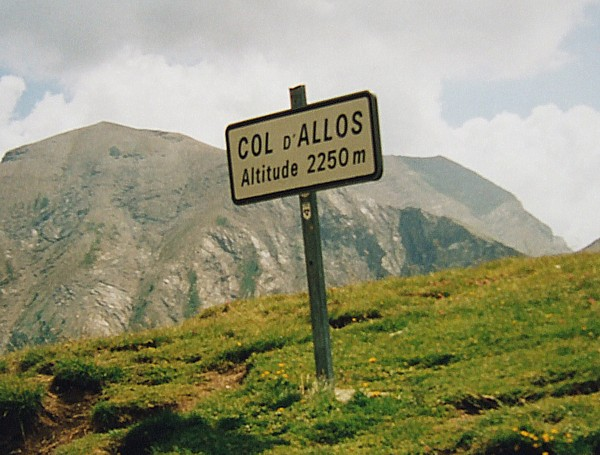
- Sign at the summit

- Location within Alps
- Elevation: 2,250 m (7,380 ft)

Location
- Location: France
- Range: Alps
- Coordinates: 44°17′50″N 06°35′39″E

Col d'Allos (elevation 2,250 m (7,380 ft)) is a high mountain pass in the Alps in the department of Alpes-de-Haute-Provence in France. It connects Barcelonnette in the Ubaye Valley and Colmars.

It lies parallel to the Col de la Cayolle and Col de la Bonette west of the Parc National du Mercantour. The source of the Verdon River is near the pass.

Between 1911 and 1939, the Col d'Allos barely missed a year in the Tour de France (one of the most popular cols). François Faber was the first rider to cross the pass in 1911 and since then, it has been part of the route 33 times. It was last part of the 2000 Tour, (13th stage) when Pascal Hervé was the first to summit, in 2015 the mountain was again visited by Tour de France at Stage 17 this was won by Simon Geschke.

== Details of the climb ==
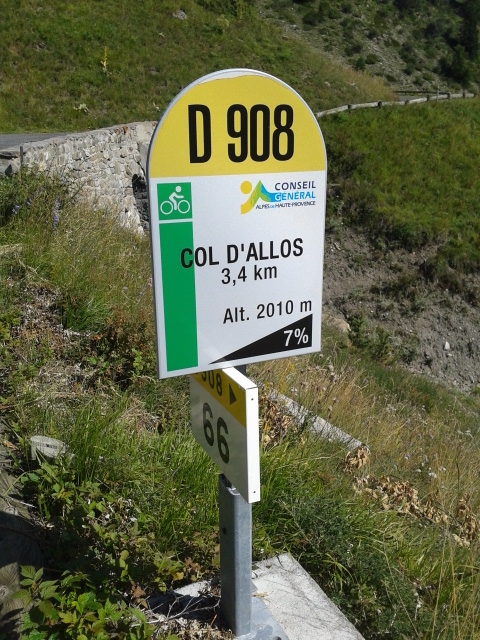
One of the mountain pass cycling milestones along the climb from Barcelonette

The northern side from Barcelonette is 17.5 km long, climbing 1,108 m (3,635 ft) at an average of 6.3%.

Starting from Colmars, the climb is 23.6 km gaining 1,005 m (3,297 ft), resulting in an average of 4.3%.

On both sides mountain pass cycling milestones are placed approximately every kilometre. They indicate the current height, the distance to the summit, the average slope in the following passage, as well as the number of the street (D908).

== Bicycle tourism ==
Together with the Col des Champs and the Col de la Cayolle it forms part of a popular round trip for cyclists (see for example).

In July and August the Col d'Allos is reserved for bicycles on Friday mornings (8am-11am).

== See also ==
- List of highest paved roads in Europe
- List of mountain passes
- Lac d'Allos
- Allos
- Souvenir Henri Desgrange
