= Mont Pelat =

Mountain in France

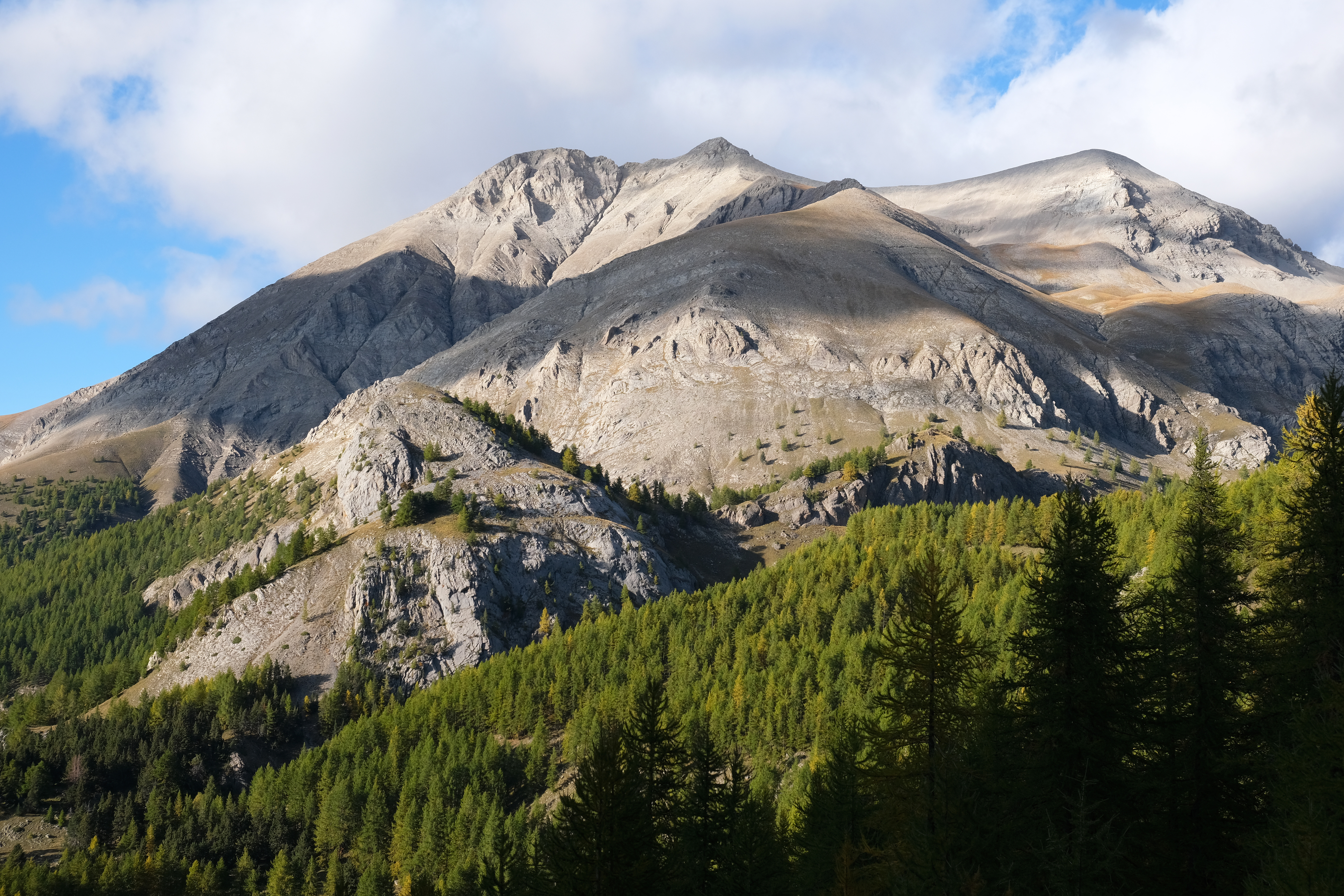
- Mont Pelat

Highest point
- Elevation: 3,052 m (10,013 ft)
- Prominence: 770 m (2,530 ft)
- Listing: Alpine mountains above 3000 m
- Coordinates: 44°15′54″N 6°42′21″E

Geography
- Location within Alps
- Location: Provence-Alpes-Côte-d'Azur, France
- Parent range: Maritime Alps

Mont Pelat (3,050m) is a mountain of the Maritime Alps located in the chain of mountains between the high valley of Verdon to the west, the high valley of Var to the east and the Bachelard valley in the north. Located in the department of Alpes-de-Haute-Provence, it is the namesake of the Pelat Massif. The summit is located in the central area of the Mercantour National Park. It is known as being one of the easiest of the 3,000m Alpine peaks to climb. It overlooks the magnificent glacial Allos Lake, the largest mountain lake in Europe, which is 2,227 m (7,306 ft) above sea level.

The normal access route is through the valley of Pelat, located southeast of the summit and accessible both from Lake Allos and from the Col de la Cayolle. The path presents no particular difficulty. On the summit, the view stretches from the Montagne Sainte-Victoire in the south to Mont Blanc in the north.

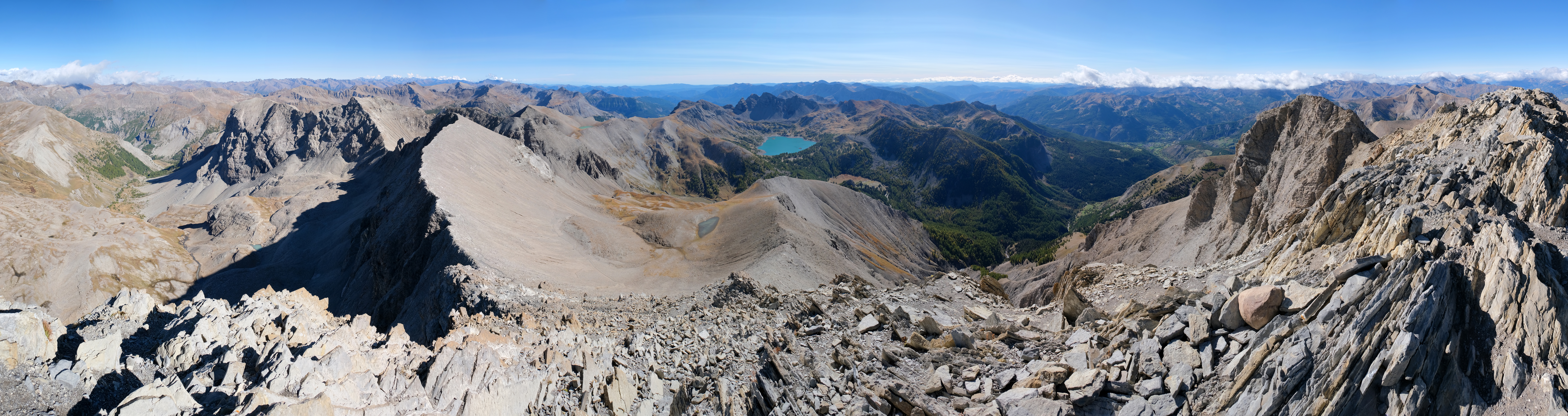
Panoramic view from the top of Mont Pelat
