= Lac d'Allos =

Lac d'Allos Lake of Allos
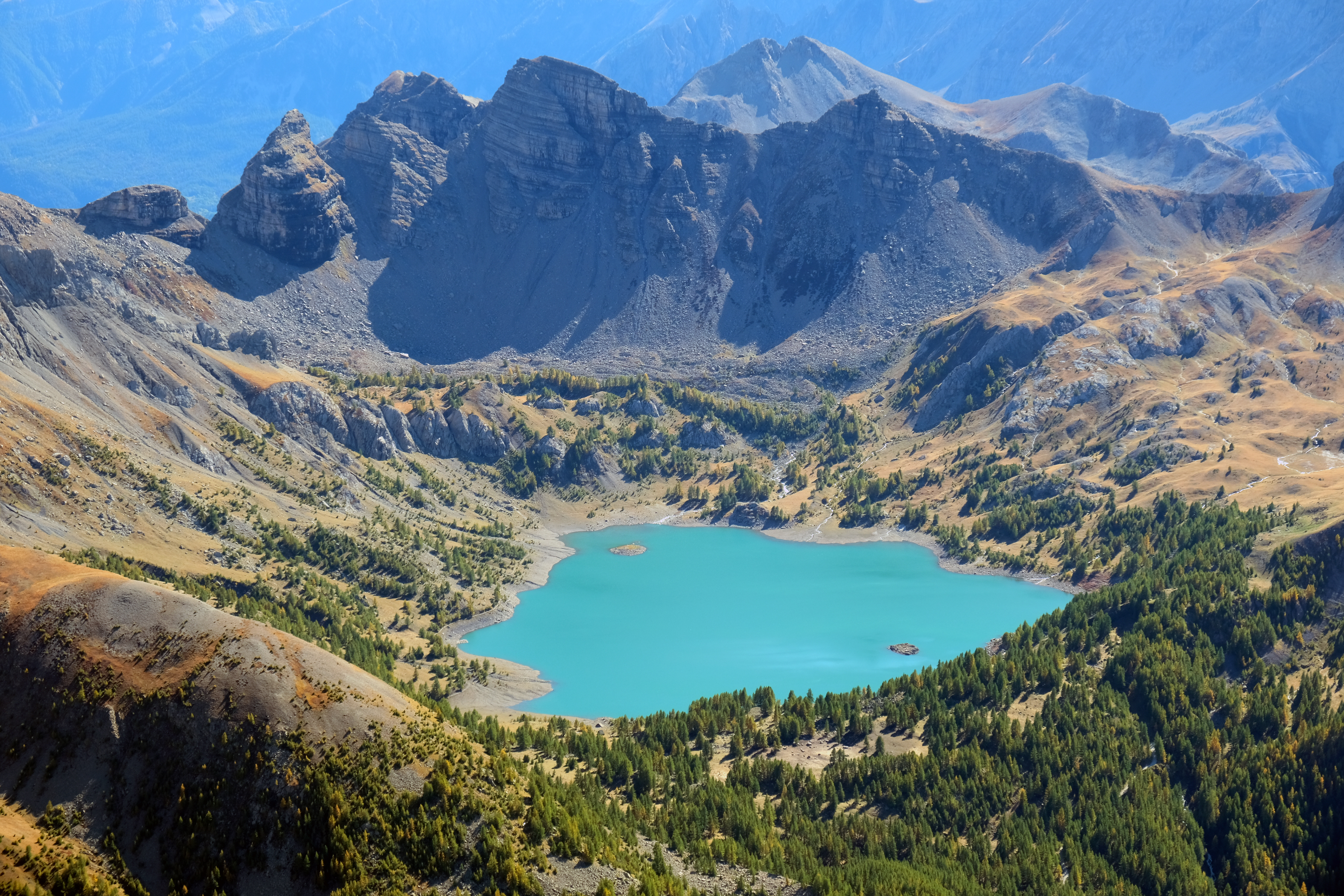

- Location within Provence-Alpes-Côte d'Azur
- Location: Parc National du Mercantour, France
- Coordinates: 44°14′00″N 6°42′30″E
- Type: Natural lake
- Catchment area: 60 ha (150 acres)
- Basin countries: France
- Surface area: 60 ha (150 acres)
- Max. depth: 50 m (160 ft)
- Surface elevation: 2,230 m (7,320 ft)
- References: More info

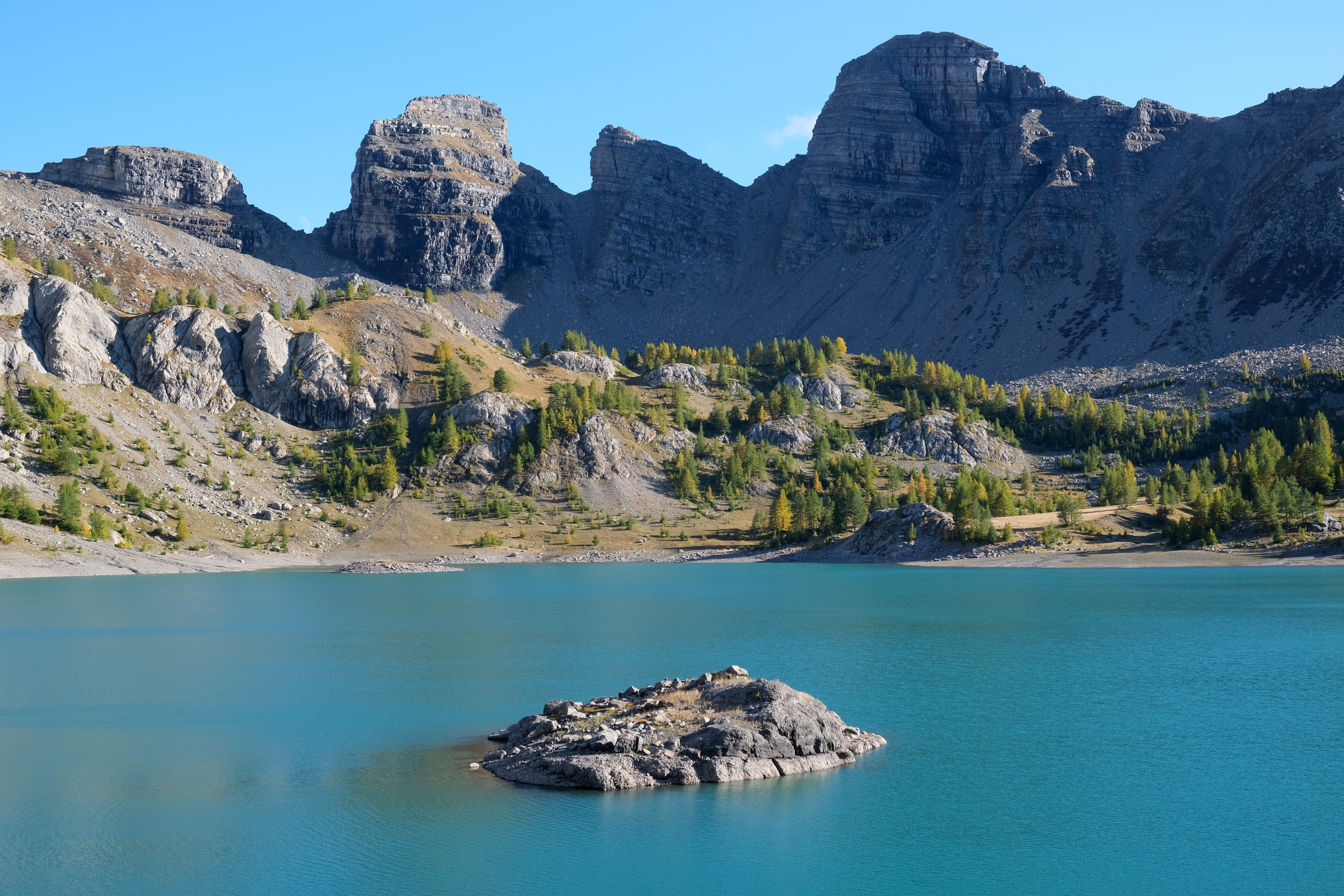
Lac d'Allos

Lac d'Allos is an alpine lake at a height of 2,230 m. It is located in Parc National du Mercantour, departement Alpes-de-Haute-Provence the region Provence-Alpes-Côte d'Azur, France.

== Description ==
Lac d'Allos is a lake in the Alpes-de-Haute-Provence and is dominated by Mont Pelat (3052 meters), it is the largest natural high altitude lake in Europe. It covers 60 hectares and has a depth of 50 m. In the twelfth century, it was called Levedone.

The lake is situated nearby the municipality of Allos.

== See also ==
- Col d'Allos
- List of lakes in France
