= Artuby =

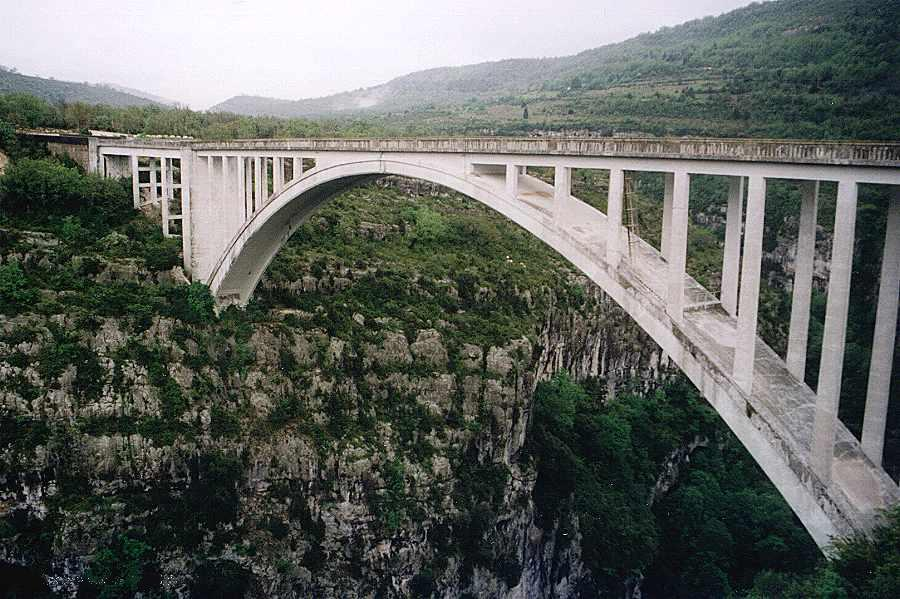

- Location within France Location within Provence-Alpes-Côte d'Azur

Location
- Country: France
- Region: Provence-Alpes-Côte d'Azur
- Departments: Alpes-de-Haute-Provence; Alpes-Maritimes; Var

Physical characteristics
- Source
  - location: Peyroules
  - coordinates: 43.814°N 6.7073°E
- Mouth
  - location: Verdon
  - coordinates: 43.7397°N 6.3787°E
- Length: 54 km (34 mi)
- Basin size: 373 km^{2} (144 sq mi)

Basin features
- Progression: Verdon→ Durance→ Rhône→ Mediterranean Sea

Artuby (French pronunciation: [aʁtybi]; Artubi in Provençal) is a river in France, crossing the Alpes-de-Haute-Provence, Alpes-Maritimes and Var departments, and a sub-tributary of Rhône by the Verdon and Durance. It is 53.8 km (33.4 mi) long. Its drainage basin is 373 km^{2} (144 sq mi).
