= Col de la Cayolle =

Mountain pass in the French Alps

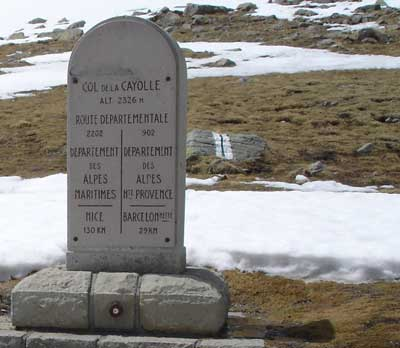
- Sign at the summit, showing the border between the two departments

- Location within Alps
- Elevation: 2,326 metres (7,631 ft)

Third Approach
- Location: France
- Range: Alps
- Coordinates: 44°15′32″N 6°44′38″E

Col de la Cayolle (el. 2,326 m) is a high mountain pass in the French Alps at the border between the departments of Alpes-Maritimes and Alpes-de-Haute-Provence in France. The highway connects Barcelonnette in the Ubaye Valley and Saint-Martin-d'Entraunes.

The mountain lies parallel to the Col d'Allos and Col de la Bonette in the Parc National du Mercantour. The Var River has its source near the pass, and the road leads to the red-rock Gorges de Daluis.

== Bicycle tourism ==
Together with the Col des Champs and the Col d'Allos it forms part of a popular round trip for cyclists.

== See also ==
- List of highest paved roads in Europe
- List of mountain passes
