= Barcelonnette–Saint-Pons Airfield =

Barcelonnette–Saint-Pons Airport Aéroport de Barcelonnette–Saint-Pons
- IATA: BAE; ICAO: LFMR

Summary
- Airport type: Public
- Serves: Barcelonnette, France
- Location: Saint-Pons
- Elevation AMSL: 3,714 ft (1,132 m)
- Coordinates: 44°23′14″N 006°36′33″E

Map
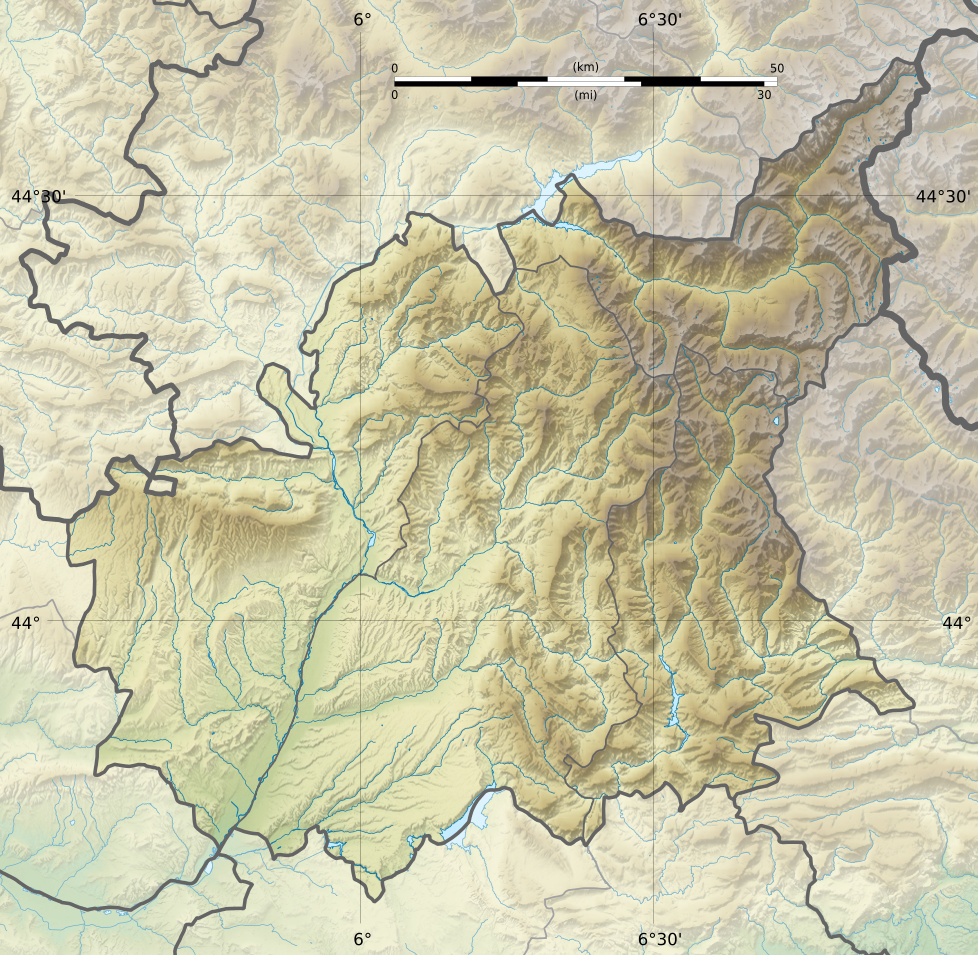
- Location in Alpes-de-Haute-Provence department Location of department in France

Runways
| Direction | Length | | Surface |
| Direction | m | ft | Surface |
|---|---|---|---|
| 09/27 | 800 | 2,625 | Paved |
- Source: French AIP

Barcelonnette–Saint-Pons Airport (IATA: BAE, ICAO: LFMR) is an airport located at Saint-Pons, 3 km (2 miles) west of Barcelonnette, both communes in the Alpes-de-Haute-Provence department of the Provence-Alpes-Côte d'Azur region in France.

The airport is situated along the north side of the Ubaye river. It has an 800 m (2,600 ft) unlit runway. It is open to national commercial traffic and private aircraft operating daylight visual flight rules.

Civil and military aircraft may refuel with avgas 100LL and TRO. There are no customs, nor police, but an SSLIA (French: Service de sauvetage et de lutte contre l'incendie des aéronefs sur les aérodromes, "Airport and Aircraft Fire and Rescue Service") is provided at Level 1.

== Air traffic control ==
There is no air traffic control tower; traffic is controlled by automated information provision on 123.500 MHz.

Barcelonnette is a small airport dependent on the Provence aeronautical district; it uses no services of the Directorate General for Civil Aviation. For aeronautical information, and preparation and deposition of flight plans, it is annexed to the Bureau Régional d'Information aéronautique (BRIA, "Regional Aeronautical Information Office") of Marseille Provence Airport.

To follow the visual flight plans and for air traffic control the airport is dependent on telecommunications and flight information from the French: Centre en route de la navigation aérienne Sud-Est ("South-East Air Traffic Control Centre") at Aix-en-Provence.

== Clubs ==
The airport is home to the Barcelonnette Glider Club (l'Ubaye Glider Club).
