= Verdon (river) =

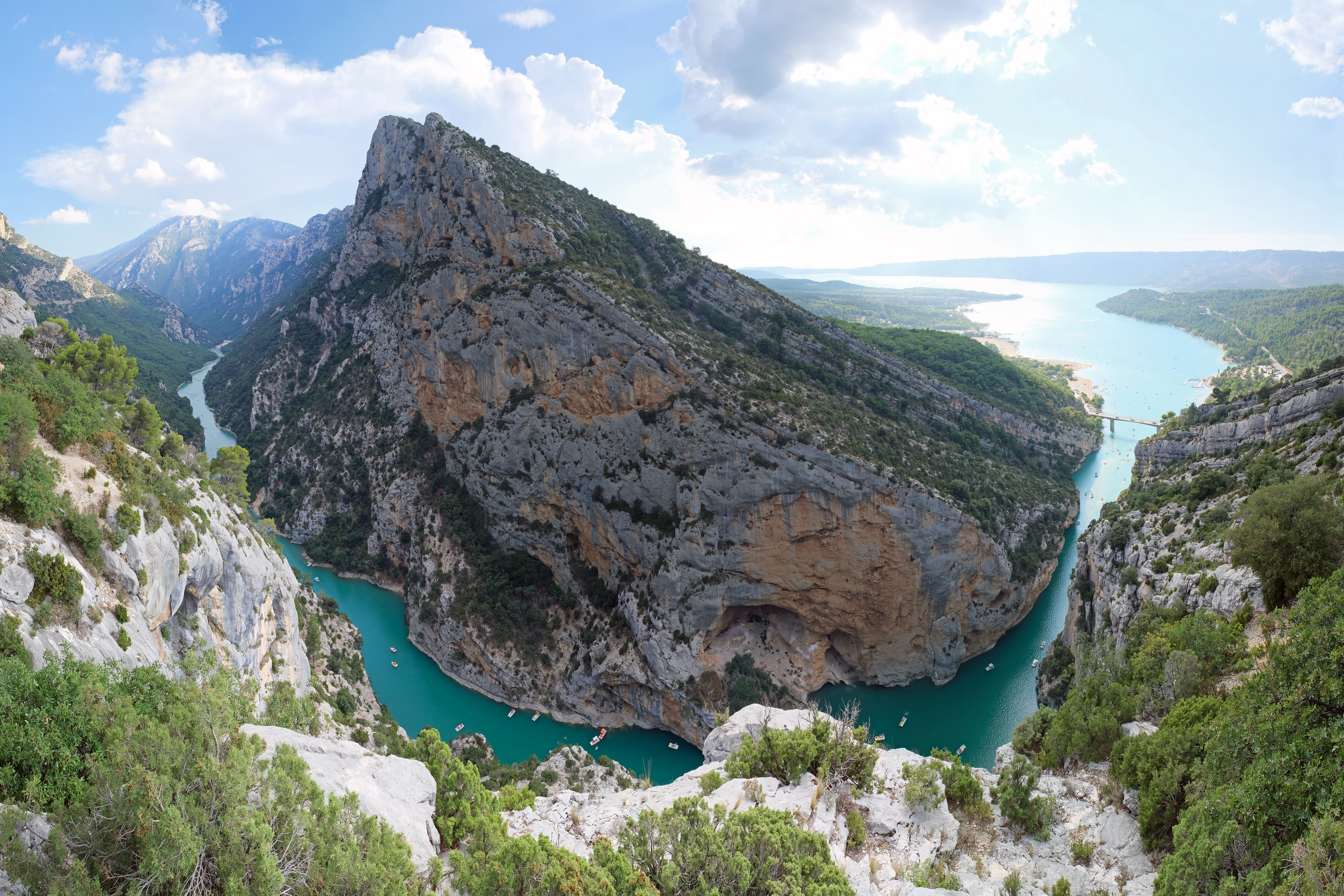
- Verdon Gorge and Lake of Sainte-Croix. At the end of the canyon, the Verdon flows into the artificial Lake of Sainte-Croix.

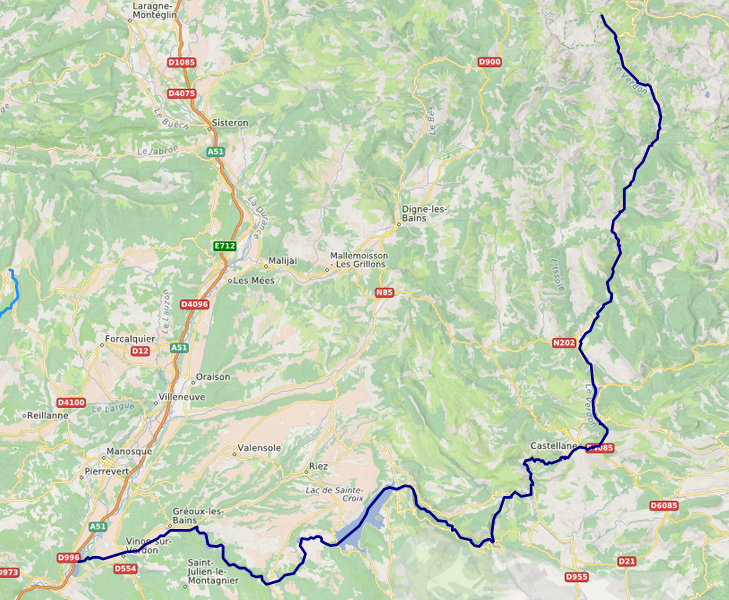

Location
- Country: France

Physical characteristics
- Source
  - location: Alpes-de-Haute-Provence
  - elevation: 2,819 m (9,249 ft)
- Mouth
  - location: Durance
  - coordinates: 43°43′6″N 5°44′54″E
- Length: 166.5 km (103.5 mi)
- Basin size: 2,295 km^{2} (886 sq mi)

Basin features
- Progression: Durance→ Rhône→ Mediterranean Sea
- Tributaries
  - left: Artuby

The Verdon (French pronunciation: [vɛʁdɔ̃], Occitan: [ˈbeɾðu]) is a 166.5-kilometre-long (103.5 mi) river in Southeastern France, left tributary of the Durance. Its drainage basin is 2,295 km^{2} (886 sq mi). The Verdon is best known for its impressive canyon: the Verdon Gorge. This limestone canyon, also called the "Grand Canyon of Verdon", 20 kilometres (12 mi) long and more than 300 metres (980 ft) deep, is a popular climbing and sight-seeing area. The name comes from the green appearance of the waters of the river, in the canyon.

== Course ==
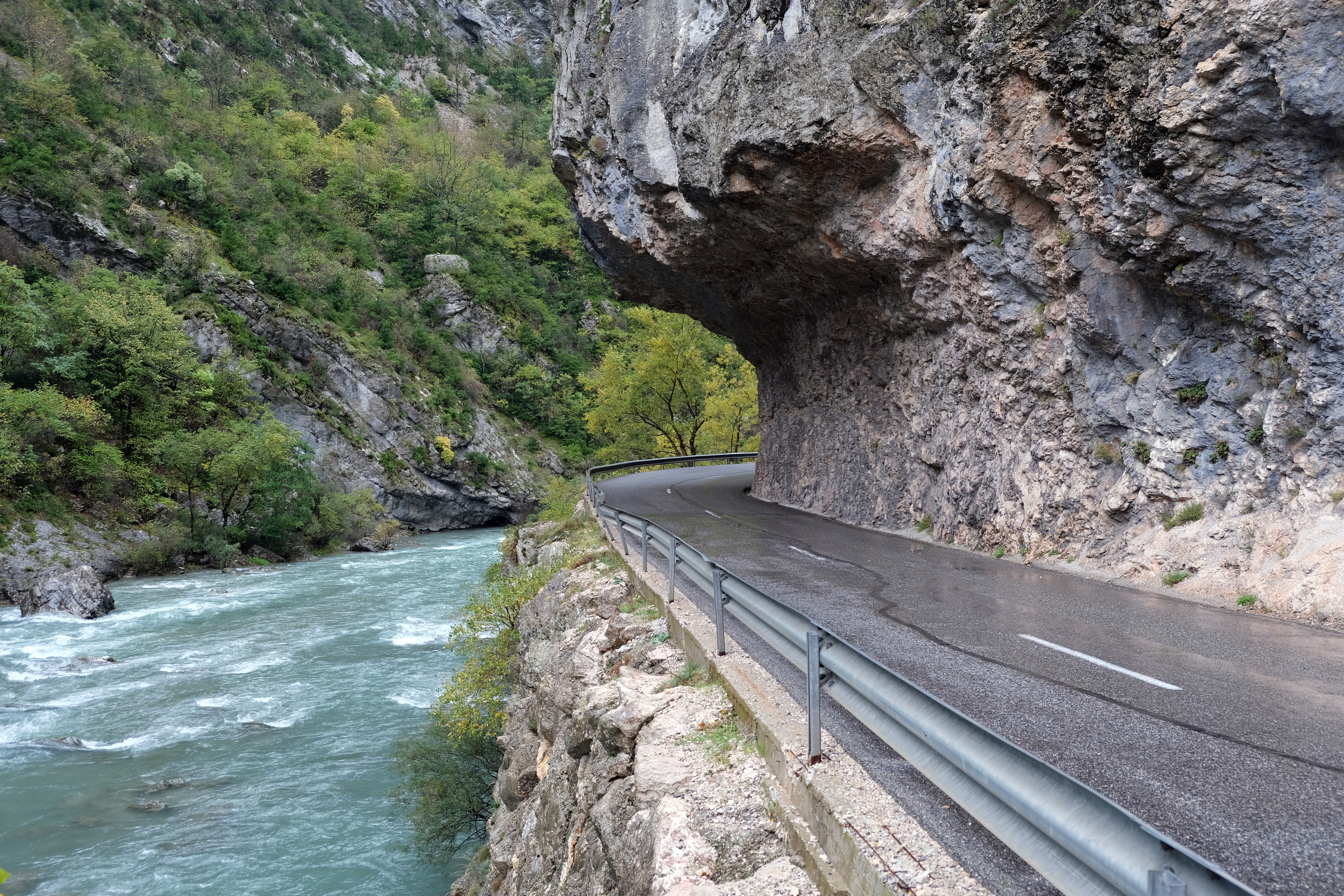
The D952 road follows the river.

Its source is at an elevation of 2,819 metres (9,249 ft), in the southwestern part of the French Alps (Alpes-de-Haute-Provence), between the Col d'Allos and the Trois Évêchés mountain, south of Barcelonnette. It flows southwest through the following departments and towns:

- Alpes-de-Haute-Provence: Allos, Colmars, Saint-André-les-Alpes, Castellane
- Var: Vinon-sur-Verdon

The Verdon flows through several artificial lakes, before flowing into the river Durance near Vinon-sur-Verdon, south of Manosque.

Its main tributaries are the Artuby, Colostre, Jabron and Issole.

== See also ==
- Lake of Sainte-Croix
