= Villa Costebelle =

Coordinates: 44.3891°N 6.6547°E

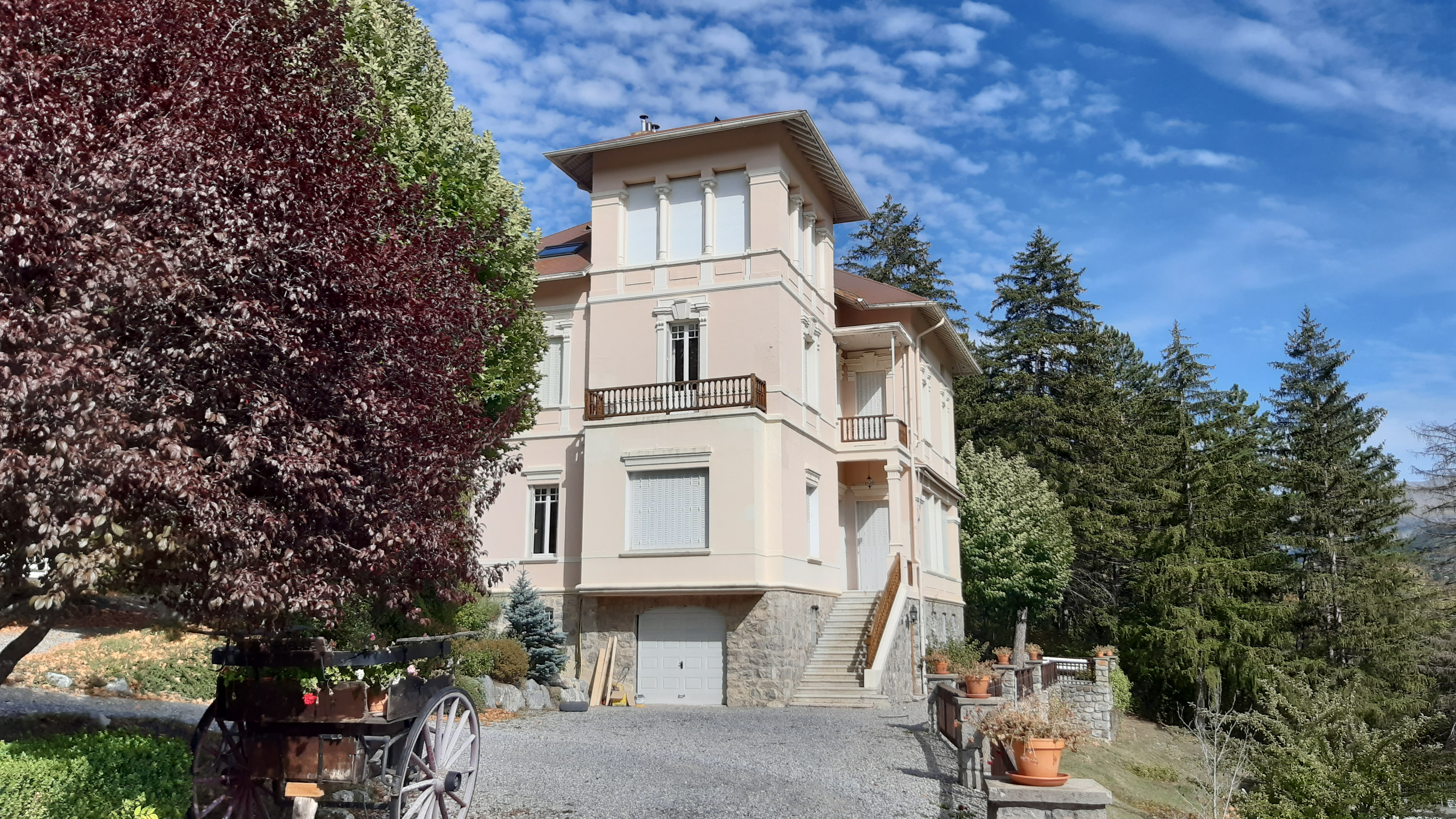
- The Villa Costebelle in 2020.
- Interactive map of the Villa Costebelle area

General information
- Type: Villa
- Location: Rue François-Arnaud, Barcelonnette, France
- Construction started: 1913
- Completed: 1914
- Client: Camille Jean

The Villa Costebelle is a historic mansion in Barcelonnette, Alpes-de-Haute-Provence, Provence-Alpes-Côte d'Azur, France. It was built from 1913 to 1914 for Victor Garcin, a French businessman in Mexico. It has been listed as an official historical monument since 1986.
