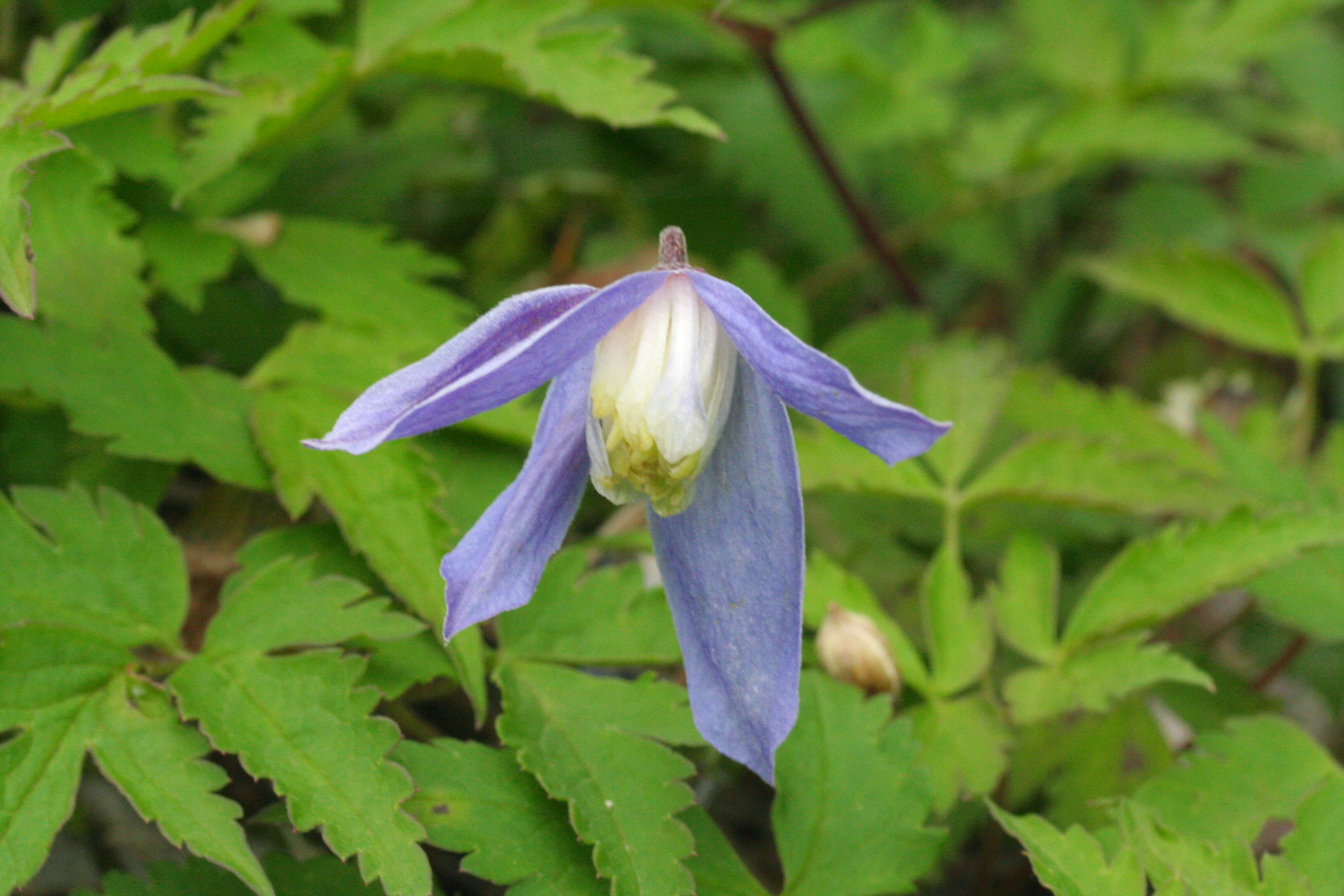

Scientific classification
- Kingdom: Plantae
- Clade: Tracheophytes
- Clade: Angiosperms
- Clade: Eudicots
- Order: Ranunculales
- Family: Ranunculaceae
- Genus: Clematis
- Species: C. alpina

Binomial name
- Clematis alpina (L.) Mill.

= Clematis alpina =

Species of flowering plant in the buttercup family

Clematis alpina, the Alpine clematis, is a flowering deciduous vine of the genus Clematis. Like many members of that genus, it is prized by gardeners for its showy flowers. It bears 1 to 3-inch spring flowers on long stalks in a wide variety of colors. C. alpina is native to Europe; in the United States it grows best in American Horticultural Society zones 9 to 6, which are generally found in the southern USA.

Cultivars include the pale pink 'Willy', dark blue 'Helsingborg' and lavender blue 'Pamela Jackman'.

Clematis alpina 'Pamela Jackman' has gained the Royal Horticultural Society's Award of Garden Merit.
