= Saint-Martin-d'Entraunes =

Commune in Provence-Alpes-Côte d'Azur, France

Saint-Martin-d'Entraunes Sant Martin d'Entraunas (Occitan)
- Commune
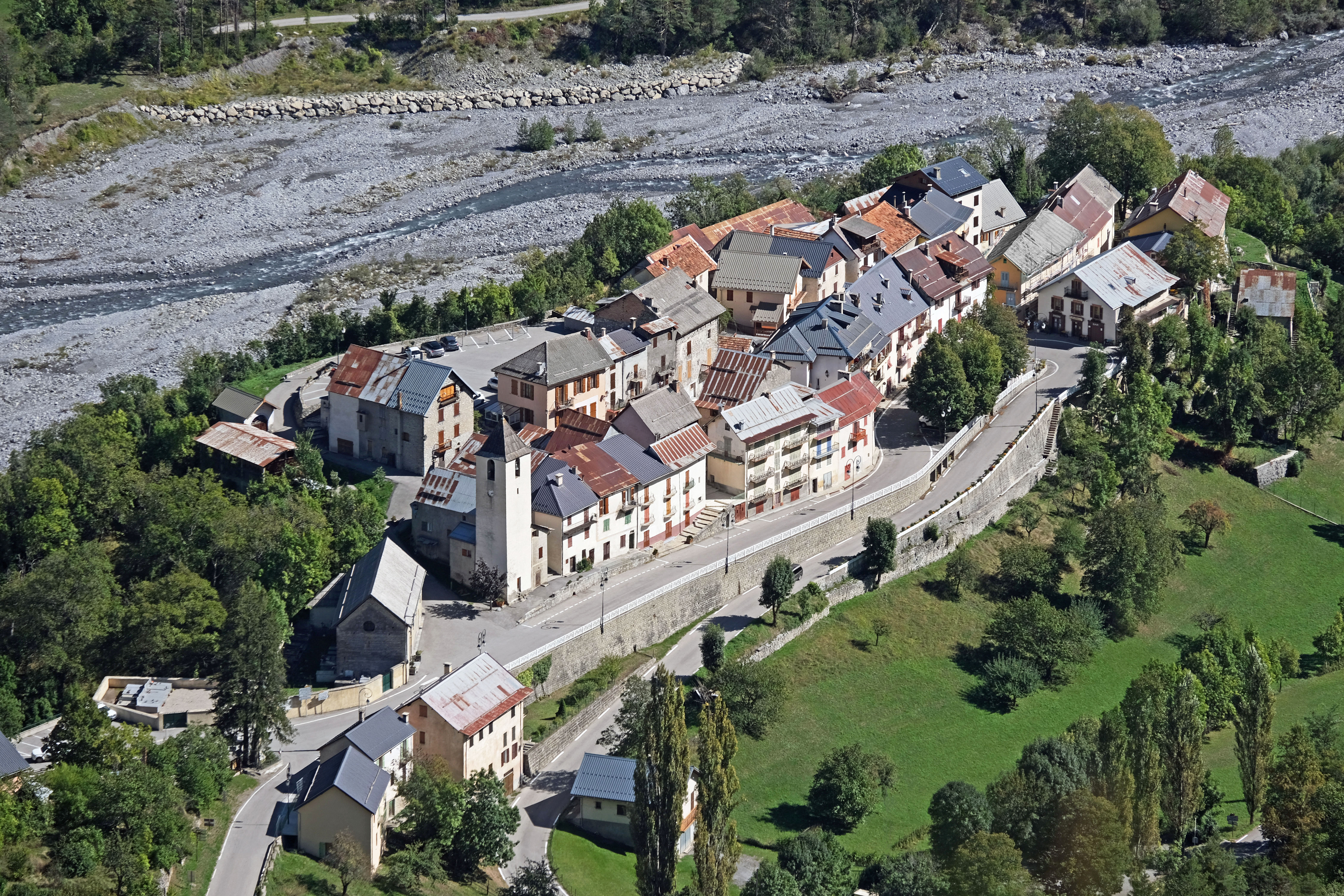
- A view of the village from the road to the Col des Champs with the Var river in the background

- Coat of arms
- Location of Saint-Martin-d'Entraunes
- Location within France Location within Provence-Alpes-Côte d'Azur
- Coordinates: 44°08′34″N 6°45′46″E
- Country: France
- Region: Provence-Alpes-Côte d'Azur
- Department: Alpes-Maritimes
- Arrondissement: Nice
- Canton: Vence
- Intercommunality: CC Alpes d'Azur

Government
  - Mayor (2026–32): Jean-Claude Autheman
- Area^{1}: 40.05 km^{2} (15.46 sq mi)
- Elevation: 1,050 m (3,440 ft)
- Highest elevation: 2,742 m (8,996 ft)
- Lowest elevation: 968 m (3,176 ft)
- Population (2023): 138
  - Density: 3.45/km^{2} (8.92/sq mi)
- Demonym: Saint-Martinois
- Time zone: UTC+01:00 (CET)
  - Summer (DST): UTC+02:00 (CEST)
- INSEE/Postal code: 06125 /06470
- ^{1} French Land Register data, which excludes lakes, ponds, glaciers > 1 km^{2} (0.386 sq mi or 247 acres) and river estuaries.

Saint-Martin-d'Entraunes (French pronunciation: [sɛ̃ maʁtɛ̃ dɑ̃tʁon]; lit. 'St Martin of Entraunes'; Occitan: Sant Martin d'Entraunas; Italian: San Martino d'Entraunes, formerly) is a rural commune in the Alpes-Maritimes department in Southeastern France. It is located in the middle stretches of the Var valley on the border with Alpes-de-Haute-Provence, at the limit of Mercantour National Park.

== Population ==
Historical population
Year	Pop.	±% p.a.
1968	172	—
1975	115	−5.59%
1982	113	−0.25%
1990	113	+0.00%
1999	88	−2.74%
2007	84	−0.58%
2012	102	+3.96%
2017	142	+6.84%
2023	138	−0.48%
Source: INSEE

== See also ==
- Communes of the Alpes-Maritimes department
- Col de la Cayolle
