= Colmars =

- Commune
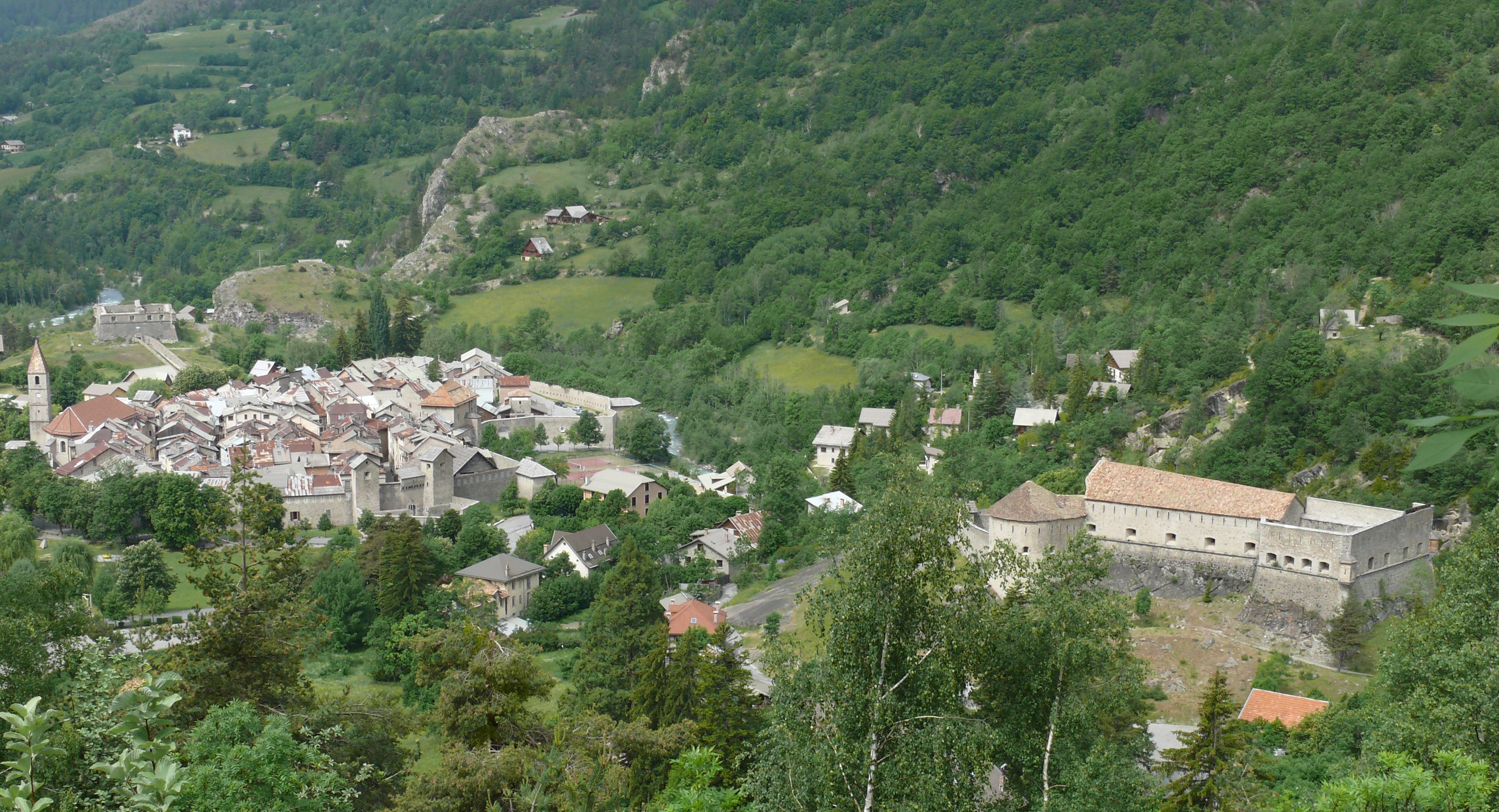
- An overall view of the village of Colmars

- Coat of arms
- Location of Colmars
- Location within France Location within Provence-Alpes-Côte d'Azur
- Coordinates: 44°10′55″N 6°37′38″E
- Country: France
- Region: Provence-Alpes-Côte d'Azur
- Department: Alpes-de-Haute-Provence
- Arrondissement: Castellane
- Canton: Castellane

Government
  - Mayor (2026–32): Magali Surle-Girieud
- Area^{1}: 81.82 km^{2} (31.59 sq mi)
- Elevation: 1,250 m (4,100 ft)
- Highest elevation: 2,742 m (8,996 ft)
- Lowest elevation: 1,178 m (3,865 ft)
- Population (2023): 583
  - Density: 7.13/km^{2} (18.5/sq mi)
- Time zone: UTC+01:00 (CET)
  - Summer (DST): UTC+02:00 (CEST)
- INSEE/Postal code: 04061 /04370
- ^{1} French Land Register data, which excludes lakes, ponds, glaciers > 1 km^{2} (0.386 sq mi or 247 acres) and river estuaries.

Colmars (French pronunciation: [kɔlmaʁ]; Occitan: Cormarç) or Colmars-les-Alpes (French pronunciation: [kɔlmaʁ lez‿alp]) is a commune in the Alpes-de-Haute-Provence department in southeastern France.

The official name of the commune, according to the geographical code of the INSEE, is "Colmars", but it is always referred locally as "Colmars-les-Alpes", even though it is not recognised in legal situations. The signs on entering the village read "Colmars-les-Alpes".

== Geography ==
The village is situated at the confluence of the rivers Verdon and Lance, at an altitude of 1250 metres. The site of the village is a site inscrit, a site of special natural, scientific or historical interest.

=== Hamlets ===
There are two other hamlets in the commune: Clignon-Haut and Clignon-Bas.

== Population ==
Historical population
Year	Pop.	±% p.a.
1968	360	—
1975	311	−2.07%
1982	314	+0.14%
1990	367	+1.97%
1999	378	+0.33%
2007	385	+0.23%
2012	395	+0.51%
2017	496	+4.66%
2023	583	+2.73%
Source: INSEE

The inhabitants are called Colmarsiens in French.

== Geography ==
=== Mountains and peaks ===
There are numerous high points in the commune. The main ones are:

- Tête de l'Encombrette (2682m)
- Autapie (2426m)
- Roche Cline
- Valpane

== History ==
The name of the village comes from a hill dedicated to Mars by the Romans ("Collo Marto"). The village was originally situated further up a hill, but the site was judged to be too cramped and not possible to expand any further, so it was abandoned. It was destroyed by Raymond de Turenne in 1390.

=== Modern era ===
In the French Wars of Religion, the site was the target of several attacks:

- Paulon de Mauvans, a Protestant captain, pillaged the village in 1560;
- Cartier, a captain operating on behalf of de Mauvans, took and ransomed the village in 1583;
- The French Catholic League sacked the village a few years later.

== Gallery ==
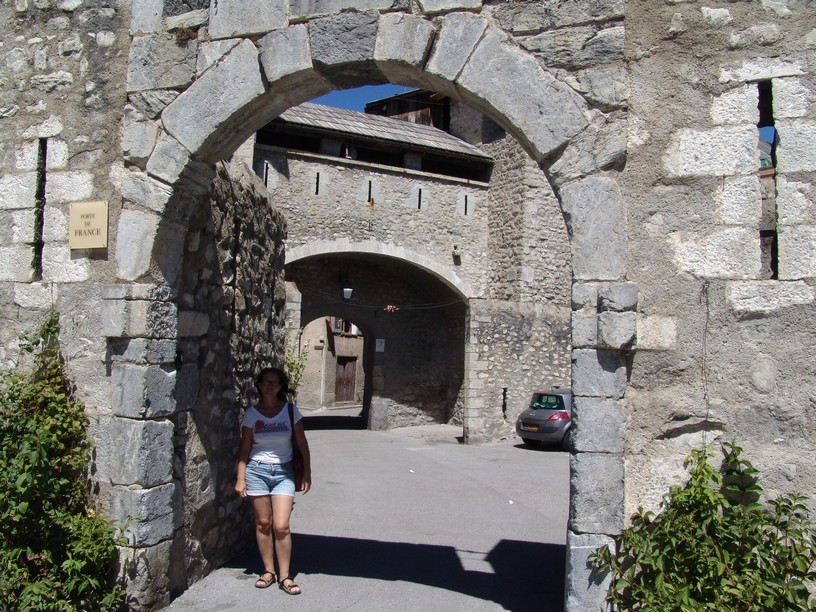

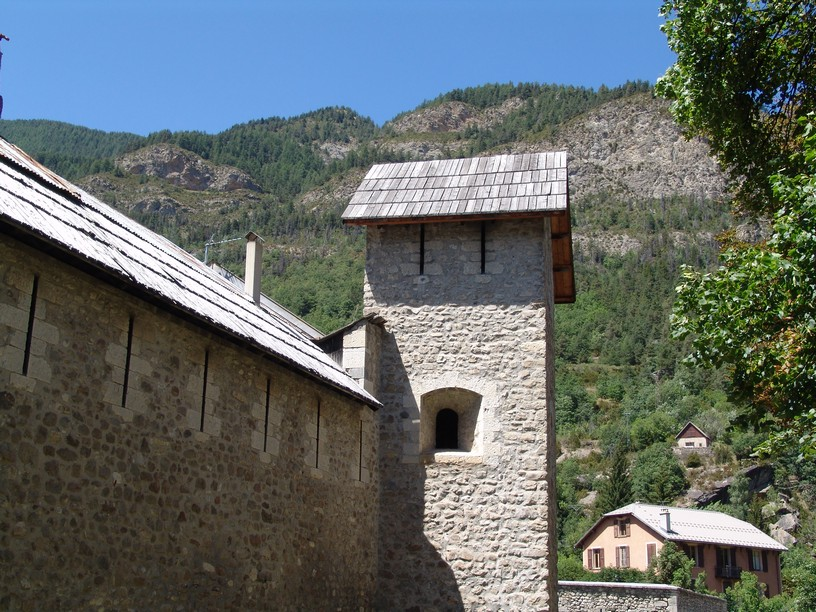

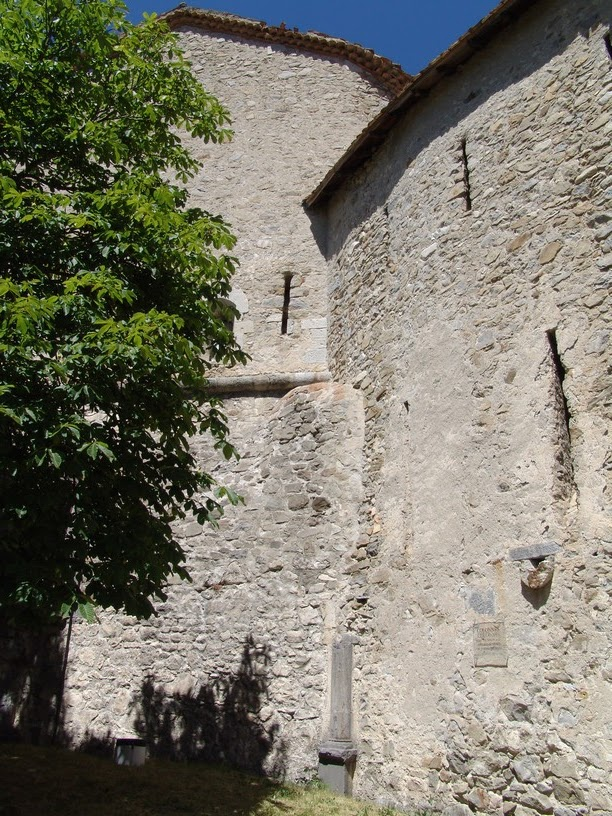

== See also ==
- Verdon River
- Col d'Allos
- Communes of the Alpes-de-Haute-Provence department
