= Barcelonnette =

Barcelonnette Barciloneta de Provença (Occitan)
- Subprefecture and commune
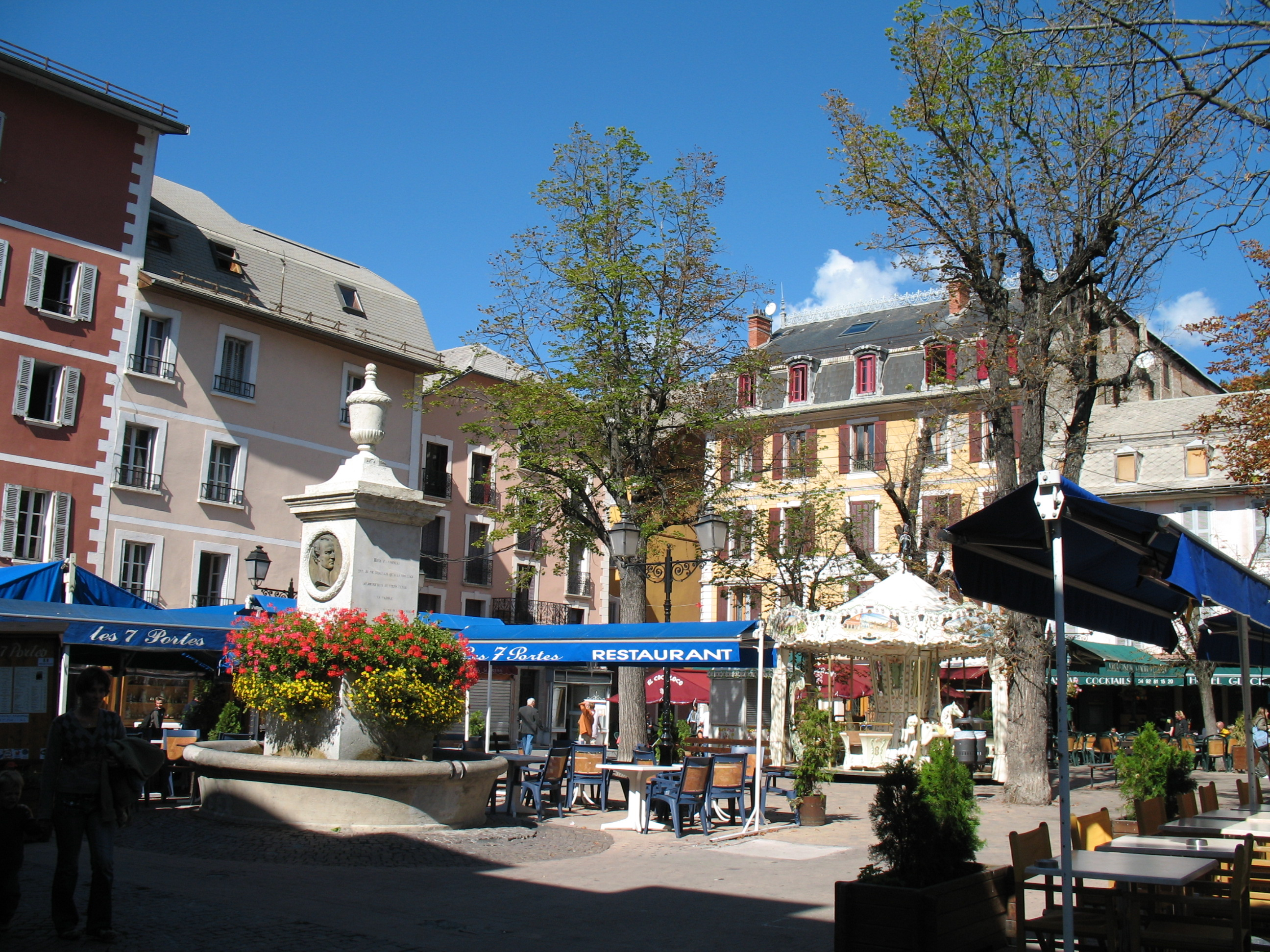
- Place Manuel

- Coat of arms
- Location of Barcelonnette
- Location within France Location within Provence-Alpes-Côte d'Azur
- Coordinates: 44°23′12″N 6°39′11″E
- Country: France
- Region: Provence-Alpes-Côte d'Azur
- Department: Alpes-de-Haute-Provence
- Arrondissement: Barcelonnette
- Canton: Barcelonnette

Government
  - Mayor (2026–32): Yvan Bouguyon
- Area^{1}: 16.42 km^{2} (6.34 sq mi)
- Elevation: 1,132 m (3,714 ft)
- Highest elevation: 2,680 m (8,790 ft)
- Lowest elevation: 1,115 m (3,658 ft)
- Population (2023): 2,518
  - Density: 153.3/km^{2} (397.2/sq mi)
- Time zone: UTC+01:00 (CET)
  - Summer (DST): UTC+02:00 (CEST)
- INSEE/Postal code: 04019 /04400
- ^{1} French Land Register data, which excludes lakes, ponds, glaciers > 1 km^{2} (0.386 sq mi or 247 acres) and river estuaries.

Barcelonnette (French pronunciation: [baʁsəlɔnɛt]; Occitan: Barciloneta de Provença, also Barcilona; obsolete Italian: Barcellonetta) is a commune of France and a subprefecture in the department of Alpes-de-Haute-Provence, in the Provence-Alpes-Côte d'Azur region. It is located in the southern French Alps, at the crossroads between Provence, Piedmont and the Dauphiné, and is the largest town in the Ubaye Valley. The town's inhabitants are known as Barcelonnettes.

== Toponymy ==
Barcelonnette was founded and named in 1231, by Ramon Berenguer IV, Count of Provence. While the town's name is generally seen as a diminutive form of Barcelona in Catalonia, Albert Dauzat and Charles Rostaing point out an earlier attestation of the name Barcilona in Barcelonnette in around 1200, and suggest that it is derived instead from two earlier stems signifying a mountain, *bar and *cin (the latter of which is also seen in the name of Mont Cenis).

In the Vivaro-Alpine dialect of Occitan, the town is known as Barcilona de Provença or more rarely Barciloneta according to the classical norm; under the Mistralian norm it is called Barcilouna de Prouvença or Barcilouneto. In Valéian (the dialect of Occitan spoken in the Ubaye Valley), it is called Barcilouna de Prouvença or Barcilounéta. Barcino Nova is the town's Latin name meaning "new Barcelona"; Barcino was the Roman name for Barcelona in Catalonia from its foundation by Emperor Augustus in 10 BC, and the name was changed to Barcelona only during the Middle Ages.

The inhabitants of the town are called Barcelonnettes, or Vilandroises in Valéian.

== History ==
=== Origins ===
The Barcelonnette region was populated by Ligures from the 1st millennium BC onwards, and the arrival of the Celts several centuries later led to the formation of a mixed Celto-Ligurian people, the Vesubians. Polybius described the Vesubians as belligerent but nonetheless civilised and mercantile, and Julius Caesar praised their bravery. The work History of the Gauls also places the Vesubians in the Ubaye Valley.

Following the Roman conquest of Provence, Barcelonnette was included in a small province with modern Embrun as its capital and governed by Albanus Bassalus. This was integrated soon afterwards into Gallia Narbonensis. In 36 AD, Emperor Tiberius transferred Barcelonnette to the province of the Cottian Alps. The town was known as Rigomagensium under the Roman Empire and was the capital of a civitas (a provincial subdivision), though no Roman money has yet been found in the canton of Barcelonnette.

=== Medieval town ===
The town of Barcelonnette was founded in 1231 by Ramon Berenguer IV, Count of Provence. According to Charles Rostaing, this act of formal "foundation", according certain privileges to the town, was a means of regenerating the destroyed town of Barcilona. The town was afforded a consulat (giving it the power to administer and defend itself) in 1240.

Control of the area in the Middle Ages swung between the Counts of Savoy and of Provence. In 1388, after Count Louis II of Provence had left to conquer Naples, the Count of Savoy Amadeus VIII took control of Barcelonnette; however, it returned to Provençal control in 1390, with the d'Audiffret family as its lords. On the death of Louis II in 1417 it reverted to Savoy, and, although Count René again retook the area for Provence in 1471, it had returned to Savoyard dominance by the start of the 16th century, by which point the County of Provence had become united with the Kingdom of France due to the death of Count Charles V in 1481.

=== Ancien Régime ===
During Charles V's invasion of Provence in 1536, Francis I of France sent the Count of Fürstenberg's 6000 Landsknechte to ravage the area in a scorched earth policy. Barcelonnette and the Ubaye Valley remained under French sovereignty until the second Treaty of Cateau-Cambrésis on 3 April 1559.

In 1588 the troops of François, Duke of Lesdiguières entered the town and set fire to the church and convent during their campaign against the Duke of Savoy. In 1600, after the Treaty of Vervins, conflict returned between Henry IV of France and Savoy, and Lesdiguières retook Barcelonnette until the conclusion of the Treaty of Lyon on 17 January the following year. In 1628, during the War of the Mantuan Succession, Barcelonnette and the other towns of the Ubaye Valley were pillaged and burned by Jacques du Blé d'Uxelles and his troops, as they passed through towards Italy to the Duke of Mantua's aid. The town was retaken by the Duke of Savoy in 1630; and in 1691 it was captured by the troops of the Marquis de Vins during the War of the League of Augsburg.

Between 1614 and 1713, Barcelonnette was the seat of one of the four prefectures under the jurisdiction of the Senate of Nice. At this time, the community of Barcelonnette successfully purchased the seigneurie of the town as it was put to auction by the Duke of Savoy; it thereby gained its own justicial powers. In 1646, a college was founded in Barcelonnette.

A "significant" part of the town's inhabitants had, by the 16th century, converted to Protestantism, and were repressed during the French Wars of Religion.

The viguerie of Barcelonnette (also comprising Saint-Martin and Entraunes) was reattached to France in 1713 as part of a territorial exchange with the Duchy of Savoy during the Treaties of Utrecht. The town remained the site of a viguerie until the French Revolution. A decree of the council of state on 25 December 1714 reunited Barcelonnete with the general government of Provence.

=== Revolution ===
Barcelonnette was one of few settlements in Haute-Provence to acquire a Masonic Lodge before the Revolution, in fact having two:

- the lodge of Saint-Jean-d'Écosse des amis réunis, affiliated with the Saint-Jean-d'Écosse lodge in Marseille;
- the lodge of Saint-Jean, affiliated with the Saint-Jean-de-Jérusalem d'Avignon lodge founded in 1749.

In March 1789, riots took place as a result of a crisis in wheat production. In July, the Great Fear of aristocratic reprisal against the ongoing French Revolution struck France, arriving in the Barcelonnette area on 31 July 1789 (when the news of the storming of the Bastille first reached the town) before spreading towards Digne.

This agitation continued in the Ubaye Valley; a new revolt broke out on 14 June, and famine was declared in April 1792. The patriotic society of the commune was one of the first 21 created in Alpes-de-Haute-Provence, in spring 1792, by the envoys of the departmental administration. Around a third of the male population attended at the club. Another episode of political violence occurred in August 1792.

Barcelonnette was the seat of the District of Barcelonnette from 1790 to 1800.

=== Modern history ===
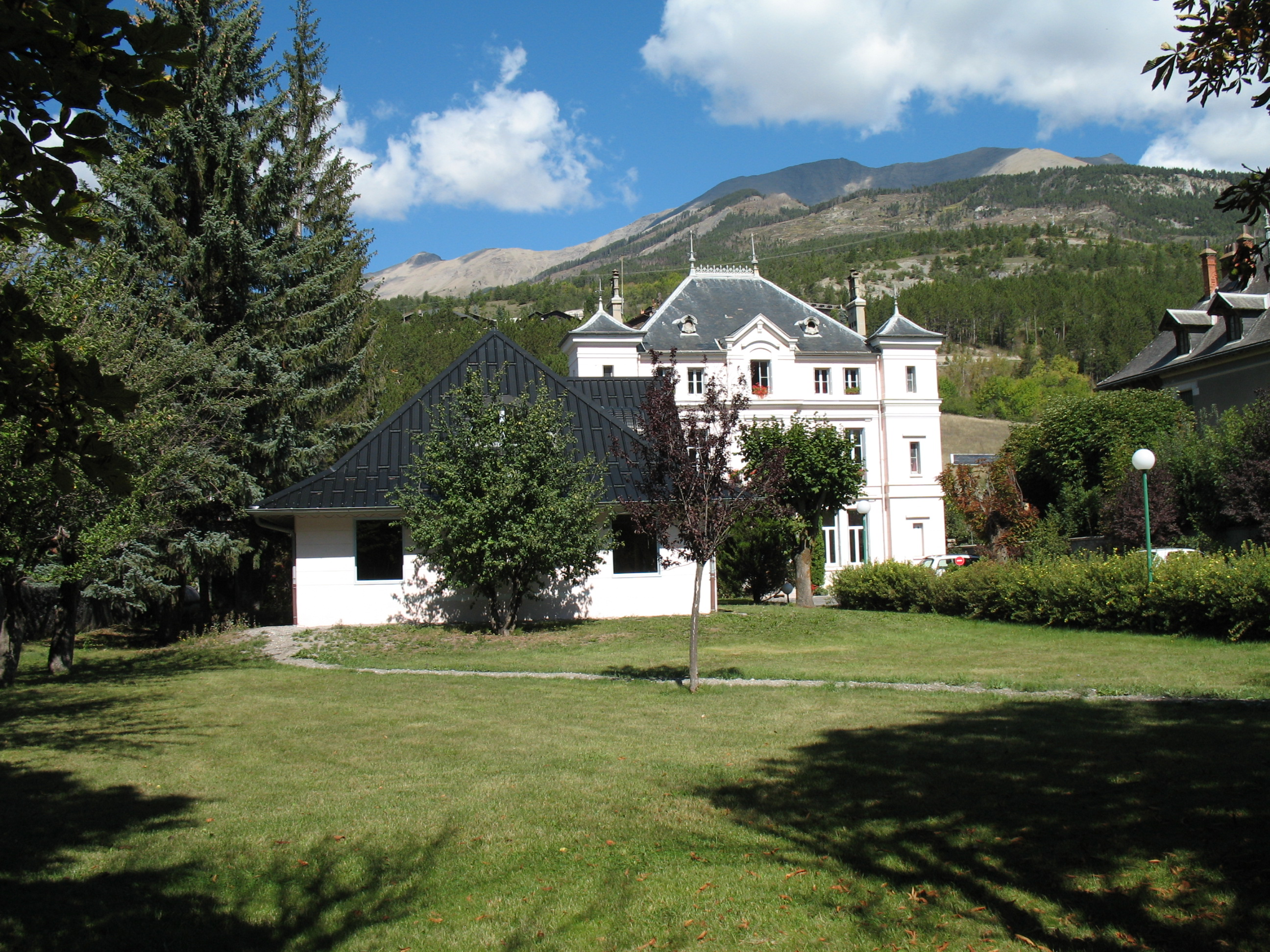
A maison mexicaine in Barcelonnette

In December 1851, the town was home to a movement of republican resistance towards Napoleon III's coup. Though only a minority of the population, the movement rebelled on Sunday 7 December, the day after the news of the coup arrived. Town officials and gendarmes were disarmed and placed in the maison d'arrêt. A committee of public health was created on 8 December; on 9 December the inhabitants of Jausiers and its surroundings formed a colony under the direction of general councillor Brès, and Mayor Signoret of Saint-Paul-sur-Ubaye. This was stopped, however, on 10 December before it could reach Barcelonnette, as the priest of the subprefecture had intervened. On 11 December, several officials escaped and found refuge in L'Argentière in Piedmont. The arrival of troops on 16 December put a final end to the republican resistance without bloodshed, and 57 insurgents were tried; 38 were condemned to deportation (though several were pardoned in April).

Between 1850 and 1950, Barcelonnette was the source of a wave of emigration to Mexico. Among these emigrants was Jean Baptiste Ebrard, founder of the Liverpool department store chain in Mexico. On the edges of Barcelonnette and Jausiers there are several houses and villas of colonial style (known as maisons mexicaines), constructed by emigrants to Mexico who returned to France between 1870 and 1930. One of these maisons is Villa Costebelle. A plaque in the town commemorates the deaths of ten Mexican citizens who returned to Barcelonnette to fight in the First World War.

During the Second World War, 26 Jews were arrested in Barcelonnette before being deported. The 89th compagnie de travailleurs étrangers (Company of Foreign Workers), consisting of foreigners judged as undesirable by the Third Republic and the Vichy regime and committed to forced labour, was established in Barcelonnette.

The 11th Battalion of Chasseurs alpins was garrisoned at Barcelonnette between 1948 and 1990.

== Geography ==
Barcelonnette is situated in the wide and fertile Ubaye Valley, of which it is the largest town. It lies at an elevation of 1132 m (3717 ft) on the right bank of the Ubaye River, and is surrounded by mountains which reach peaks of over 3000 m; the tallest of these is the Needle of Chambeyron at 3412 m. Barcelonnette is situated 210 km from Turin, 91 km from Nice and 68 km from Gap.

=== Biodiversity ===
As a result of its relief and geographic situation, the Ubaye Valley has an "abundance of plant and animal species". The fauna is largely constituted of golden eagles, marmots, ibex and vultures, and the flora includes a large proportion of larches, génépis and white asphodels.

=== Climate ===
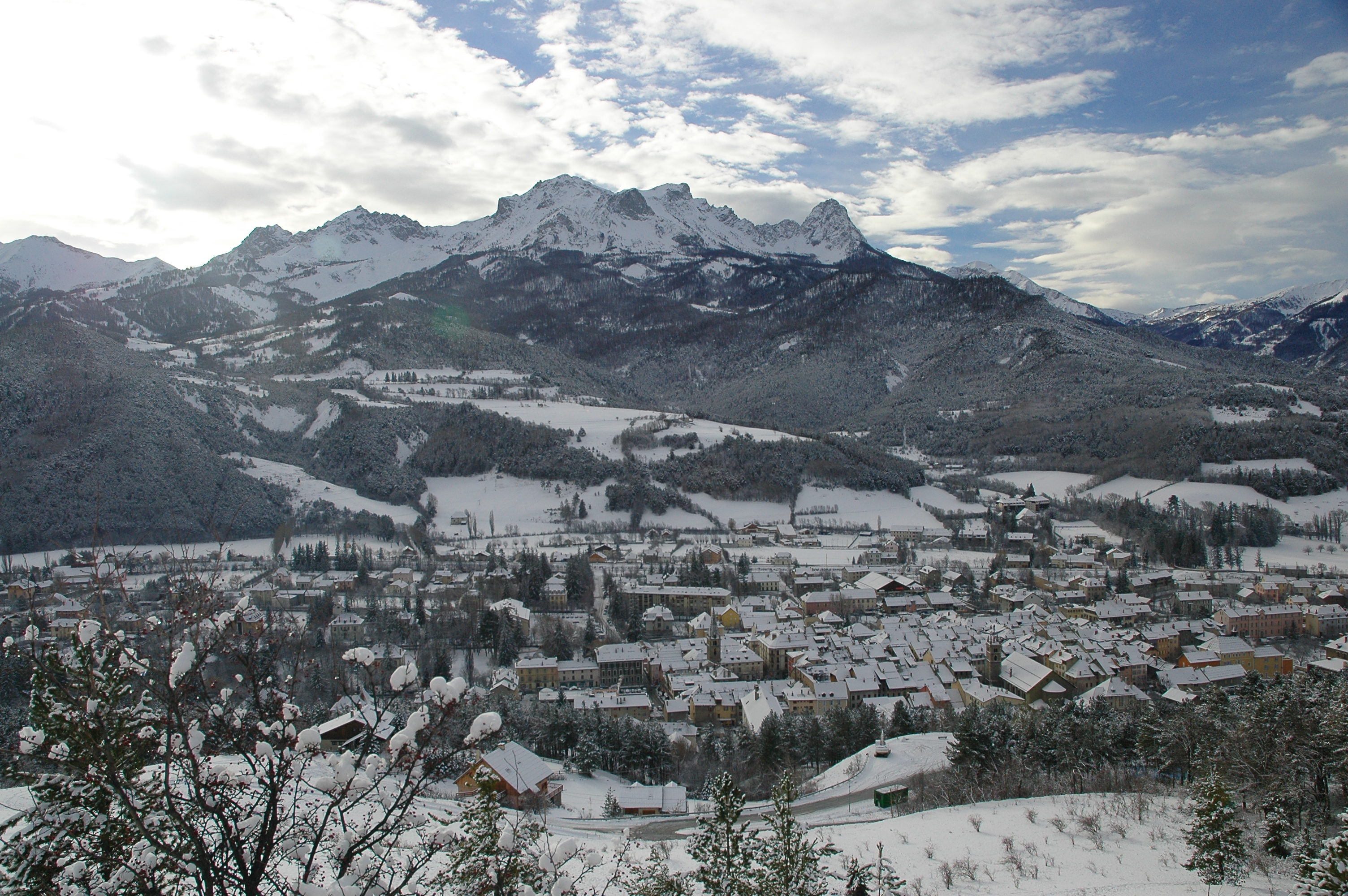
Barcelonnette in winter

The Ubaye Valley has an alpine climate and winters are harsh as a result of the altitude, but there are only light winds as a result of the relief. There are on average almost 300 days of sun and 700 mm of rain per year.

Climate data for Barcelonnette, 1155m (1991−2020 normals, extremes 1927−present)
Month	Jan	Feb	Mar	Apr	May	Jun	Jul	Aug	Sep	Oct	Nov	Dec	Year
Record high °C (°F)	17.6 (63.7)	20.5 (68.9)	24.0 (75.2)	27.7 (81.9)	30.5 (86.9)	36.7 (98.1)	34.9 (94.8)	35.7 (96.3)	32.1 (89.8)	28.3 (82.9)	21.4 (70.5)	17.1 (62.8)	36.7 (98.1)
Mean daily maximum °C (°F)	6.2 (43.2)	8.0 (46.4)	12.3 (54.1)	15.1 (59.2)	19.3 (66.7)	23.7 (74.7)	26.3 (79.3)	26.1 (79.0)	21.4 (70.5)	16.5 (61.7)	10.2 (50.4)	6.3 (43.3)	16.0 (60.7)
Daily mean °C (°F)	−0.8 (30.6)	0.4 (32.7)	4.3 (39.7)	7.4 (45.3)	11.4 (52.5)	15.1 (59.2)	17.4 (63.3)	17.1 (62.8)	13.1 (55.6)	9.0 (48.2)	3.7 (38.7)	−0.2 (31.6)	8.2 (46.7)
Mean daily minimum °C (°F)	−7.9 (17.8)	−7.3 (18.9)	−3.6 (25.5)	−0.3 (31.5)	3.4 (38.1)	6.5 (43.7)	8.4 (47.1)	8.0 (46.4)	4.9 (40.8)	1.4 (34.5)	−2.9 (26.8)	−6.7 (19.9)	0.3 (32.6)
Record low °C (°F)	−24.8 (−12.6)	−25.0 (−13.0)	−20.0 (−4.0)	−11.4 (11.5)	−7.4 (18.7)	−4.1 (24.6)	−0.1 (31.8)	−2.5 (27.5)	−5.4 (22.3)	−13.0 (8.6)	−18.5 (−1.3)	−23.6 (−10.5)	−25.0 (−13.0)
Average precipitation mm (inches)	43.6 (1.72)	33.3 (1.31)	41.6 (1.64)	59.5 (2.34)	64.1 (2.52)	57.2 (2.25)	49.4 (1.94)	49.2 (1.94)	63.7 (2.51)	84.5 (3.33)	88.3 (3.48)	59.9 (2.36)	694.3 (27.34)
Average precipitation days (≥ 1.0 mm)	5.5	4.5	5.2	7.6	9.5	8.5	6.9	6.7	6.3	7.7	7.6	6.4	82.4
Source: Météo-France

=== Hazards ===
None of the 200 communes of the department is entirely free of seismic risk; the canton of Barcelonnette is placed in zone 1b (low risk) by the determinist classification of 1991 based on seismic history, and zone 4 (average risk) according to the probabilistic EC8 classification of 2011. The commune is also vulnerable to avalanches, forest fires, floods, and landslides. Barcelonnette is also exposed to the possibility of a technological hazard in that road transport of dangerous materials is allowed to pass through on the RD900.

The town has been subject to several orders of natural disaster: floods and mudslides in 1994 and 2008, and landslides in 1996 and 1999. The strongest recorded earthquakes in the region occurred on 5 April 1959, with its epicentre at Saint-Paul-sur-Ubaye and a recorded intensity of 6.5 at Barcelonnette, and on 17 February 1947, with its epicentre at Prazzo over the Italian border.

== Architecture ==
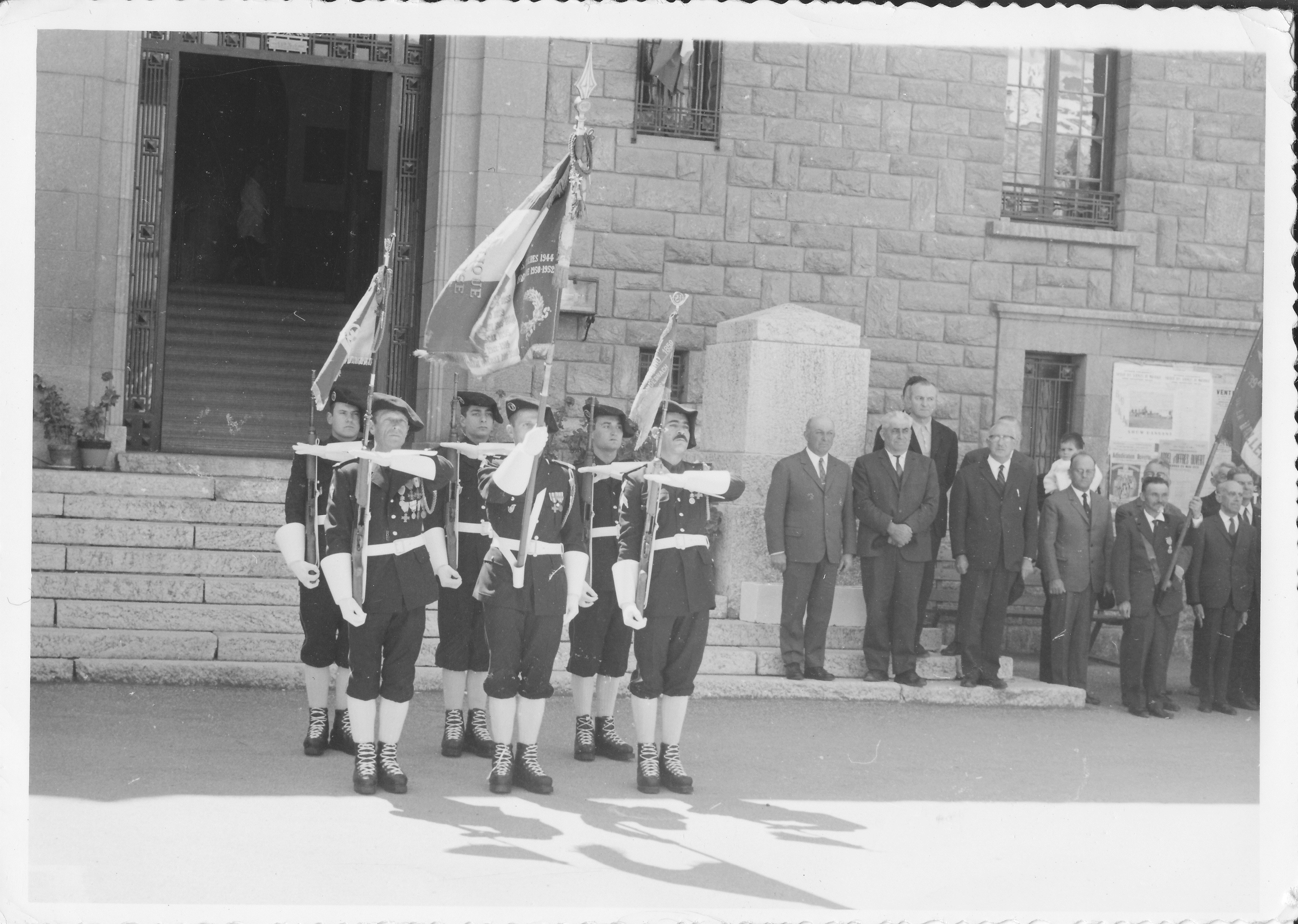
Chasseurs alpins in front of the Barcelonnette town hall in May 1970

- The town hall was constructed in the 1930s after the destruction of the Saint Maurice chapel in July 1934. Its pediment was originally from the old Dominican convent and was identified in 1988. No houses in the town date from before the 17th century, the town having been rebuilt after the fire of 1628. The old hospital in the town dates from 1717.
- The old gendarmerie on Place Manuel was originally constructed to house the subprefecture in 1825 in a neoclassical style, and its façade occupies one entire side of the square. Place Manuel was named after the Restoration politician Jacques-Antoine Manuel; the fountain in the centre of the square contains his image sculpted by David d'Angers.
- The parish church was originally built in the Middle Ages, but was destroyed in the fire of 1628. It was quickly reconstructed between 1634 and 1638, and further between 1643 and 1644. This was later demolished in 1926–27 to allow the construction of the current church, though this still contains the steeple from the 17th-century reconstruction.
- The Cardinalis tower was constructed in the 14th century as a bell tower for the Dominican convent, which was founded on the bequest of Hugh of Saint-Cher. It was damaged in the wars of the 17th century and was rebuilt, though parts still exist from the original construction. It is classed as a monument historique of France.

The subprefecture has been situated since 1978 in a maison mexicaine, the Villa l'Ubayette, constructed between 1901 and 1903.

== Population ==
Historical population
Year	Pop.	±% p.a.
1968	2,476	—
1975	2,636	+0.90%
1982	2,735	+0.53%
1990	2,976	+1.06%
1999	2,815	−0.62%
2007	2,766	−0.22%
2012	2,634	−0.97%
2017	2,598	−0.27%
2023	2,518	−0.52%
Source: INSEE

In 1471, the community of Barcelonnette (including several surrounding parishes) comprised 421 fires (households). In 1765, it had 6,674 inhabitants, but emigration, particularly to Mexico, slowed the town's growth in the period before the Second World War. As of 2023, Barcelonnette has a population of 2,518 (municipal population) across a total area of 16.42 km^{2}. The town is characterised by low population density.

== Economy ==
The city is mainly a tourist and resort centre, serving many ski lodges. The Pra-Loup resort is 7 km from Barcelonnette; Le Sauze is 5 km away. It and the Ubaye Valley are served by the Barcelonnette – Saint-Pons Airfield. Notably, Barcelonnette is the only subprefecture of France not served by rail transport; the Ubaye line which would have linked Chorges to Barcelonnette was never completed as a result of the First World War and the construction of the Serre-Ponçon Dam between 1955 and 1961.

== Education ==
An école normale (an institute for training primary school teachers) was founded in Barcelonnette in 1833, and remained there until 1888 when it was transferred to Digne. The lycée André-Honnorat de Barcelonnette, originally the collège Saint-Maurice and renamed after the politician André Honnorat in 1919, is located in the town; Pierre-Gilles de Gennes and Carole Merle both studied there. Currently, three schools exist in Barcelonnette: a public nursery school, a public elementary school, and a private school (under a contract by which the teachers are paid by the national education system).

In 2010 the lycée André-Honnorat opened a boarding school aimed at gifted students of poorer social backgrounds, in order to give them better conditions in which to study. It is located in the Quartier Craplet, formerly the garrison of the 11th Battalion of Chasseurs Alpins and then the French Army's Centre d'instruction et d'entraînement au combat en montagne (CIECM).

== Transportation ==
Barcelonnette – Saint-Pons Airfield (IATA: BAE, ICAO LFMR) is located at Saint Pons, 3 km (2 miles) west of Barcelonnette.

== International links ==
Barcelonnette is twinned with:

- Valle de Bravo, Mexico

It is also the site of a Mexican honorary consulate.

== Notable residents ==
- Jacques-Antoine Manuel (1775–1827), lawyer, politician and orator.
- Paul Reynaud (1878–1966), liberal politician and lawyer
- Pierre-Gilles de Gennes (1932–2007), physicist and winner of the Nobel Prize in Physics in 1991
- Daniel Spagnou (born 1940), UMP politician
- Bruno Dary (born 1952), general and military governor of Paris
- Pierre Bottero (1964–2009), a French writer.
