= Canton of Le Lauzet-Ubaye =

Coordinates: 44°25′51″N 6°25′58″E

Le Lauzet-Ubaye
- Former canton
- Interactive map of Le Lauzet-Ubaye
- Country: France
- Region: Provence-Alpes-Côte d'Azur
- Department: Alpes-de-Haute-Provence
- No. of communes: {{{nbcomm}}}
- Disbanded: 2015
- Area: 270.59 km^{2} (104.48 sq mi)
- Population (2012): 1,335
  - Density: 4.934/km^{2} (12.78/sq mi)

The canton of Le Lauzet-Ubaye is a former administrative division in southeastern France. It was disbanded following the French canton reorganisation which came into effect in March 2015. It consisted of 5 communes, which joined the canton of Barcelonnette in 2015. It had 1,335 inhabitants (2012).

The canton comprised the following communes:

- La Bréole
- Le Lauzet-Ubaye
- Méolans-Revel
- Pontis
- Saint-Vincent-les-Forts

== Demographics ==
Historical population Canton of Le Lauzet-Ubaye
Year	1962	1968	1975	1982	1990	1999
Pop.	738	1,087	933	975	930	1,060
±%	—	+47.3%	−14.2%	+4.5%	−4.6%	+14.0%
From the year 1962 on: No double counting – residents of multiple communes (e.g. students and military personnel) are counted only once. Source: INSEE

== See also ==
- Cantons of the Alpes-de-Haute-Provence department
