= Ubaye Valley =

Area in Alpes-de-Haute-Provence, France

Coordinates: 44.4°N 6.7°E

The Ubaye Valley is an area in the Alpes de Haute-Provence département, in the French Alps, having approximately 7,700 residents. Its residents are called Ubayens. Its principal town is the sous-préfecture of Barcelonnette.

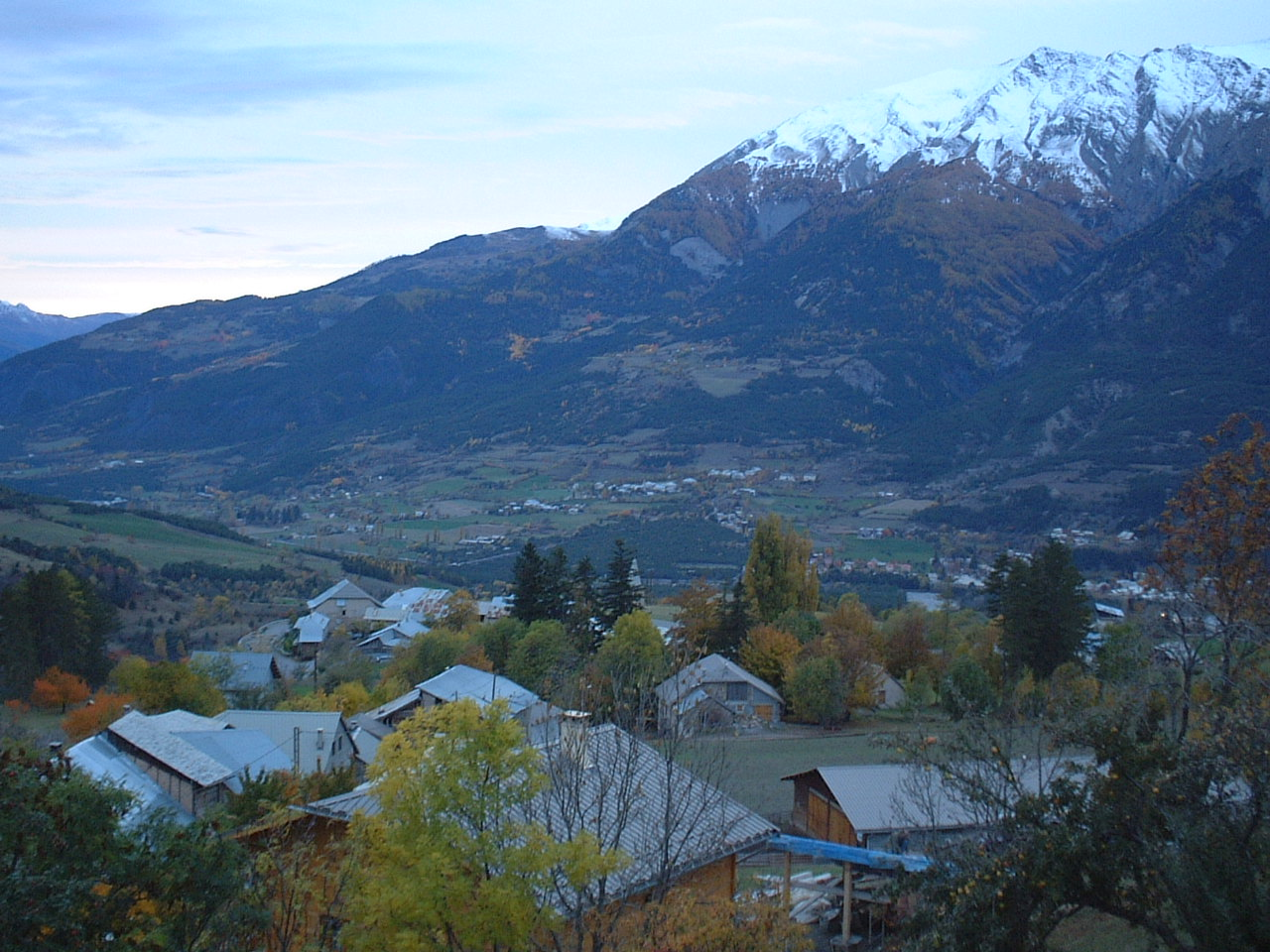
A view of the Ubaye valley

== Ubaye River - Hydrography ==
- The Ubaye River gives its name to the valley. The Ubaye rises on the Franco-Italian border, in Longet Lake, in the massif of Monte Viso. It runs from east to west for 70 km (43 mi), before it flows into Serre-Ponçon Lake. Its main tributary is the Ubayette River, which rise in the Lauzanier Lake.
- Ubaye Valley has many lakes :
  - Terre-Plaine lake
  - Neuf-Couleur Lake
  - Sagnes Lake
  - Lauzanier lake
  - Lake Allos
  - Petite Cayolle lake
  - Mans lakes
  - Longet lake
  - Oronaye lake, near Longet lake
  - Marinet Lake

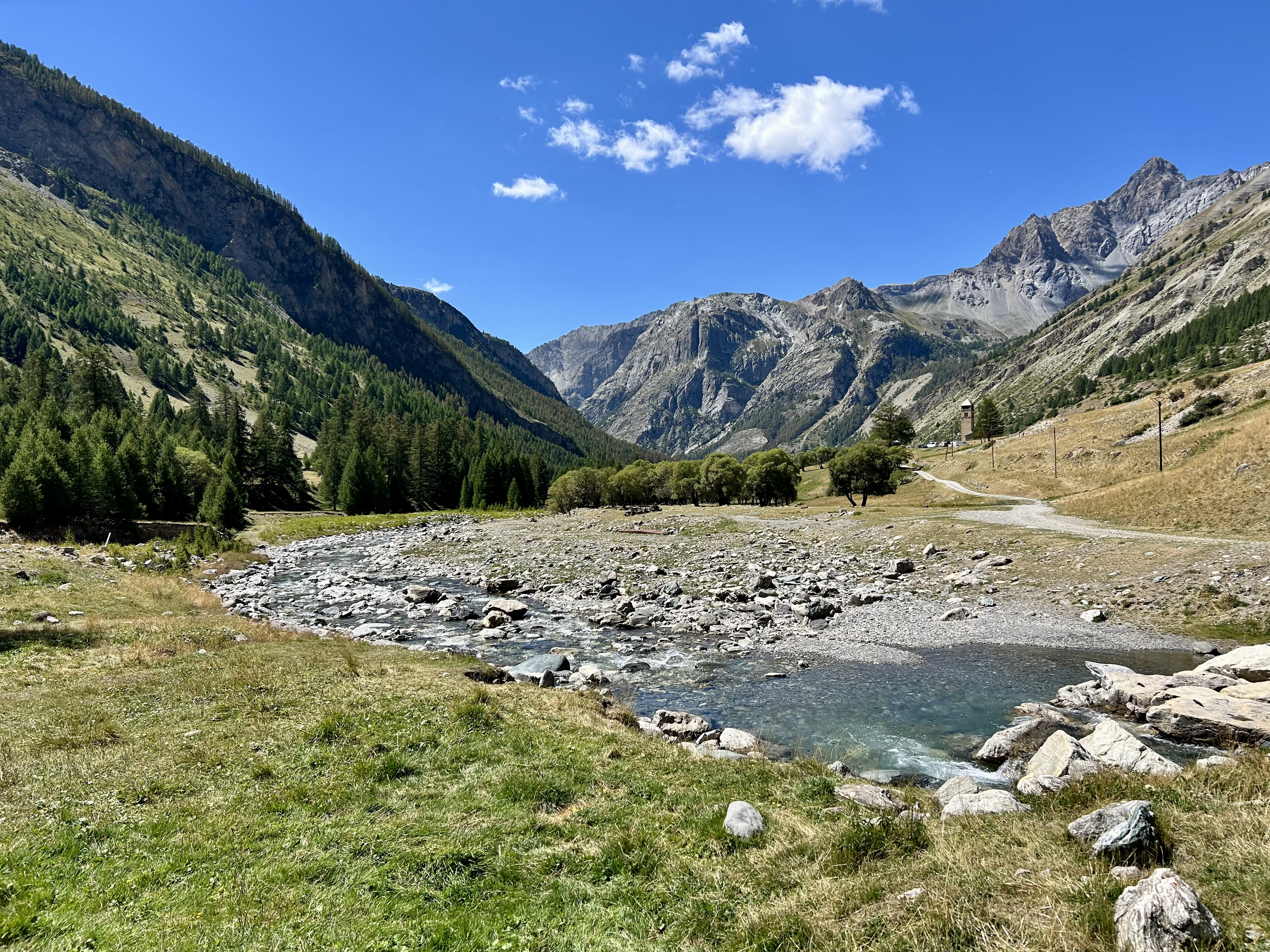
Ubaye in Saint-Paul-sur-Ubaye - Maljasset

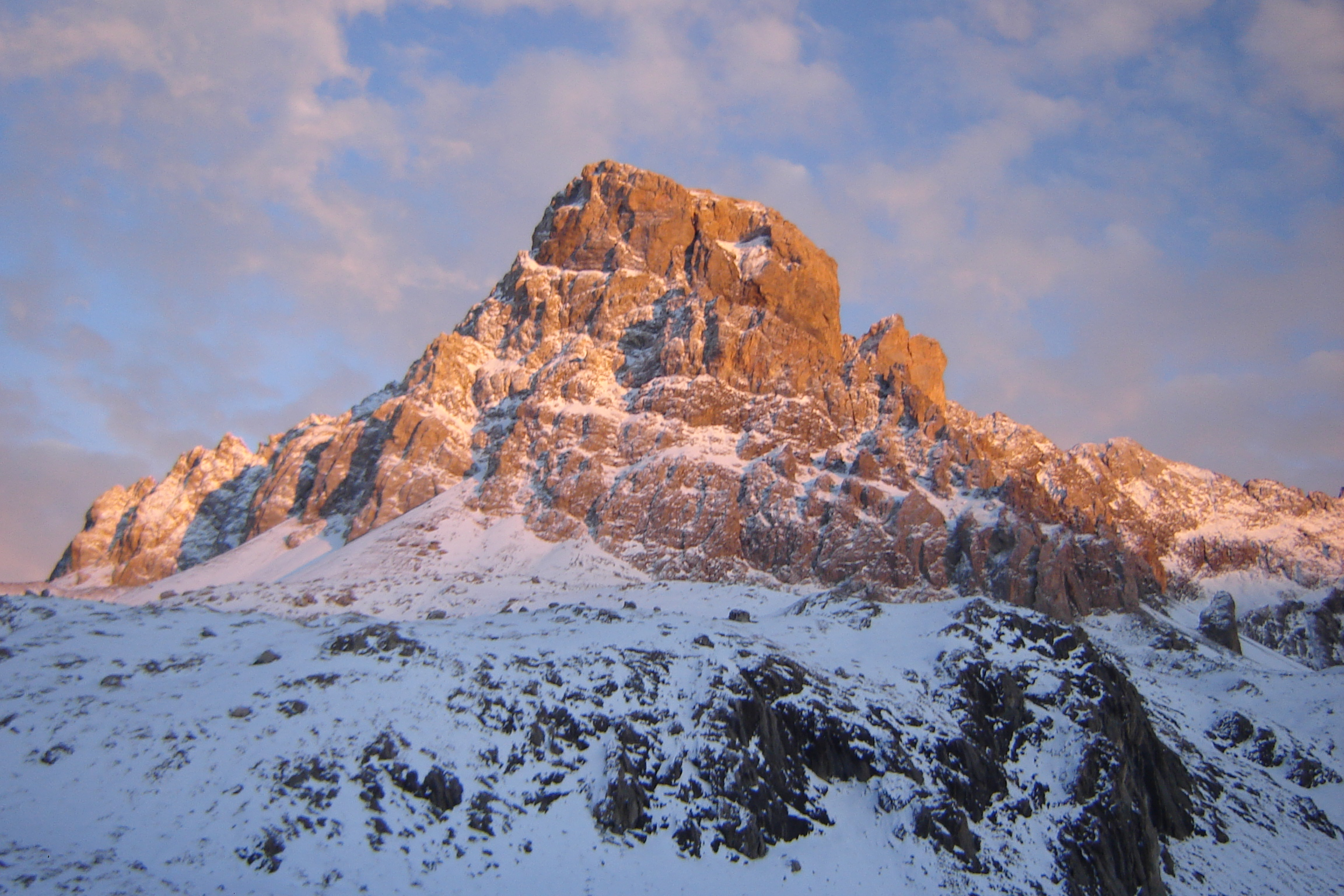
Brec de Chambeyron (3389 meters)

== Peaks ==
Ubaye Valley's highest mountain is the Aiguille de Chambeyron (3,412 m (11,194 ft)). The second one is the Brec de Chambeyron (3,389 m (11,119 ft)).

== Towns ==
- Its two largest towns are Barcelonnette and Jausiers. From Low Valley to High Valley, near Ubaye the towns are: Le Lauzet-Ubaye, Les Thuiles (Lauzet's hamlet), Méolans-Revel, Barcelonnette, Faucon-de-Barcelonnette, Jausiers, La Condamine-Châtelard, Saint-Paul-sur-Ubaye and Tournoux.
- There are several ski stations: Le Sauze, Pra-Loup (near Barcelonnette) and Sainte Anne (near La Condamine-Châtelard).
- Two small towns in the Ubayette valley: Meyronnes and Larche.

== Access ==
There are only six passable vehicle roads during the summer:

- From the Haute-Provence (West) : "Pas-la-Tour" near Le Lauzet-Ubaye, open year-round
- From the Verdon (South) : Col de la Cayolle and Col d'Allos (closed in winter)
- From the Tinée (South) : Col de la Bonette at 2,750 meters, the highest road of Alps and the highest road in Europe (closed in winter)
- From Stura Valley (Italy), (East): Pass of Col de Larche (closed in winter)
- From the Queyras (North) : Col de Vars (closed in winter).

== History ==
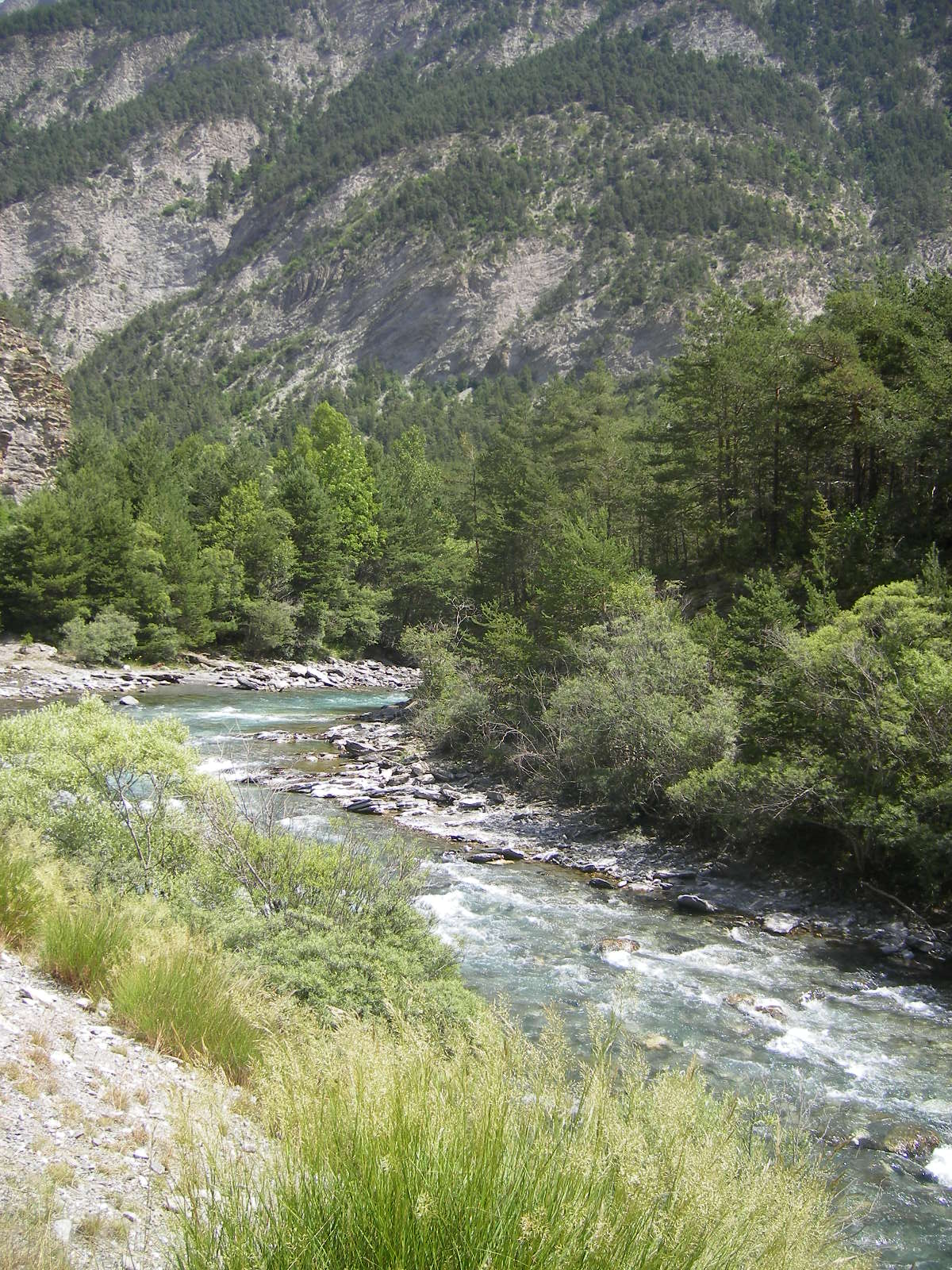
The Ubaye between La Condamine and Jausiers

- The Ubaye valley has been populated since prehistoric times.
- The Esubii, a Gaulish tribe, historically lived in the valley.
- It was incorporated into the Roman Empire by Augustus. A Roman road crossed the valley and the Romans occupied the Faucon-de-Barcelonnette's area.
- Christianized since the end of Roman Empire, Ubaye Valley belonged to the diocese of Embrun.
- The valley was in the county of Provence during the Middle Ages.
- Barcelonnette was founded in 1231 by Ramon Berenguer IV, Count of Provence.
- François Ier crossed the pass of Larche to attack Italy in the 16th century.
- Until the 1713 Treaty of Utrecht the valley was part of the Duchy of Savoy from its head to the confluence of the rivers Ubaye and Durance, and was the site of two Savoyard invasions of France in 1690 and 1692.
- The French Army of the Alps was based in Ubaye during the French Revolution.
- In the 1830s, the first real road to the valley was opened.
- During the 19th century and the start of the 20th, many of Ubaye's people emigrated to Mexico.
- Ubaye Valley was occupied by Italians in 1942, then by Germans in 1943 and 1944

== Administration ==
The valley is in the arrondissement of Barcelonnette, and has two cantons.

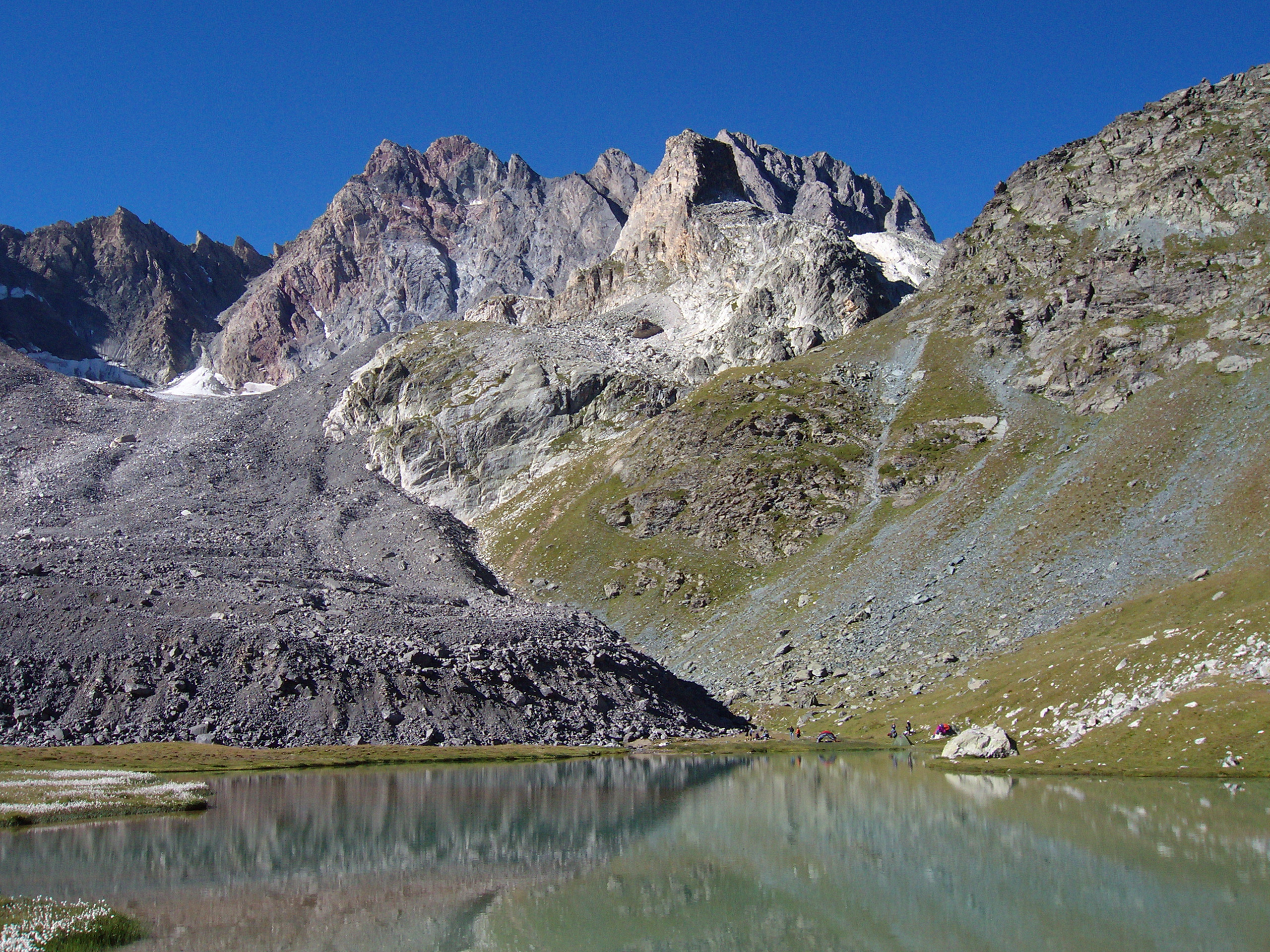
Marinet Lake

== Natural sites ==
- Lakes
- Mountains: L'Aiguille du Chambeyron, the Séolanes, Siguret, "la Tête de Louis XVI", Monte Sautron.
- The Mercantour National Park

== Monuments ==
- Cardinalis Tower (Barcelonnette)
- Museum of Ubaye Valley (Barcelonnette)
- "Les Villas Mexicaines" (Barcelonnette and Jausiers)
- Church of Faucon-de-Barcelonnette.
- Church Saint Nicolas de Myre (Jausiers)
- Magnans's Castle (Jausiers)
- Abriès Mill (Jausiers)
- Cuguret stronghold. (Jausiers)
- Fort de Tournoux (La Condamine-Châtelard)

== Notable residents ==
- Paul Reynaud, born in Barcelonnette
- The Brothers Arnaud, born in Jausiers
- Jacques-Antoine Manuel, born in Barcelonnette
- Founders of Mexico City department stores:
  - Léon Signoret (Al Puerto de Veracruz]) – born 1857, Barcelonnette; death date not found
  - Jean-Baptiste Ebrard (El Puerto de Liverpool) – born 1828, Jausiers; died January 4, 1892, Nice
  - Joseph Ollivier (La Ciudad de Londres; he bought it in 1862 rather than founding it) – born May 6, 1829, Plan-Saint-Ours, Meyronnes; died April 5, 1910, Neuilly-sur-Seine
  - Joseph Tron (El Palacio de Hierro) – born 1848, Alpes-de-Haute-Provence (village not given); death date not found
  - Joseph Léautaud (El Palacio de Hierro) and Sébastien Robert (El Centro Mercantil)
