= Ubaye =

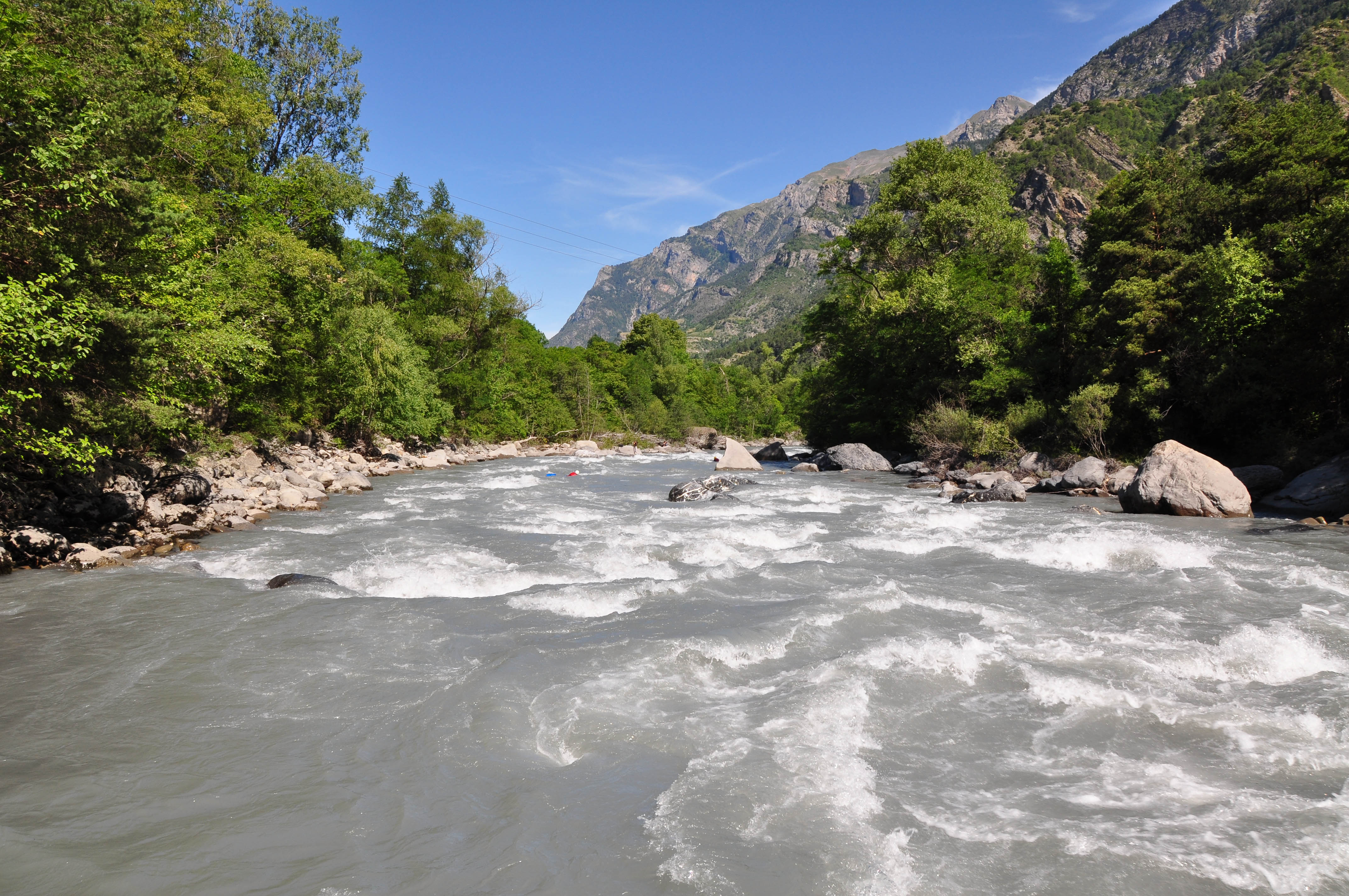

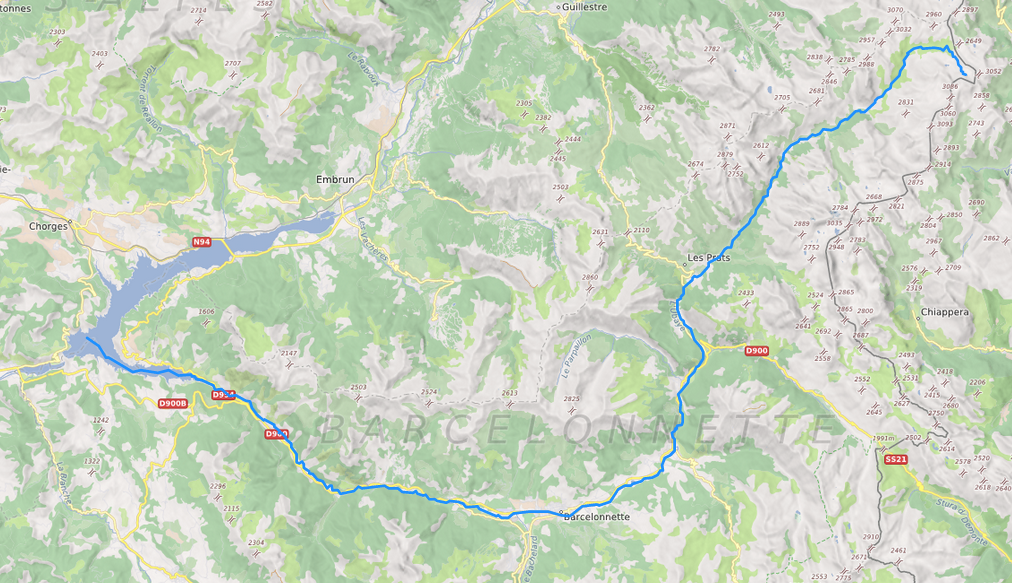

Location
- Country: France

Physical characteristics
- Source
  - location: Cottian Alps
- Mouth
  - location: Durance
  - coordinates: 44°28′31″N 6°17′52″E
- Length: 83 km (52 mi)
- Basin size: 1,009 km^{2} (390 sq mi)
- Discharge
  - average: 20.5 m^{3}/s (720 cu ft/s)

Basin features
- Progression: Durance→ Rhône→ Mediterranean Sea

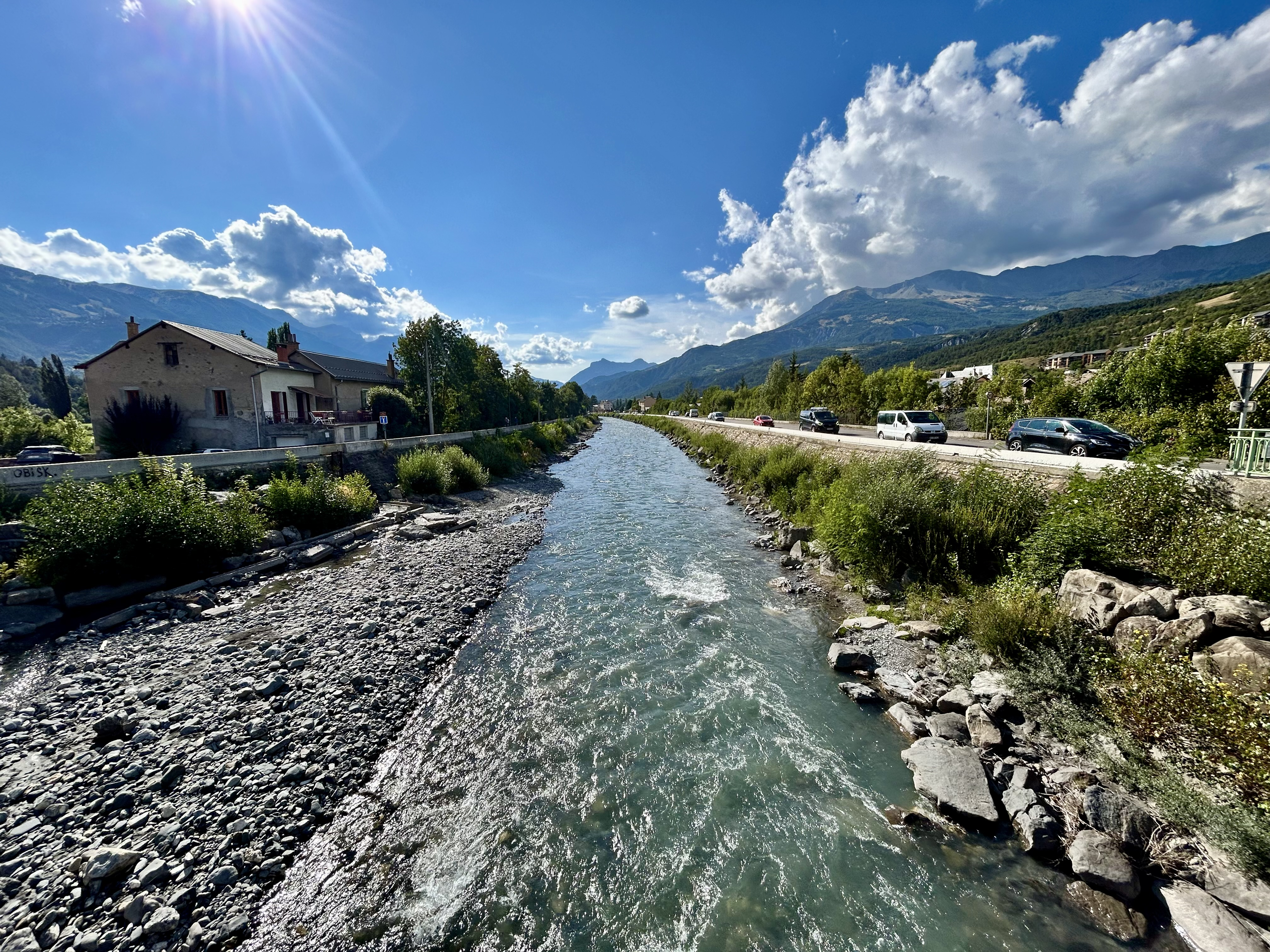
Ubaye in Barcelonnette

The Ubaye (French pronunciation: [ybaj]; Occitan: Ubaia) is a river of southeastern France. It is 83 kilometres (52 mi) long and flows through the Alpes-de-Haute-Provence department. Its drainage basin is 1,009 km^{2} (390 sq mi).

Its rises at the Col de Longet, in the Cottian Alps on the border with Italy. It flows generally southwest, through Saint-Paul-sur-Ubaye, Jausiers and Barcelonnette. It flows into the Lac de Serre-Ponçon (which is fed and drained by the Durance) near La Bréole.

== See also ==
- Ubaye Valley
- Mercantour National Park
