= Arrondissement of Barcelonnette =

Coordinates: 44.38°N 6.65°E

Barcelonnette
- Arrondissement
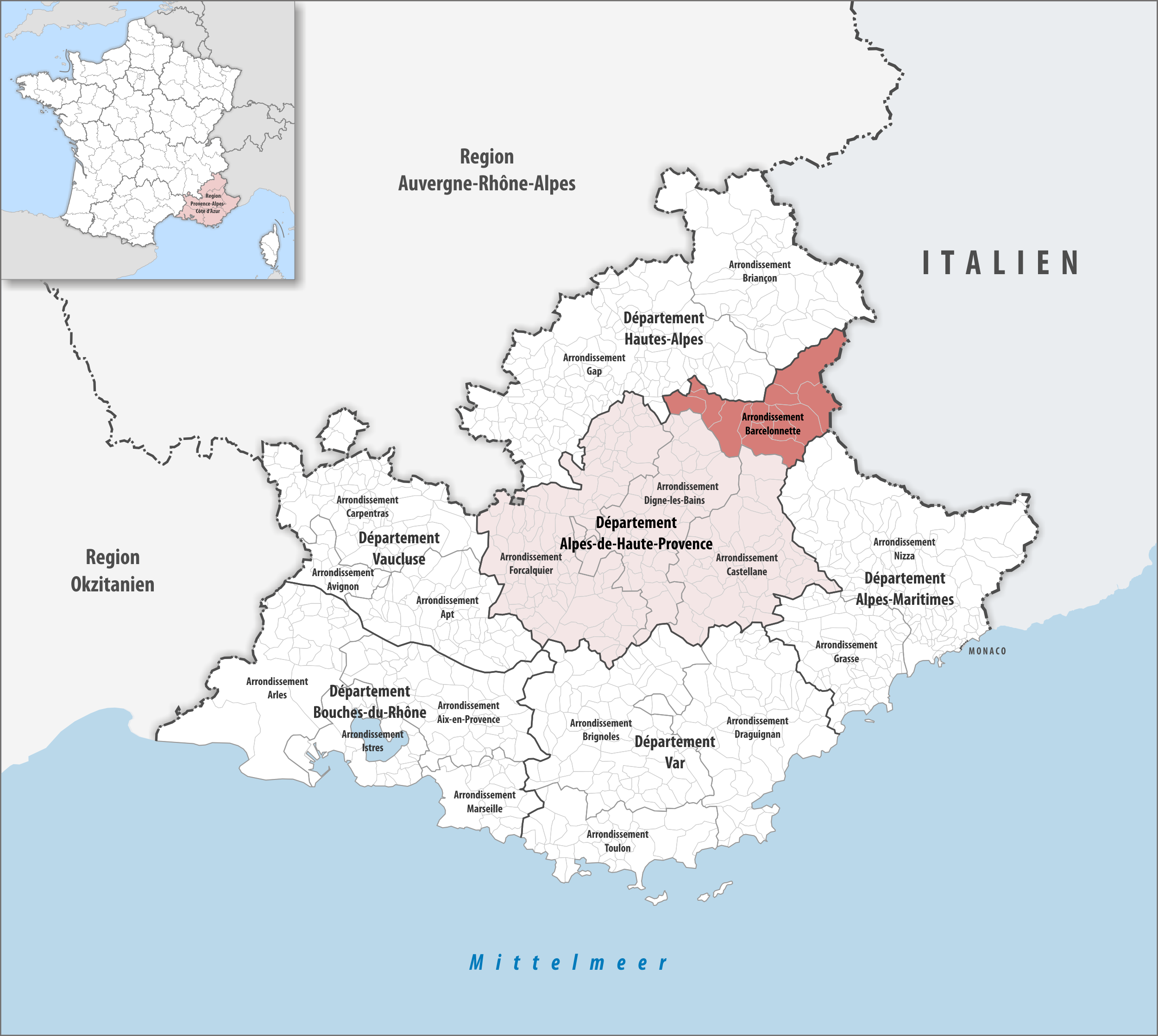
- Location within the region Provence-Alpes-Côte d'Azur
- Country: France
- Region: Provence-Alpes-Côte d'Azur
- Department: Alpes-de-Haute-Provence
- No. of communes: {{{nbcomm}}}
- Area: 1,027.7 km^{2} (396.8 sq mi)
- Population (2023): 7,737
  - Density: 7.528/km^{2} (19.50/sq mi)
- INSEE code: 041

The arrondissement of Barcelonnette is an arrondissement of France in the Alpes-de-Haute-Provence department in the Provence-Alpes-Côte d'Azur region. It has 14 communes. Its population is 7,712 (2021), and its area is 1,027.7 km^{2} (396.8 sq mi).

== Composition ==
The communes of the arrondissement of Barcelonnette, and their INSEE codes are:

1. Barcelonnette (04019)
2. La Condamine-Châtelard (04062)
3. Enchastrayes (04073)
4. Faucon-de-Barcelonnette (04086)
5. Jausiers (04096)
6. Le Lauzet-Ubaye (04102)
7. Méolans-Revel (04161)
8. Pontis (04154)
9. Saint-Paul-sur-Ubaye (04193)
10. Saint-Pons (04195)
11. Les Thuiles (04220)
12. Ubaye-Serre-Ponçon (04033)
13. Uvernet-Fours (04226)
14. Val-d'Oronaye (04120)

== History ==
The arrondissement of Barcelonnette was created in 1800.

As a result of the reorganisation of the cantons of France which came into effect in 2015, the borders of the cantons are no longer related to the borders of the arrondissements. The cantons of the arrondissement of Barcelonnette were, as of January 2015:

1. Barcelonnette
2. Le Lauzet-Ubaye
