= Col de Vars =

Mountain pass in the Alps

- Location within Alps
- Elevation: 2,108 m (6,916 ft)
- Traversed by: D 902

Third Approach
- Location: Hautes-Alpes/Alpes-de-Haute-Provence, France
- Range: Alps
- Coordinates: 44°32′20″N 6°42′10″E

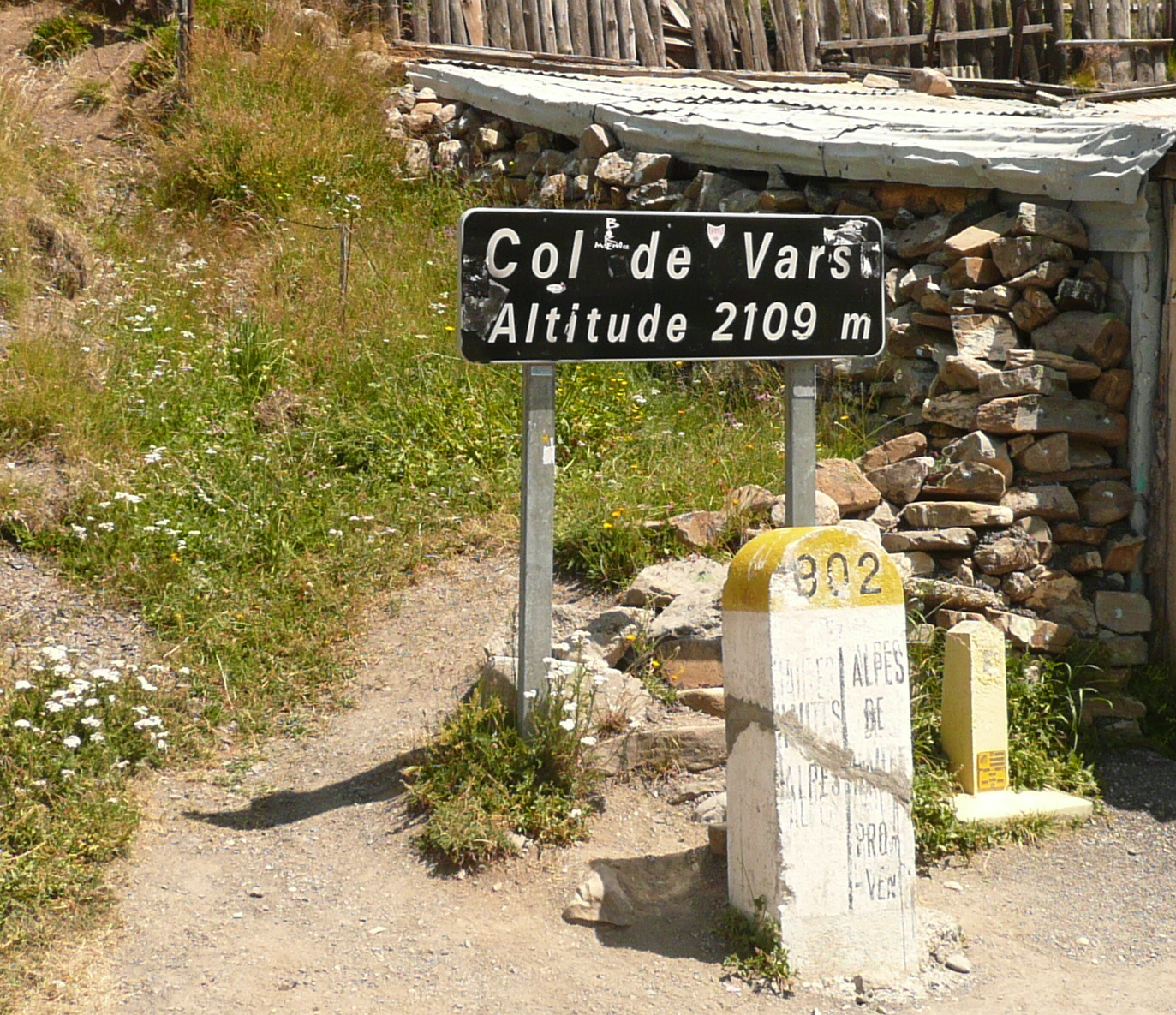
Sign on top of the pass

The Col de Vars, elevation 2108 m (6916 ft) is a high mountain pass in the Alps between the departments of Hautes-Alpes and Alpes-de-Haute-Provence in France.

It connects the Ubaye Valley with the Queyras valley and Embrun.

It is traversed by highway D 902, which leads from Saint-Paul-sur-Ubaye in the southeast to Vars and on to Guillestre in the northwest.

The pass has been included in the Tour de France 33 times since 1922, when Philippe Thys crossed the pass for the first time.

== See also ==
- List of highest paved roads in Europe
- List of mountain passes
