= Jacques-Antoine Manuel =

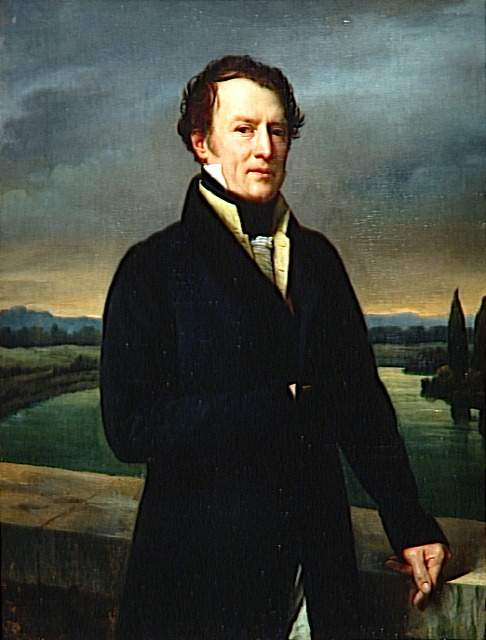
Jacques-Antoine Manuel

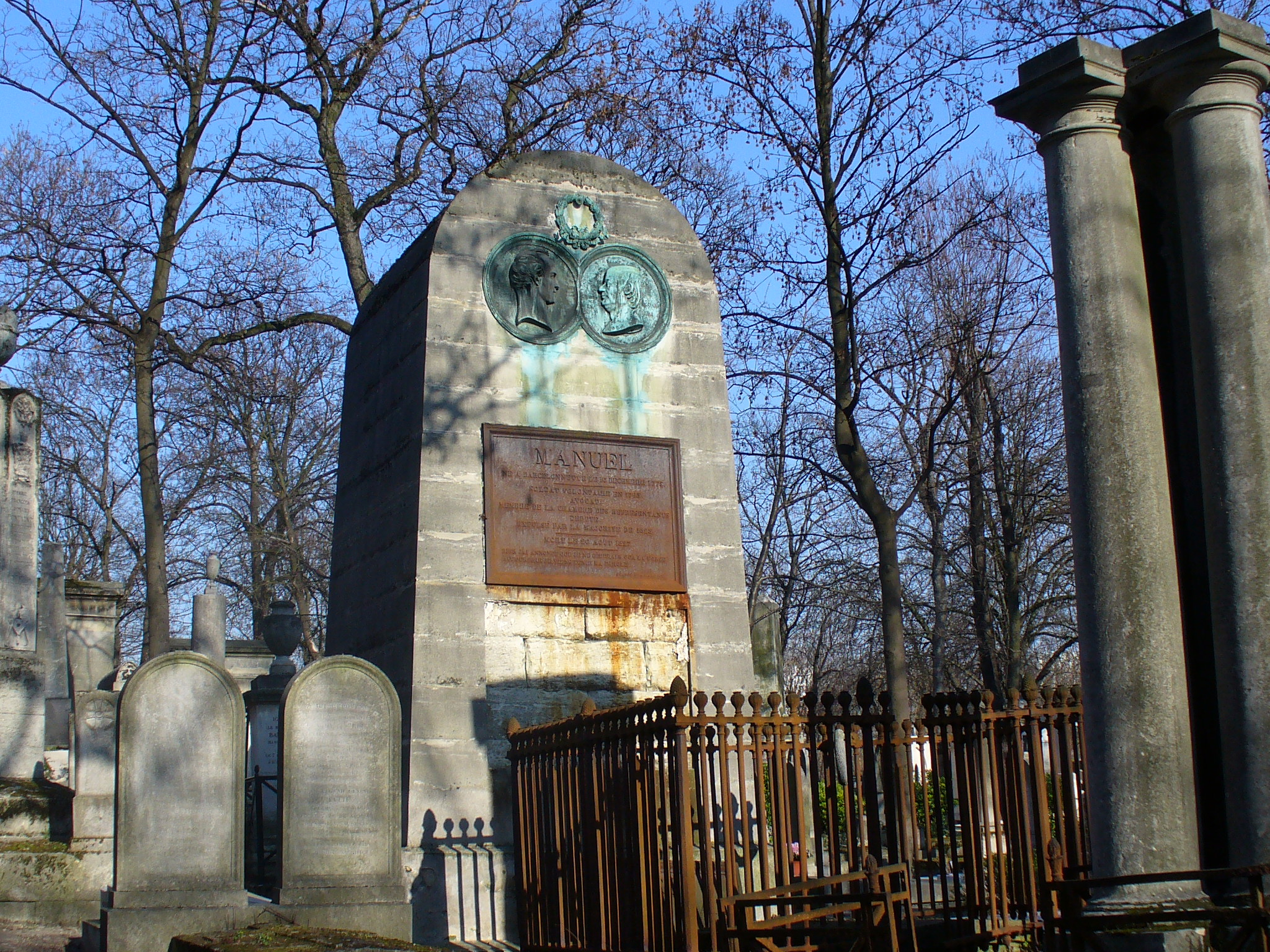
Tomb of Jacques-Antoine Manuel, buried with his friend Pierre-Jean de Béranger in Paris.

Jacques-Antoine Manuel (10 December 1775 – 20 August 1827) was a French lawyer, politician, and noted orator.

== Biography ==
Manuel was born in the hamlet of La Conchette, in Enchastrayes (Alpes-de-Haute-Provence), near Barcelonette. His family included judges and attorneys who had established careers in the Ubaye Valley. At age seventeen, he joined the army, soon becoming an officer. He fought in the Italian campaigns under Napoleon Bonaparte, notably in the Battle of the Bridge of Arcole where he was wounded ending his military career.

Manuel returned to civilian life in 1797 and practiced law. In 1814, he was chosen as a member of the Chamber of Deputies (France), and in 1815 he urged the claim of Napoleon's son to the French throne and protested against the restoration of the Bourbons. After this event, he actively opposed the government, his eloquence making him the foremost orator among the members of the Left.

In February 1823, his opposition to the French march into Spain (the Spanish Expedition) to help Ferdinand VII against his rebellious subjects produced tumult in the Chamber of Deputies. In his opposition to the French invasion, Manuel implied (although he was unable to finish speaking because he was shouted down) that the Spanish king would be in a similar position as Louis XVI had been during the Revolution, and a cornered Spanish people might react by executing Ferdinand. He meant it as a warning against intervention, but was accused of levying a "defense of regicide". In an illegal interpretation of legislative rules Manuel was expelled by the ultraroyalist majority in the Chambers, but he refused to accept this censure, and force was employed to physically remove him. The incident was mentioned by Victor Hugo in his famously scathing work "Les Châtiments" ("Castigations").

Manuel died in 1827 at age 51. His funeral cortege was followed by tens of thousands of mourners on the way to his burial at Père Lachaise Cemetery. Pierre-Jean de Béranger, the celebrated songwriter, was buried beside him 30 years later.
