= Meolans =

Meolans may refer to:

- José Meolans, Argentinian freestyle swimmer
- Méolans-Revel, a commune in southeastern France
- Piedmont ringlet (scientific name Erebia meolans), a species of butterfly
