= Pra-Loup =

Ski resort in France

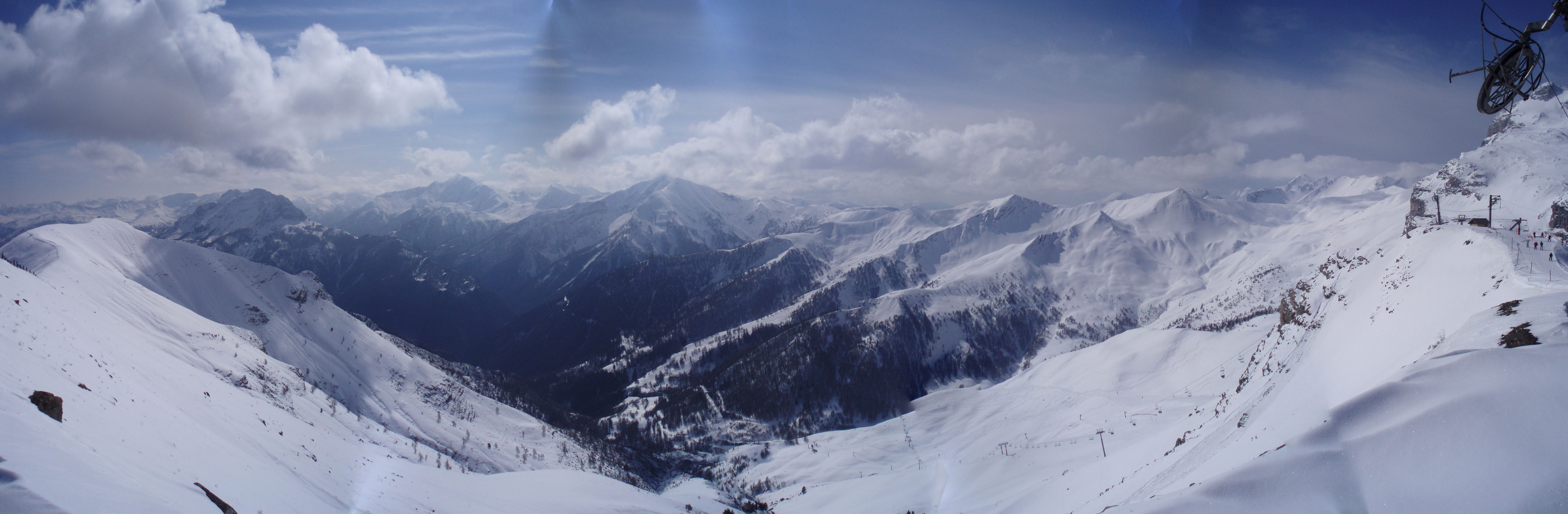
- Pra-Loup

- Location in Alps
- Location: Uvernet-Fours, Alpes-de-Haute-Provence, France
- Nearest city: Barcelonnette, France
- Coordinates: 44.369°N 6.601°E
- Vertical: 1,000 m (3,280 ft)
- Top elevation: 2,500 m (8,200 ft)
- Base elevation: 1,500 m (4,920 ft)
- Trails: 39 – 6 – Easiest – 13 – More Difficult – 17 – Most Difficult – 3 – Expert
- Total length: 180 km (110 mi)
- Website: www.praloup.com

Pra-Loup is a ski resort in France, at Uvernet-Fours in the Alpes-de-Haute-Provence, 7 km (4 mi) from the town of Barcelonnette.

== Geography ==
=== Ski area ===
The ski station has two separate base areas, 2 km apart:

- Pra-Loup 1600 - primary base area at 1,600 m (5,250 ft) above sea level
- Pra-Loup 1500 - (Les Molanès)

The lift-served summit elevation is 2,500 m (8,200 ft), for a vertical drop of 900 m (2,950 ft) to Pra-Loup 1600.

The resort has 53 lifts, 165 km (103 mi) of tracks, and its ski area is linked to that of La Foux d'Allos through the valley of Agneliers. Pra-Loup hosted the Junior World Championships for alpine skiing in 1999.

=== Climate ===
The climate is of the Alpine type.

=== Transport ===
By road:

- From Paris and the north: via Lyon, Grenoble, Gap and Barcelonnette.
- From the south of France: via Aix-en-Provence, on the A51 autoroute as far as Tallard, then in the direction of Barcelonnette.

== Toponymy ==
The name of Pra-Loup consists of Pra, Pro and lovin, derived from a patoise form Pralovin, isolated houses in a clearing and Latin lupinus "pré au loup", loup itself coming from olim le Lau, hamlet. Therefore: Pra-Loup means "meadow grown for hay, or pasture". Pra-Loup residents are called praloupiens and the praloupiennes. According to the Fénie couple, Pra-Loup is the "meadow of loup", an owner's first name.

== History ==
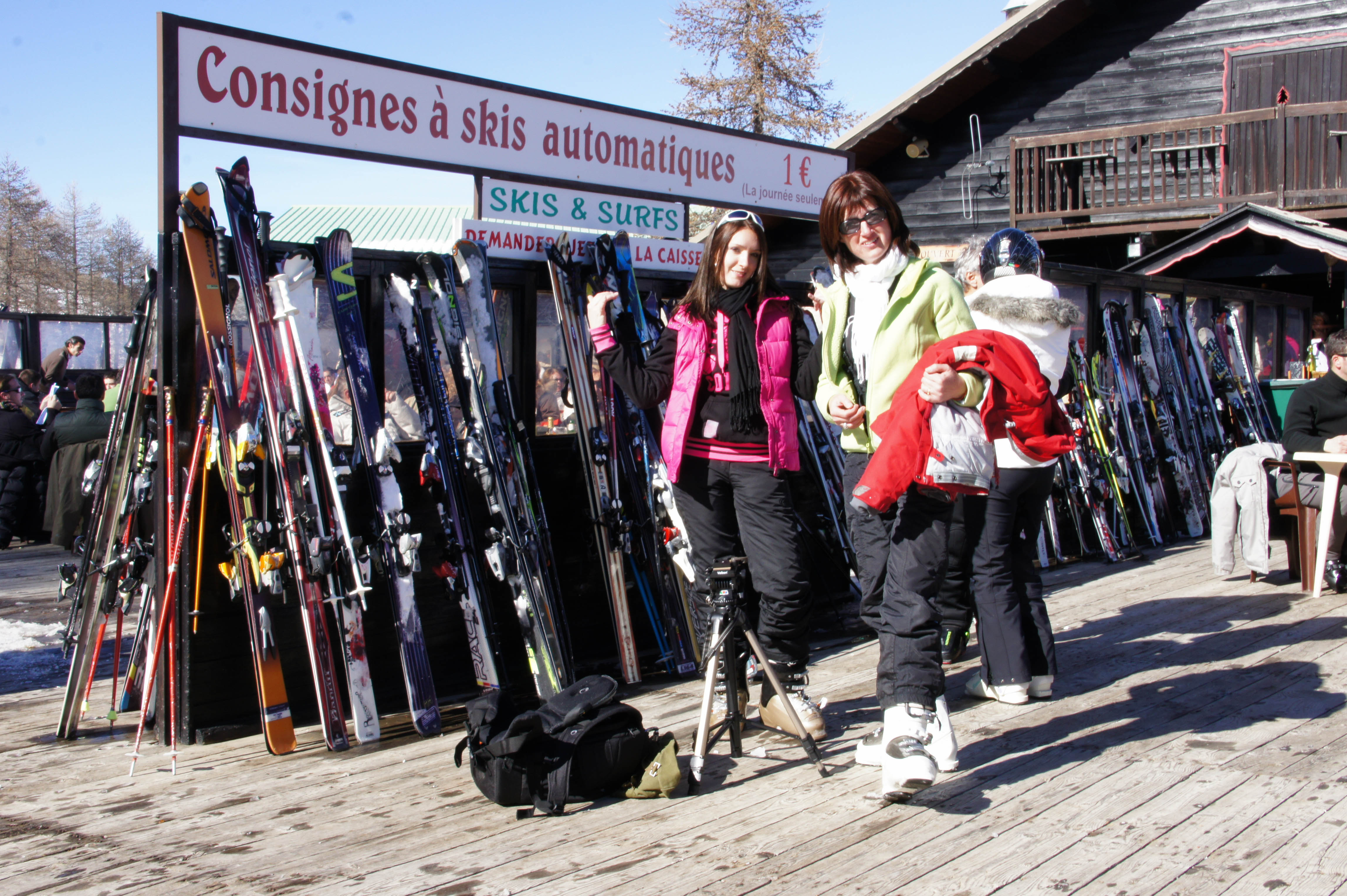
Ski cabin at Pra-Loup

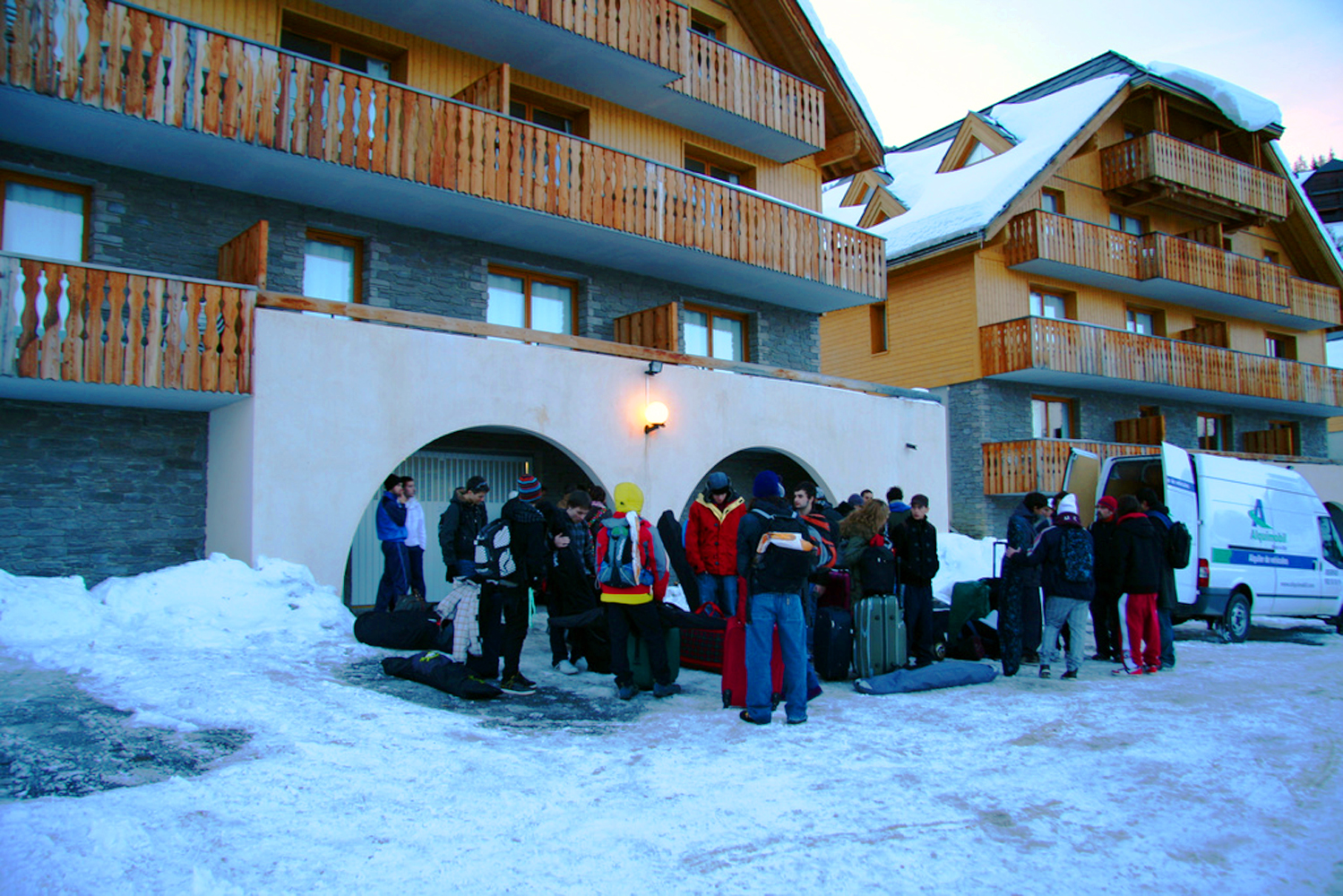
Chalets at Pra-Loup

The site of Pra-Loup has been known since the 1st century BC, with the presence of Ligurian shepherds coming from the Mediterranean, who settled here and gave birth to the local tribes. The hamlet took shape in the 12th century, the Chalaisian monks, who came via Laverq, built four formerly associated buildings: The church, the school, the priory and the presbytery. From the 14th century to the 17th century, the hamlet grew, with the construction of farms and a hostel, as well as with pastoralism.

Until 1920, the hamlets were sparsely populated, often completely self-sufficient with the mill and oven, though notably lacking drinking water. The inhabitants found an ingenious system to pick up a meagre water source by building a wooden pipeline with hollowed tree trunks, "le bournéous", visible at the Museum of Jausiers Valley. At the end of the 1950s, Pierre Grouès, a medical philanthropist, had the idea to create a skiing resort to develop the attractiveness of the village. To do this, it was surrounded by the best specialists of the moment: Émile Allais, French alpine skier and Honoré Bonnet, France's alpine ski team coach. The ski resort took shape in the 1960s. Instead of the 3,000 beds that were planned for the ski resort, Honoré Bonnet offered a capacity of 10,000 beds for reasons of profitability. From the summit of Pegueiou, he found fertile ground and also identified a possibility by the small valley of Agneliers, which later became the link with La Foux d'Allos, inaugurated in 1977. Under the leadership of Michel Lantelme, Mayor of Allos and Louis Lequette, Mayor of Uvernet-Fours, this very large-scale ski area is one of the largest in the Southern Alps.

Since 1981, Pra-Loup has been classified health resort (by decree of 13 January 1981).

== Economy ==
The Fumeton, inspired by the moutounesse, was created in Pra-Loup, chosen to be concerned with the enhancement of lamb and mutton. A delicacy of the Provence Alps, it is presented in the form of a dark red meat block and with a weight of about 1.5 kilograms (3.3 lb). Cut into thin slices, it is eaten both as an entrée and as accompaniment of mountain dishes including raclette, and also accompanies gratins, salads or pizzas. In recent years, the Fumeton has been made in Barcelonnette.

== Sport ==
=== Tour de France ===
Pra-Loup was used as the finish of stage 15 in the 1975 Tour de France. The 217 km (135 mi) race from Nice was won by Bernard Thévenet of France, and is regarded in cycling lore as the mountain climb where the career of Eddy Merckx faltered. (See Eddy Merckx - 1975 Tour de France, Pierre Chany). The French magazine Vélo called him "the most accomplished rider that cycling has ever known." The American publication, VeloNews, called him the greatest and most successful cyclist of all time. The climb is cemented into the history of French cycling by the image of a woman at the roadside, wearing a bikini, waving a sign that said: "Merckx is beaten. The Bastille has fallen."

- Elevation - 1,630 m (5,350 ft)
- Departure: Barcelonnette - 1,130 m (3,710 ft)
- Vertical rise: 500 m (1,640 ft)
- Length: 9.4 km (5.8 mi)
- Slope: 5.3% of average (maximum 10.1%)

Pra-Loup was also used as stage finishes in the 1980 Tour de France and 2015 Tour de France.

Year	Stage	Category	Start of stage	Distance (km)	Stage winner	Yellow jersey
2015	17	2	Digne-les-Bains	161	Simon Geschke (GER)	Chris Froome (GBR)
1980	16	1	Trets	207.5	Jos Deschoenmaecker (BEL)	Joop Zoetemelk (NED)
1975	15	2	Nice	217.5	Bernard Thévenet (FRA)	Bernard Thévenet (FRA)

== Bibliography ==
- Marseille, Jacques (2002). Dictionnaire de la Provence et de la Côte d'Azur [Dictionary of Provence and the Côte d'Azur] (in French). Paris: Éd. Larousse. ISBN 2035751055.
