= Les Thuiles =

- Commune
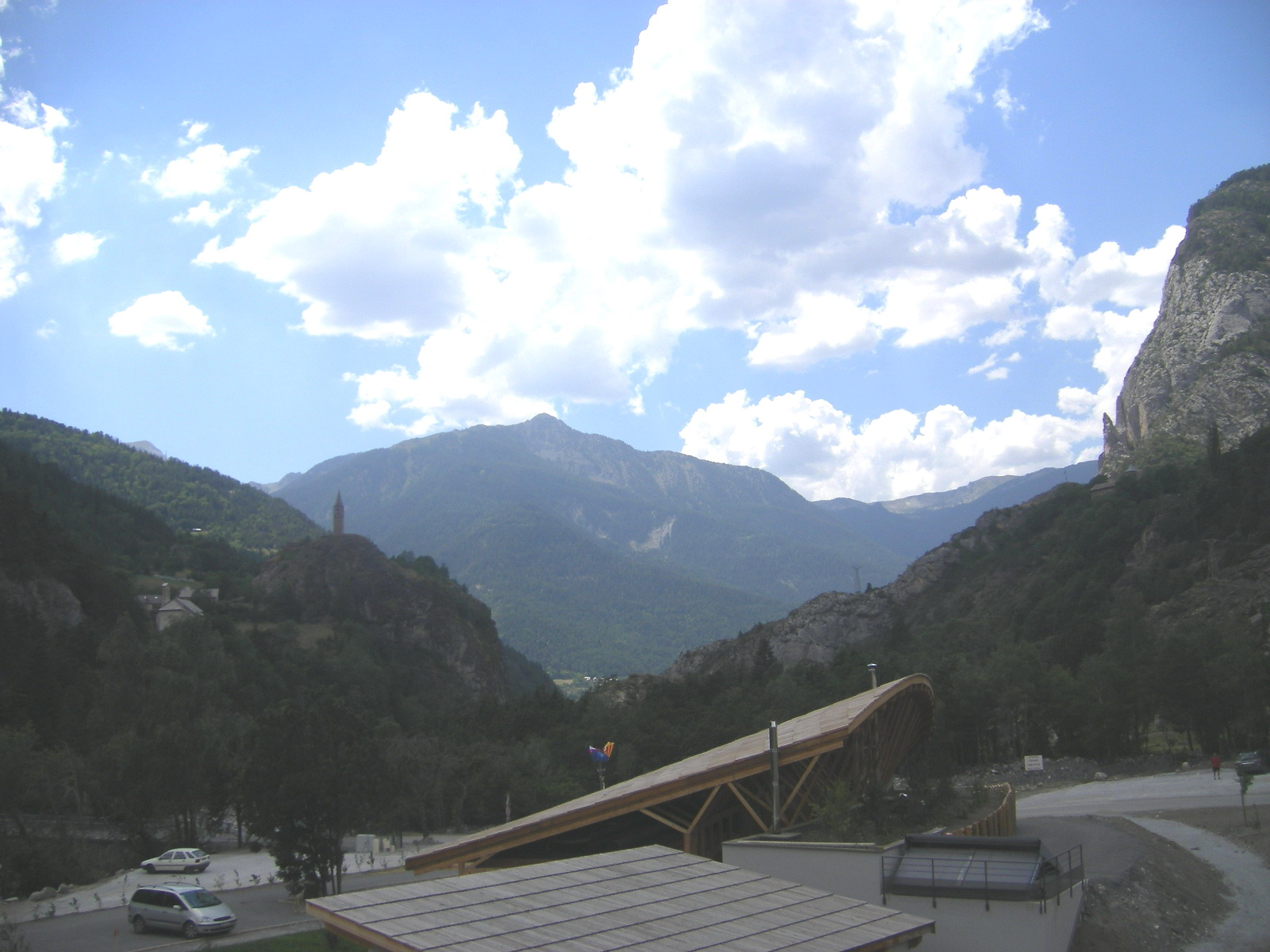
- A general view of Les Thuiles
- Location of Les Thuiles
- Location within France Location within Provence-Alpes-Côte d'Azur
- Coordinates: 44°23′38″N 6°34′19″E
- Country: France
- Region: Provence-Alpes-Côte d'Azur
- Department: Alpes-de-Haute-Provence
- Arrondissement: Barcelonnette
- Canton: Barcelonnette
- Intercommunality: Vallée de l'Ubaye - Serre-Ponçon

Government
  - Mayor (2026–32): Sandra Reynaud
- Area^{1}: 32.8 km^{2} (12.7 sq mi)
- Elevation: 1,111 m (3,645 ft)
- Highest elevation: 2,898 m (9,508 ft)
- Lowest elevation: 1,053 m (3,455 ft)
- Population (2023): 361
  - Density: 11.0/km^{2} (28.5/sq mi)
- Time zone: UTC+01:00 (CET)
  - Summer (DST): UTC+02:00 (CEST)
- INSEE/Postal code: 04220 /04400
- ^{1} French Land Register data, which excludes lakes, ponds, glaciers > 1 km^{2} (0.386 sq mi or 247 acres) and river estuaries.

Les Thuiles (French pronunciation: [le tɥil]; Occitan: Las Teulas) is a commune in the Alpes-de-Haute-Provence department in southeastern France.

== Population ==
Historical population
Year	Pop.	±% p.a.
1968	165	—
1975	184	+1.57%
1982	230	+3.24%
1990	274	+2.21%
1999	344	+2.56%
2007	386	+1.45%
2012	371	−0.79%
2017	397	+1.36%
2023	361	−1.57%
Source: INSEE

== See also ==
- Communes of the Alpes-de-Haute-Provence department
