= Brec de Chambeyron =

Mountain in Italy

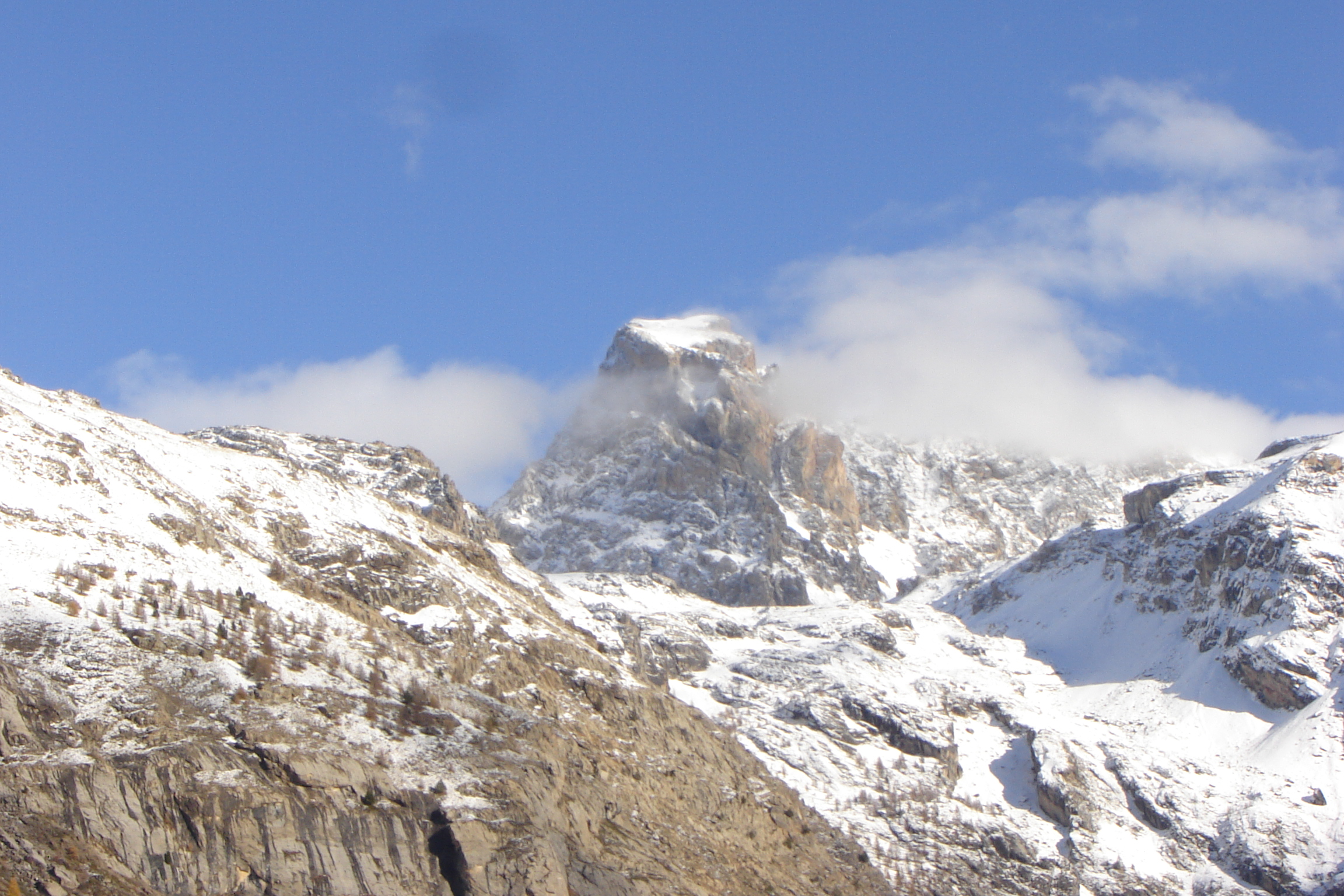
- Brec de Chambeyron

Highest point
- Elevation: 3,389 m (11,119 ft)
- Prominence: 462 m (1,516 ft)
- Isolation: 2.18 km (1.35 mi)
- Listing: Alpine mountains above 3000 m
- Coordinates: 44°31′41″N 6°51′12″E

Geography
- Location within Alps
- Location: Provence-Alpes-Côte d'Azur, France and Piedmont, Italy
- Parent range: Cottian Alps

Climbing
- First ascent: 1878

Brec de Chambeyron (3,389) is a mountain of the Cottian Alps on the border between France and Italy. It is the second highest summit of the Chambeyron Massif, after Aiguille de Chambeyron and its sharp, rocky peak dominates the Upper Ubaye Valley. The word "Brec" or "Bric" in French is used for a mountain resembling a rocky tooth. It was first climbed in 1878 by Paul Agnel and Joseph Risoul.
