= Faucon-de-Barcelonnette =

- Commune
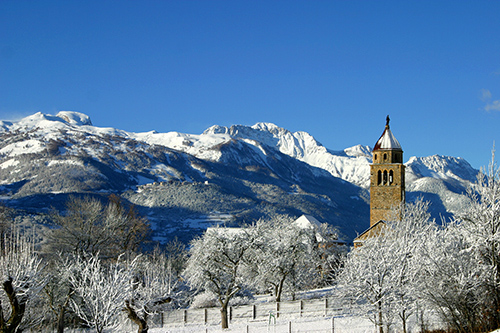
- A view of the church and the surrounding mountains in winter

- Coat of arms
- Location of Faucon-de-Barcelonnette
- Location within France Location within Provence-Alpes-Côte d'Azur
- Coordinates: 44°23′41″N 6°40′44″E
- Country: France
- Region: Provence-Alpes-Côte d'Azur
- Department: Alpes-de-Haute-Provence
- Arrondissement: Barcelonnette
- Canton: Barcelonnette
- Intercommunality: Vallée de l'Ubaye Serre-Ponçon

Government
  - Mayor (2026–32): Hélène Garcier-Richaud
- Area^{1}: 17.42 km^{2} (6.73 sq mi)
- Elevation: 1,211 m (3,973 ft)
- Highest elevation: 2,984 m (9,790 ft)
- Lowest elevation: 1,157 m (3,796 ft)
- Population (2023): 295
  - Density: 16.9/km^{2} (43.9/sq mi)
- Time zone: UTC+01:00 (CET)
  - Summer (DST): UTC+02:00 (CEST)
- INSEE/Postal code: 04086 /04400
- ^{1} French Land Register data, which excludes lakes, ponds, glaciers > 1 km^{2} (0.386 sq mi or 247 acres) and river estuaries.

Faucon-de-Barcelonnette (French pronunciation: [fokɔ̃ də baʁsəlɔnɛt], literally Faucon of Barcelonnette; Occitan: Faucon de Barcilona) is a commune in the Alpes-de-Haute-Provence department in southeastern France.

== Population ==
Historical population
Year	Pop.	±% p.a.
1968	153	—
1975	128	−2.52%
1982	113	−1.76%
1990	199	+7.33%
1999	208	+0.49%
2007	306	+4.94%
2012	305	−0.07%
2017	319	+0.90%
2023	295	−1.30%
Source: INSEE

== See also ==
- Ubaye Valley
- Communes of the Alpes-de-Haute-Provence department
