= Saint-Pons, Alpes-de-Haute-Provence =

Saint-Pons
- Commune
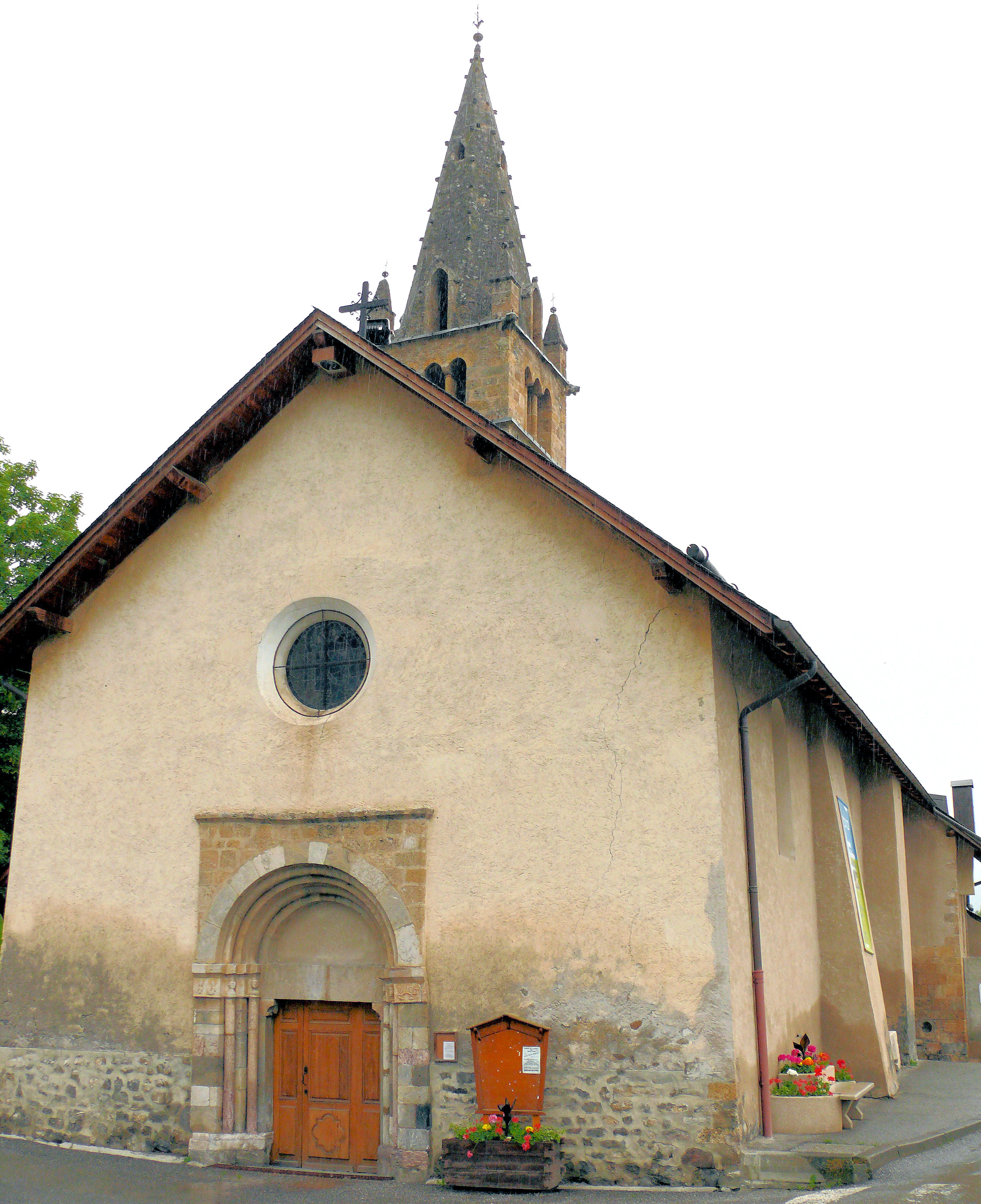
- The church in Saint-Pons
- Location of Saint-Pons
- Location within France Location within Provence-Alpes-Côte d'Azur
- Coordinates: 44°23′35″N 6°37′43″E
- Country: France
- Region: Provence-Alpes-Côte d'Azur
- Department: Alpes-de-Haute-Provence
- Arrondissement: Barcelonnette
- Canton: Barcelonnette

Government
  - Mayor (2026–32): Dominique Okroglic
- Area^{1}: 32.06 km^{2} (12.38 sq mi)
- Elevation: 1,145 m (3,757 ft)
- Highest elevation: 2,879 m (9,446 ft)
- Lowest elevation: 1,097 m (3,599 ft)
- Population (2023): 631
  - Density: 19.7/km^{2} (51.0/sq mi)
- Time zone: UTC+01:00 (CET)
  - Summer (DST): UTC+02:00 (CEST)
- INSEE/Postal code: 04195 /04400
- ^{1} French Land Register data, which excludes lakes, ponds, glaciers > 1 km^{2} (0.386 sq mi or 247 acres) and river estuaries.

Saint-Pons (French pronunciation: [sɛ̃ pɔ̃s]; Occitan: Sant Ponç) is a commune in the Alpes-de-Haute-Provence department in southeastern France.

== Population ==
Historical population
Year	Pop.	±% p.a.
1968	178	—
1975	350	+10.14%
1982	401	+1.96%
1990	507	+2.98%
1999	641	+2.64%
2007	697	+1.05%
2012	721	+0.68%
2017	626	−2.79%
2023	631	+0.13%
Source: INSEE

== See also ==
- Communes of the Alpes-de-Haute-Provence department
