= Aiguille de Chambeyron =

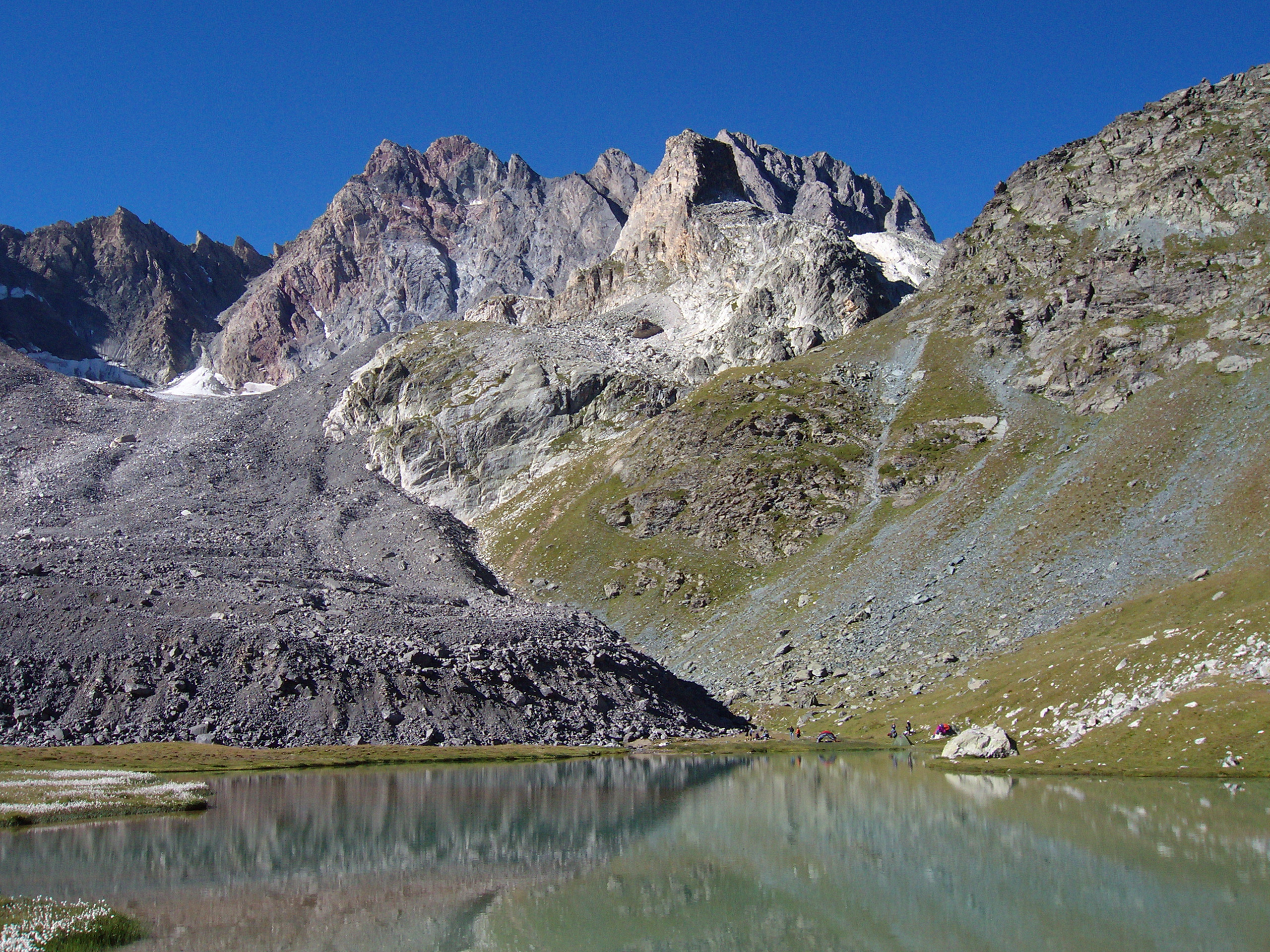
- Aiguille de Chambeyron from Lake Marinet

Highest point
- Elevation: 3,412 m (11,194 ft)
- Prominence: 771 m (2,530 ft)
- Isolation: 22.01 km (13.68 mi)
- Listing: Alpine mountains above 3000 m
- Coordinates: 44°32′51″N 6°51′22″E

Geography
- Location within Alps
- Location: Provence-Alpes-Côte d'Azur, France
- Parent range: Cottian Alps

Climbing
- First ascent: 1879

Aiguille de Chambeyron (3,412m) is a mountain of the Cottian Alps and is the highest mountain of Alpes-de-Haute-Provence in southeast France. Together with its neighbour Brec de Chambeyron, it is the dominant peak of the upper Ubaye Valley. The mountain is located near the border with Italy, just west of the Main chain of the Alps. It is the culminating point of the Massif du Chambeyron and is also the highest peak in the Alps south of Monte Viso.

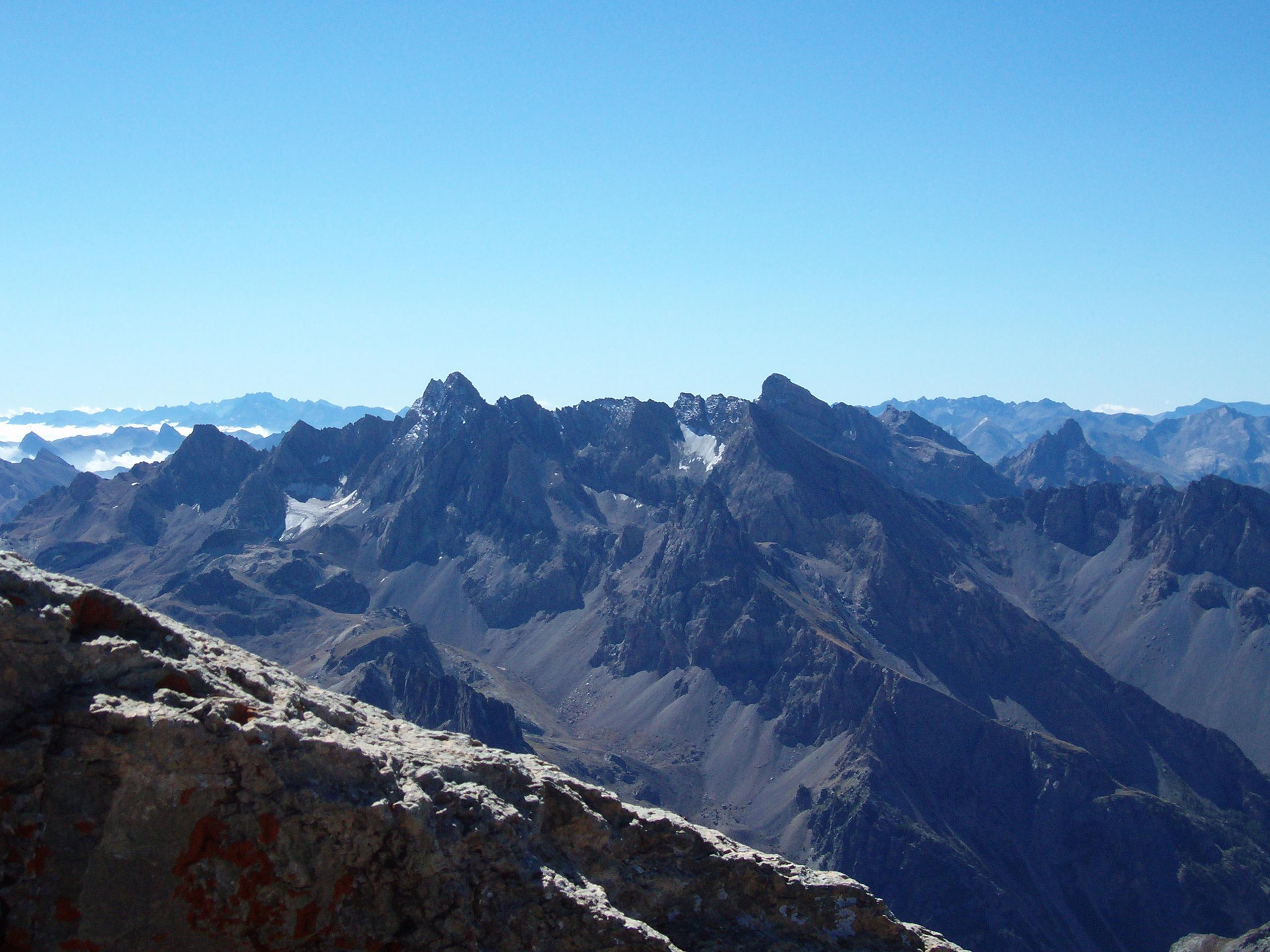
The Chambeyron Massif, with Aiguille de chambeyron near left

Aiguille de Chambeyron has two summits, with the west one being the slightly higher. Two small glaciers existed on its north side, although they have now all but vanished. W.A.B. Coolidge and Christian Almer were the first to climb Chambeyron in 1879.
