= Château des Magnans =

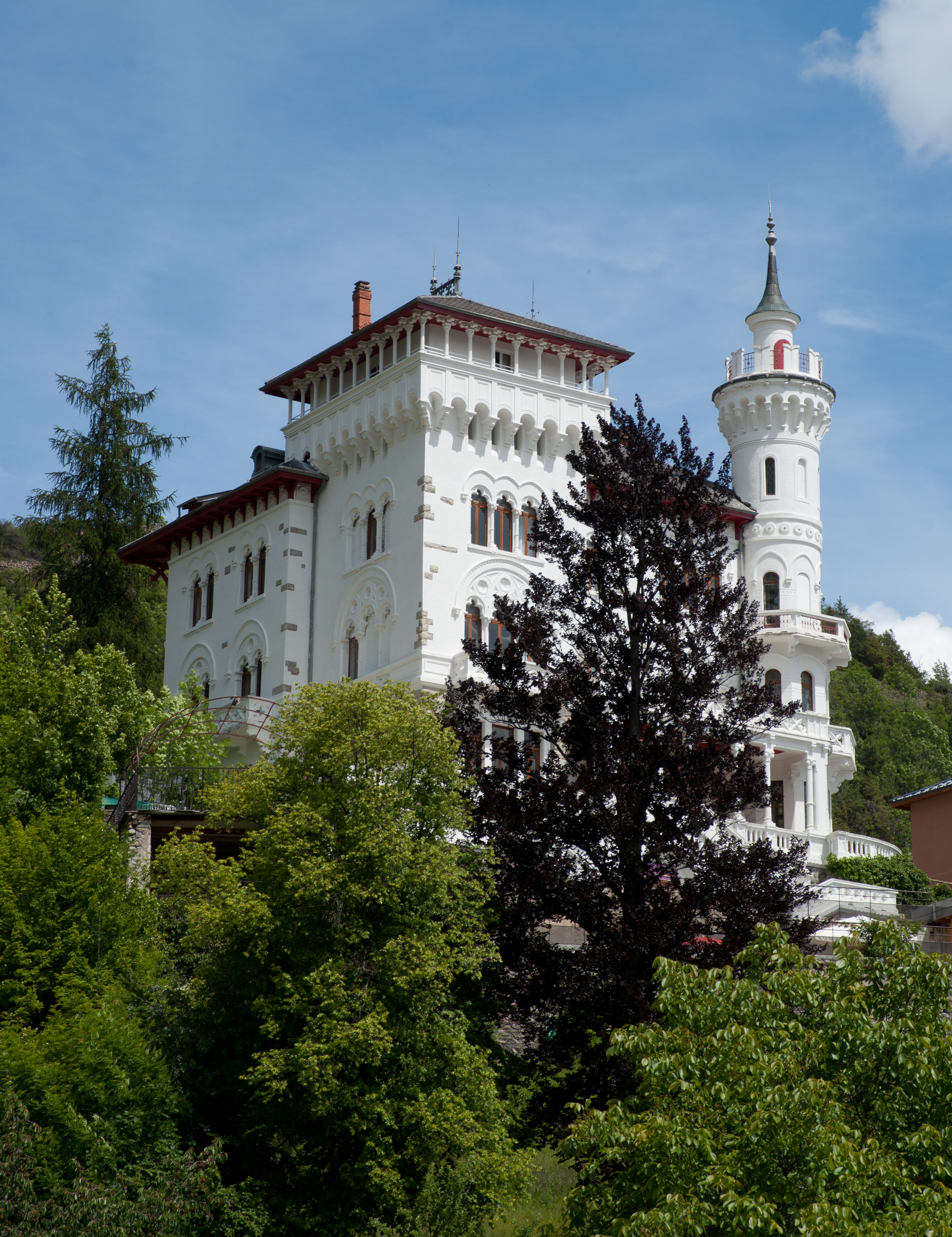
- The Château des Magnans in 2011
- Interactive map of the Château des Magnans area

General information
- Type: Château
- Location: 189 Montée des Magnans; 04850 Jausiers, France
- Coordinates: 44°25′04″N 6°44′34″E
- Construction started: 1903
- Completed: 1913
- Client: Louis Fortoul

Website
- https://chateaumagnans.popinns.com/

The Château des Magnans is a château in Jausiers, Alpes-de-Haute-Provence, Provence-Alpes-Côte d'Azur, France. It was built from 1903 to 1913 for Louis Fortoul, a French businessman who founded the department store chain Fábricas de Francia in Guadalajara, Mexico. It has been listed as an official historical monument since 1986.

== Residence ==
The château is now a 3-star tourism residence, with 63 flats on site (14 within the château itself) equipped with a panoramic swimming pool, a solarium, an indoor spa and a jacuzzi.
