= La Condamine-Châtelard =

- Commune
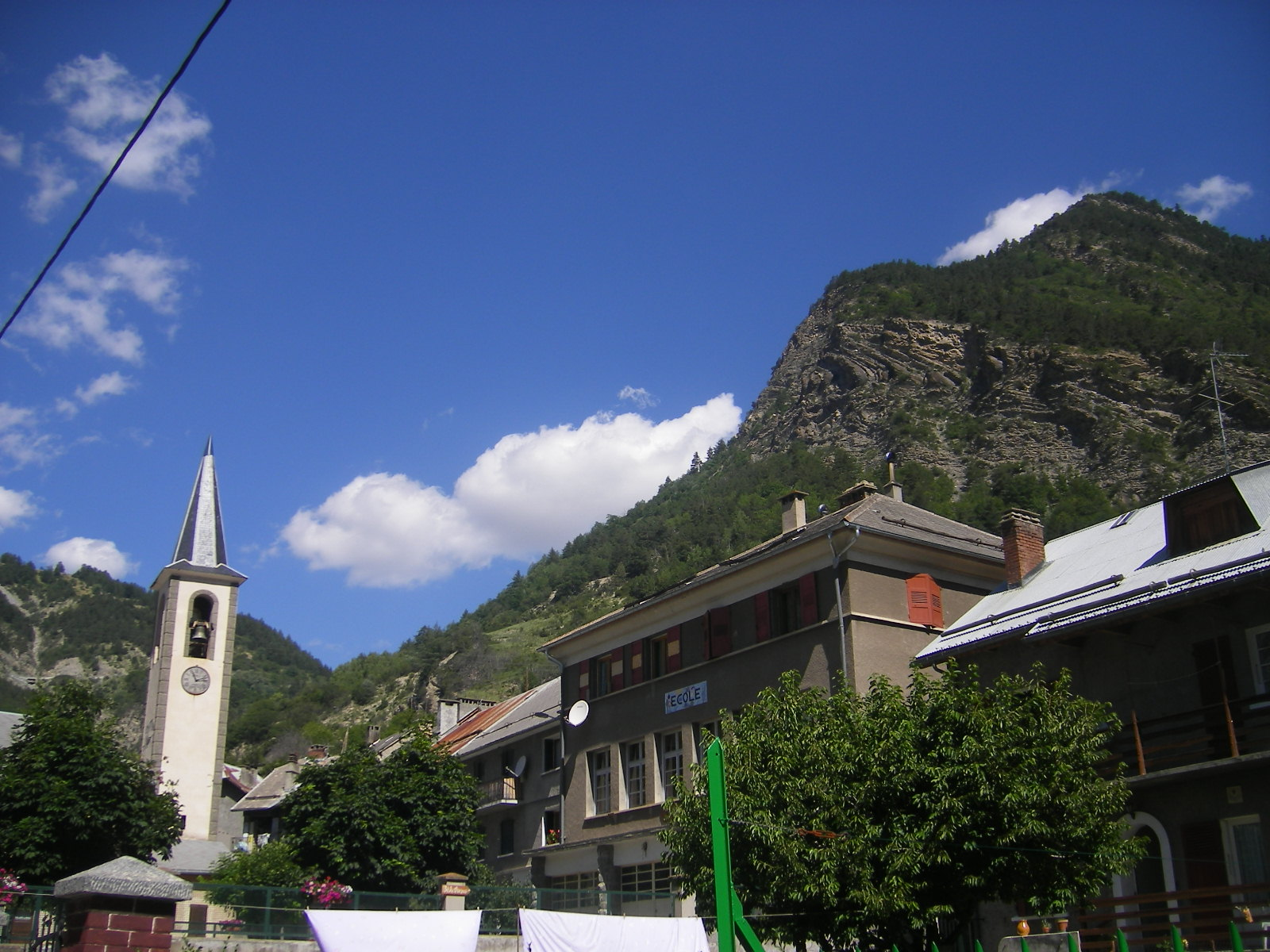
- The church, school and surrounding buildings in La Condamine-Châtelard
- Location of La Condamine-Châtelard
- Location within France Location within Provence-Alpes-Côte d'Azur
- Coordinates: 44°27′32″N 6°44′47″E
- Country: France
- Region: Provence-Alpes-Côte d'Azur
- Department: Alpes-de-Haute-Provence
- Arrondissement: Barcelonnette
- Canton: Barcelonnette

Government
  - Mayor (2026–32): Elisabeth Jacques
- Area^{1}: 56.08 km^{2} (21.65 sq mi)
- Elevation: 1,305 m (4,281 ft)
- Highest elevation: 3,047 m (9,997 ft)
- Lowest elevation: 1,239 m (4,065 ft)
- Population (2023): 154
  - Density: 2.75/km^{2} (7.11/sq mi)
- Time zone: UTC+01:00 (CET)
  - Summer (DST): UTC+02:00 (CEST)
- INSEE/Postal code: 04062 /04530
- ^{1} French Land Register data, which excludes lakes, ponds, glaciers > 1 km^{2} (0.386 sq mi or 247 acres) and river estuaries.

La Condamine-Châtelard (French pronunciation: [la kɔ̃damin ʃatlaʁ]; Occitan: La Condamina e lo Chastelar) is a commune in the Alpes-de-Haute-Provence department in southeastern France.

== Population ==
Historical population
Year	Pop.	±% p.a.
1968	200	—
1975	195	−0.36%
1982	198	+0.22%
1990	168	−2.03%
1999	166	−0.13%
2007	147	−1.51%
2012	196	+5.92%
2017	155	−4.59%
2023	154	−0.11%
Source: INSEE

== See also ==
- Ubaye Valley
- Communes of the Alpes-de-Haute-Provence department
