= Uvernet-Fours =

- Commune
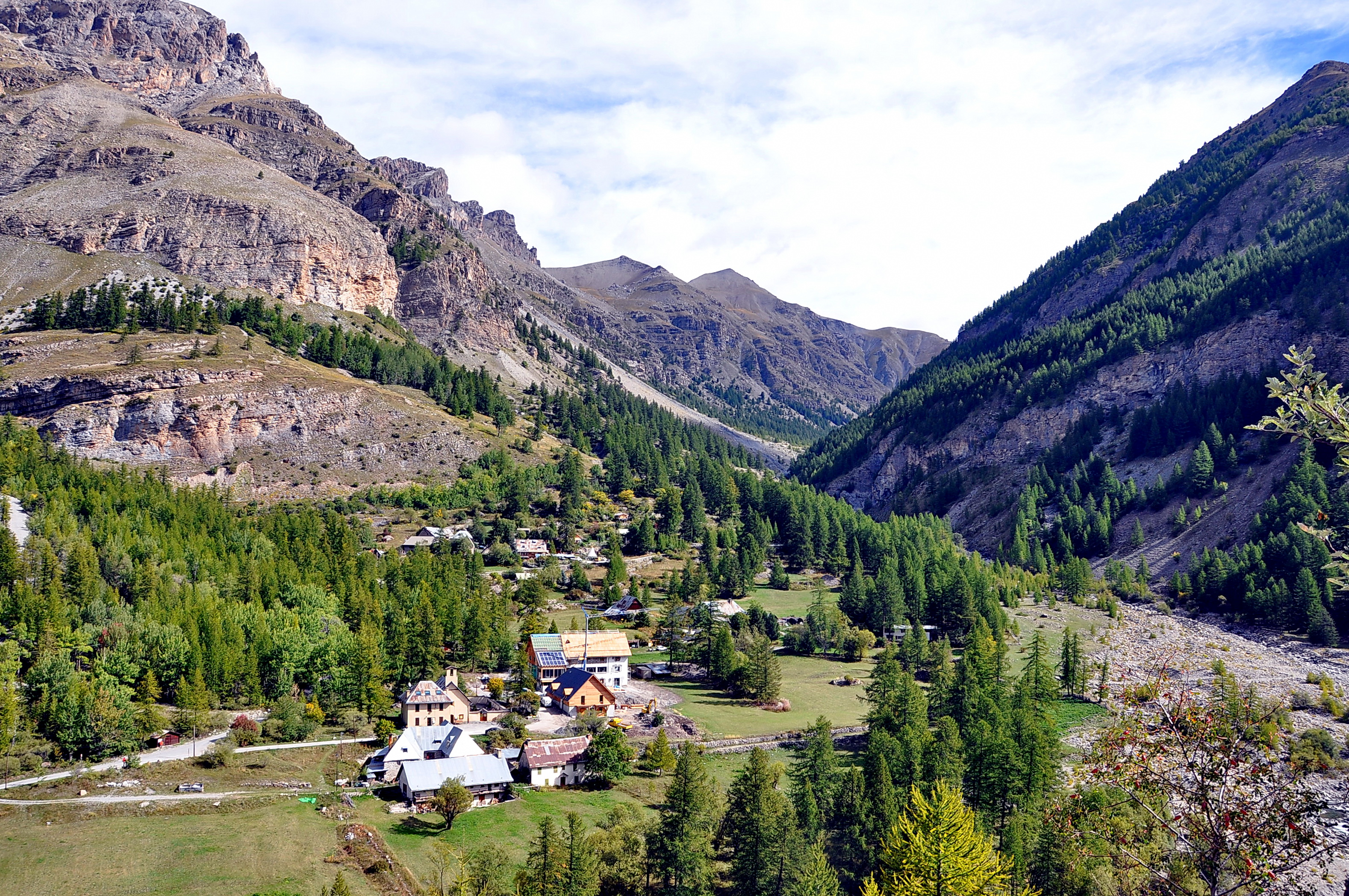
- The hamlet of Bayasse in the La Moutière valley

- Coat of arms
- Location of Uvernet-Fours
- Location within France Location within Provence-Alpes-Côte d'Azur
- Coordinates: 44°21′43″N 6°37′37″E
- Country: France
- Region: Provence-Alpes-Côte d'Azur
- Department: Alpes-de-Haute-Provence
- Arrondissement: Barcelonnette
- Canton: Barcelonnette
- Intercommunality: Vallée de l'Ubaye - Serre-Ponçon

Government
  - Mayor (2026–32): Sabine Daneri
- Area^{1}: 135.44 km^{2} (52.29 sq mi)
- Elevation: 1,180 m (3,870 ft)
- Highest elevation: 3,040 m (9,970 ft)
- Lowest elevation: 1,093 m (3,586 ft)
- Population (2023): 499
  - Density: 3.68/km^{2} (9.54/sq mi)
- Time zone: UTC+01:00 (CET)
  - Summer (DST): UTC+02:00 (CEST)
- INSEE/Postal code: 04226 /04400
- ^{1} French Land Register data, which excludes lakes, ponds, glaciers > 1 km^{2} (0.386 sq mi or 247 acres) and river estuaries.

Uvernet-Fours (Occitan: Uvernet e Forns) is a commune in the Alpes-de-Haute-Provence department, southeastern France.

== Population ==
Historical population
| Year | Pop. | ±% p.a. |
|---|---|---|
| 1968 | 253 | — |
| 1975 | 506 | +10.41% |
| 1982 | 526 | +0.56% |
| 1990 | 543 | +0.40% |
| 1999 | 614 | +1.37% |
| 2007 | 638 | +0.48% |
| 2012 | 586 | −1.69% |
| 2017 | 586 | +0.00% |
| 2023 | 499 | −2.64% |
Source: INSEE

== See also ==
- Communes of the Alpes-de-Haute-Provence department
