= Pontis, Alpes-de-Haute-Provence =

Pontis
- Commune
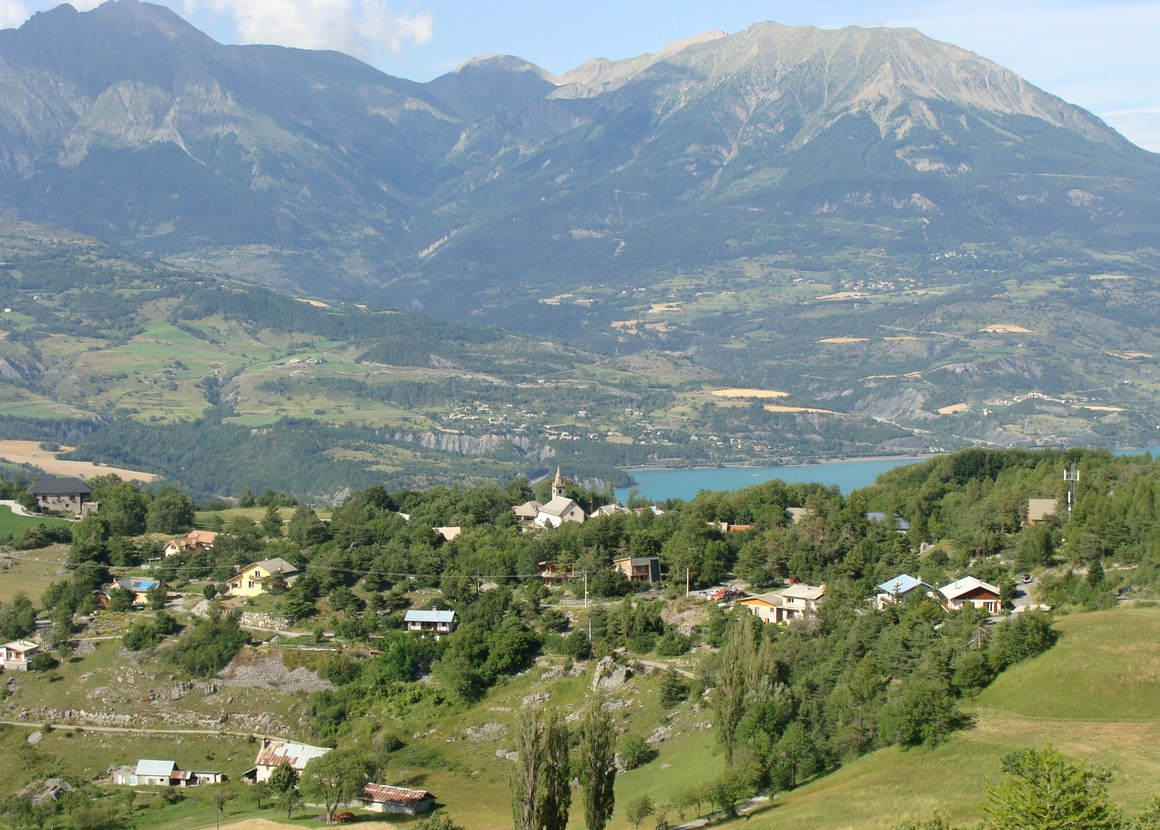
- The village of Pontis, seen from the col road

- Coat of arms
- Location of Pontis
- Location within France Location within Provence-Alpes-Côte d'Azur
- Coordinates: 44°30′18″N 6°21′31″E
- Country: France
- Region: Provence-Alpes-Côte d'Azur
- Department: Alpes-de-Haute-Provence
- Arrondissement: Barcelonnette
- Canton: Barcelonnette

Government
  - Mayor (2026–32): Georges Gambaudo
- Area^{1}: 14.11 km^{2} (5.45 sq mi)
- Highest elevation: 2,320 m (7,610 ft)
- Lowest elevation: 771 m (2,530 ft)
- Population (2023): 96
  - Density: 6.8/km^{2} (18/sq mi)
- Time zone: UTC+01:00 (CET)
  - Summer (DST): UTC+02:00 (CEST)
- INSEE/Postal code: 04154 /05160
- ^{1} French Land Register data, which excludes lakes, ponds, glaciers > 1 km^{2} (0.386 sq mi or 247 acres) and river estuaries.

Pontis is a commune in the Alpes-de-Haute-Provence department in southeastern France.

== Population ==
Historical population
Year	Pop.	±% p.a.
1968	64	—
1975	62	−0.45%
1982	63	+0.23%
1990	44	−4.39%
1999	45	+0.25%
2007	65	+4.70%
2012	78	+3.71%
2017	84	+1.49%
2023	96	+2.25%
Source: INSEE

== See also ==
- Communes of the Alpes-de-Haute-Provence department
