= Le Lauzet-Ubaye =

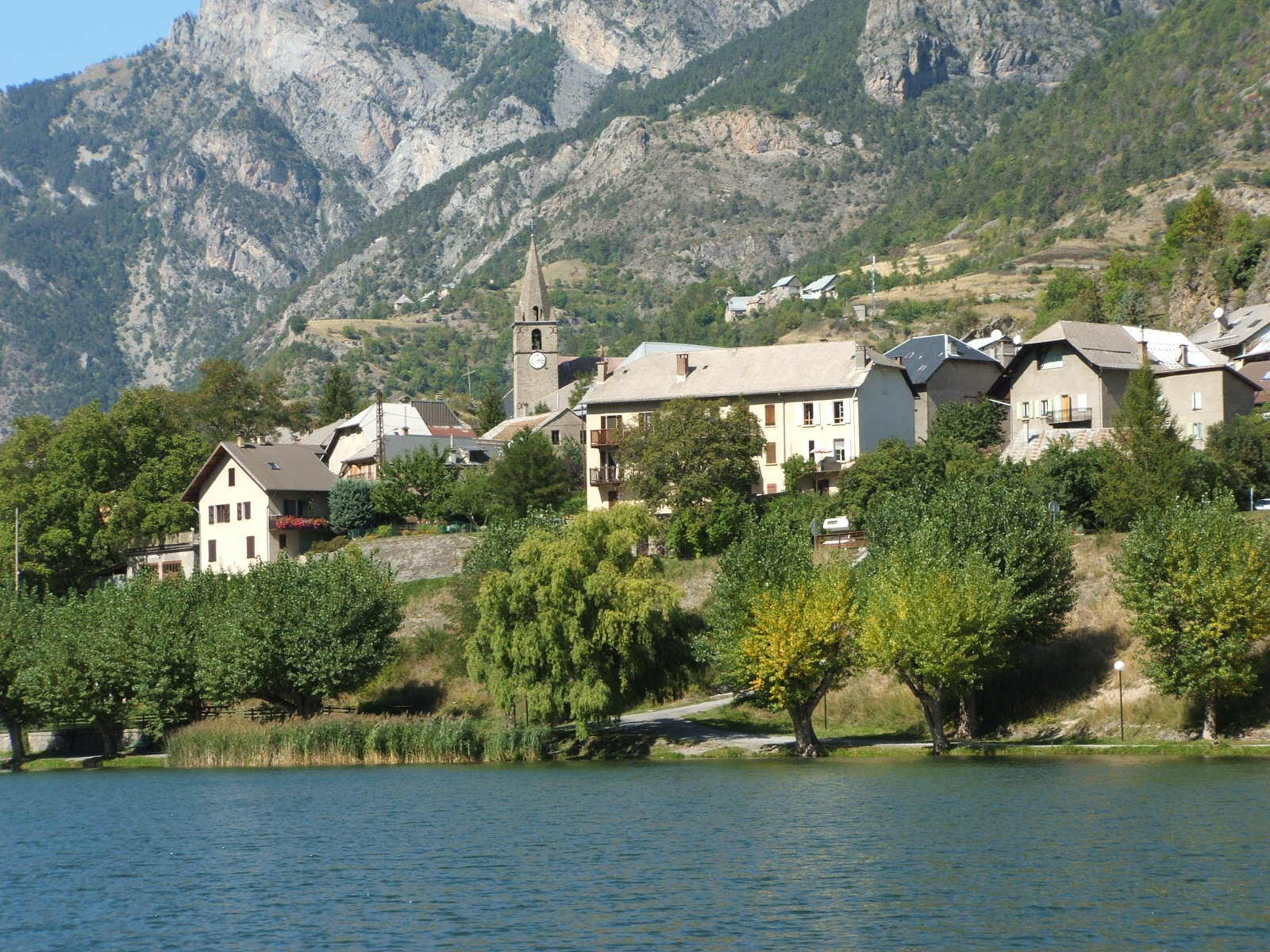
- Buildings of Le Lauzet-Ubaye and the lake

- Coat of arms
- Location of Le Lauzet-Ubaye
- Location within France Location within Provence-Alpes-Côte d'Azur
- Coordinates: 44°25′51″N 6°25′58″E
- Country: France
- Region: Provence-Alpes-Côte d'Azur
- Department: Alpes-de-Haute-Provence
- Arrondissement: Barcelonnette
- Canton: Barcelonnette
- Intercommunality: Vallée de l'Ubaye - Serre-Ponçon

Government
  - Mayor (2026–32): Agnès Pignatel
- Area^{1}: 66.26 km^{2} (25.58 sq mi)
- Elevation: 900 m (3,000 ft)
- Highest elevation: 2,500 m (8,200 ft)
- Lowest elevation: 771 m (2,530 ft)
- Population (2023): 229
  - Density: 3.46/km^{2} (8.95/sq mi)
- Time zone: UTC+01:00 (CET)
  - Summer (DST): UTC+02:00 (CEST)
- INSEE/Postal code: 04102 /04340
- ^{1} French Land Register data, which excludes lakes, ponds, glaciers > 1 km^{2} (0.386 sq mi or 247 acres) and river estuaries.

Le Lauzet-Ubaye is a commune in the Alpes-de-Haute-Provence department in southeastern France.

== Population ==
Historical population
Year	Pop.	±% p.a.
1968	253	—
1975	221	−1.91%
1982	241	+1.25%
1990	212	−1.59%
1999	203	−0.48%
2007	236	+1.90%
2012	226	−0.86%
2017	186	−3.82%
2023	229	+3.53%
Source: INSEE

== See also ==
- Ubaye Valley
- Communes of the Alpes-de-Haute-Provence department
