= Saint-Paul-sur-Ubaye =

- Commune
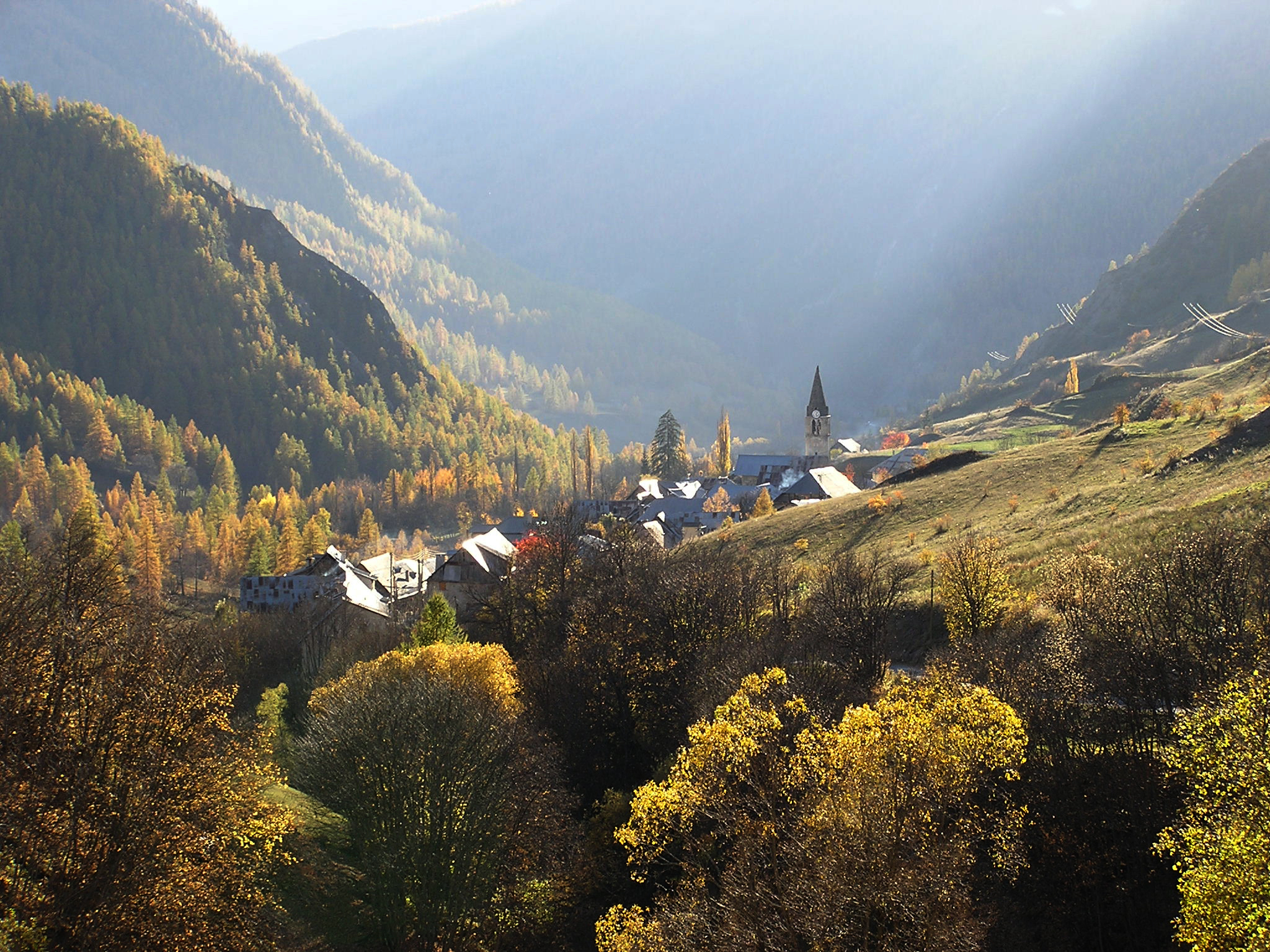
- A view of the hamlet of Grande Serenne, in the commune of Saint-Paul-sur-Ubaye
- Location of Saint-Paul-sur-Ubaye
- Location within France Location within Provence-Alpes-Côte d'Azur
- Coordinates: 44°30′57″N 6°45′08″E
- Country: France
- Region: Provence-Alpes-Côte d'Azur
- Department: Alpes-de-Haute-Provence
- Arrondissement: Barcelonnette
- Canton: Barcelonnette
- Intercommunality: Vallée de l'Ubaye - Serre-Ponçon

Government
  - Mayor (2026–32): Camille Colas
- Area^{1}: 205.55 km^{2} (79.36 sq mi)
- Population (2023): 215
  - Density: 1.05/km^{2} (2.71/sq mi)
- Time zone: UTC+01:00 (CET)
  - Summer (DST): UTC+02:00 (CEST)
- INSEE/Postal code: 04193 /04530
- ^{1} French Land Register data, which excludes lakes, ponds, glaciers > 1 km^{2} (0.386 sq mi or 247 acres) and river estuaries.

Saint-Paul-sur-Ubaye (French pronunciation: [sɛ̃ pɔl syʁ ybaj], lit. "Saint Paul-on-Ubaye"; Vivaro-Alpine: Sant Pau d'Ubaia, before 1998: Saint-Paul) is an alpine commune on the Italian border in the Alpes-de-Haute-Provence department in the Provence-Alpes-Côte d'Azur region in Southeastern France.

== Geography ==
With an area of 205.55 km^{2} (79.36 sq mi), the commune of Saint-Paul-sur-Ubaye is the largest commune in the Alpes-de-Haute-Provence department by surface area. It is located in the department's northeastern part, on the departmental border with Hautes-Alpes. The source of the Ubaye is in the commune.

=== Climate ===
St. Paul sur-Ubaye has a subarctic climate (Dfc)

Climate data for St Paul (1981–2010 averages, 1978–2018 extremes): elevation 1908m
Month	Jan	Feb	Mar	Apr	May	Jun	Jul	Aug	Sep	Oct	Nov	Dec	Year
Record high °C (°F)	13.2 (55.8)	14.6 (58.3)	18.4 (65.1)	22.6 (72.7)	25.0 (77.0)	27.2 (81.0)	29.1 (84.4)	30.0 (86.0)	28.6 (83.5)	24.8 (76.6)	19.2 (66.6)	11.9 (53.4)	30.0 (86.0)
Mean daily maximum °C (°F)	0.8 (33.4)	2.8 (37.0)	5.6 (42.1)	7.8 (46.0)	12.7 (54.9)	17.1 (62.8)	20.5 (68.9)	20.1 (68.2)	16.2 (61.2)	11.6 (52.9)	5.5 (41.9)	0.8 (33.4)	10.1 (50.2)
Daily mean °C (°F)	−4.1 (24.6)	−3.1 (26.4)	−0.1 (31.8)	2.5 (36.5)	6.9 (44.4)	10.4 (50.7)	13.2 (55.8)	12.9 (55.2)	9.5 (49.1)	5.6 (42.1)	0.5 (32.9)	−3.5 (25.7)	4.2 (39.6)
Mean daily minimum °C (°F)	−8.9 (16.0)	−9.0 (15.8)	−5.8 (21.6)	−2.8 (27.0)	1.1 (34.0)	3.7 (38.7)	5.8 (42.4)	5.7 (42.3)	2.8 (37.0)	−0.3 (31.5)	−4.4 (24.1)	−7.7 (18.1)	−1.6 (29.0)
Record low °C (°F)	−22.9 (−9.2)	−23.0 (−9.4)	−22.7 (−8.9)	−14.7 (5.5)	−11.6 (11.1)	−5.1 (22.8)	−2.3 (27.9)	−2.0 (28.4)	−6.7 (19.9)	−13.0 (8.6)	−20.2 (−4.4)	−23.0 (−9.4)	−23.0 (−9.4)
Average precipitation mm (inches)	57.3 (2.26)	45.1 (1.78)	57.7 (2.27)	83.0 (3.27)	89.0 (3.50)	93.3 (3.67)	69.0 (2.72)	75.4 (2.97)	90.8 (3.57)	111.0 (4.37)	79.3 (3.12)	72.0 (2.83)	922.9 (36.33)
Source: Meteociel

== Demographics ==
Historical population
Year	Pop.	±% p.a.
1968	232	—
1975	221	−0.69%
1982	208	−0.86%
1990	198	−0.61%
1999	190	−0.46%
2007	224	+2.08%
2012	214	−0.91%
2017	186	−2.77%
2023	215	+2.44%
Source: INSEE

== See also ==
- Ubaye Valley
- Communes of the Alpes-de-Haute-Provence department
