= Enchastrayes =

- Commune
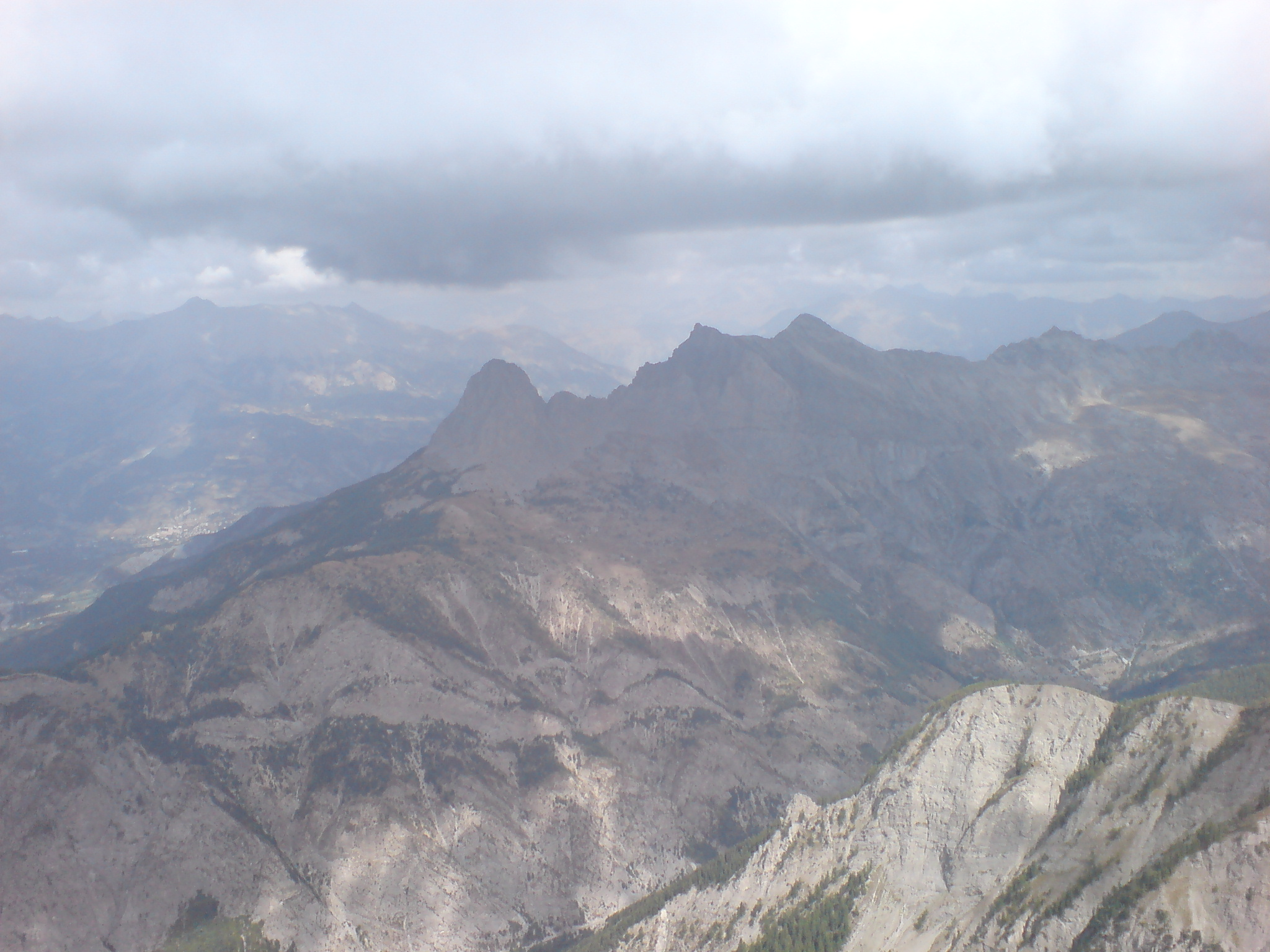
- The summit of the Chapeau de Gendarme (Gendarme Hat) south-west of Enchastrayes
- Location of Enchastrayes
- Location within France Location within Provence-Alpes-Côte d'Azur
- Coordinates: 44°22′06″N 6°41′45″E
- Country: France
- Region: Provence-Alpes-Côte d'Azur
- Department: Alpes-de-Haute-Provence
- Arrondissement: Barcelonnette
- Canton: Barcelonnette

Government
  - Mayor (2026–32): Isabelle Aubert-Pigeard
- Area^{1}: 44.19 km^{2} (17.06 sq mi)
- Elevation: 1,450 m (4,760 ft)
- Highest elevation: 2,775 m (9,104 ft)
- Lowest elevation: 1,151 m (3,776 ft)
- Population (2023): 399
  - Density: 9.03/km^{2} (23.4/sq mi)
- Time zone: UTC+01:00 (CET)
  - Summer (DST): UTC+02:00 (CEST)
- INSEE/Postal code: 04073 /04400
- ^{1} French Land Register data, which excludes lakes, ponds, glaciers > 1 km^{2} (0.386 sq mi or 247 acres) and river estuaries.

Enchastrayes (French pronunciation: [ɑ̃ʃastʁaj]; Occitan: Enchastraia) is a commune in the Alpes-de-Haute-Provence department in southeastern France.

The Enciastraia mountain is located in the communal territory, on the boundary with Piedmont, part of northern Italy.

== Population ==
Historical population
Year	Pop.	±% p.a.
1968	322	—
1975	365	+1.81%
1982	437	+2.61%
1990	474	+1.02%
1999	504	+0.68%
2007	429	−1.99%
2012	403	−1.24%
2017	396	−0.35%
2023	399	+0.13%
Source: INSEE

== See also ==
- Communes of the Alpes-de-Haute-Provence department
