= Canton of Barcelonnette =

Coordinates: 44°23′12″N 6°39′11″E

Barcelonnette
- Canton
- Interactive map of Barcelonnette
- Country: France
- Region: Provence-Alpes-Côte d'Azur
- Department: Alpes-de-Haute-Provence
- No. of communes: {{{nbcomm}}}
- Area: 1,027.73 km^{2} (396.81 sq mi)
- Population (2023): 7,737
  - Density: 7.528/km^{2} (19.50/sq mi)
- INSEE code: 04 01

The canton of Barcelonnette is an administrative division in southeastern France. At the French canton reorganisation which came into effect in March 2015, the canton was expanded from 11 to 16 communes (4 of which merged into the new communes Val-d'Oronaye and Ubaye-Serre-Ponçon):

1. Barcelonnette
2. La Condamine-Châtelard
3. Enchastrayes
4. Faucon-de-Barcelonnette
5. Jausiers
6. Le Lauzet-Ubaye
7. Méolans-Revel
8. Pontis
9. Saint-Paul-sur-Ubaye
10. Saint-Pons
11. Les Thuiles
12. Ubaye-Serre-Ponçon
13. Uvernet-Fours
14. Val-d'Oronaye

== Demographics ==
Historical population
Year	Pop.	±% p.a.
2013	8,044	—
2018	7,803	−0.61%
Source: INSEE

== See also ==
- Cantons of the Alpes-de-Haute-Provence department
- Communes of France
