= Jausiers =

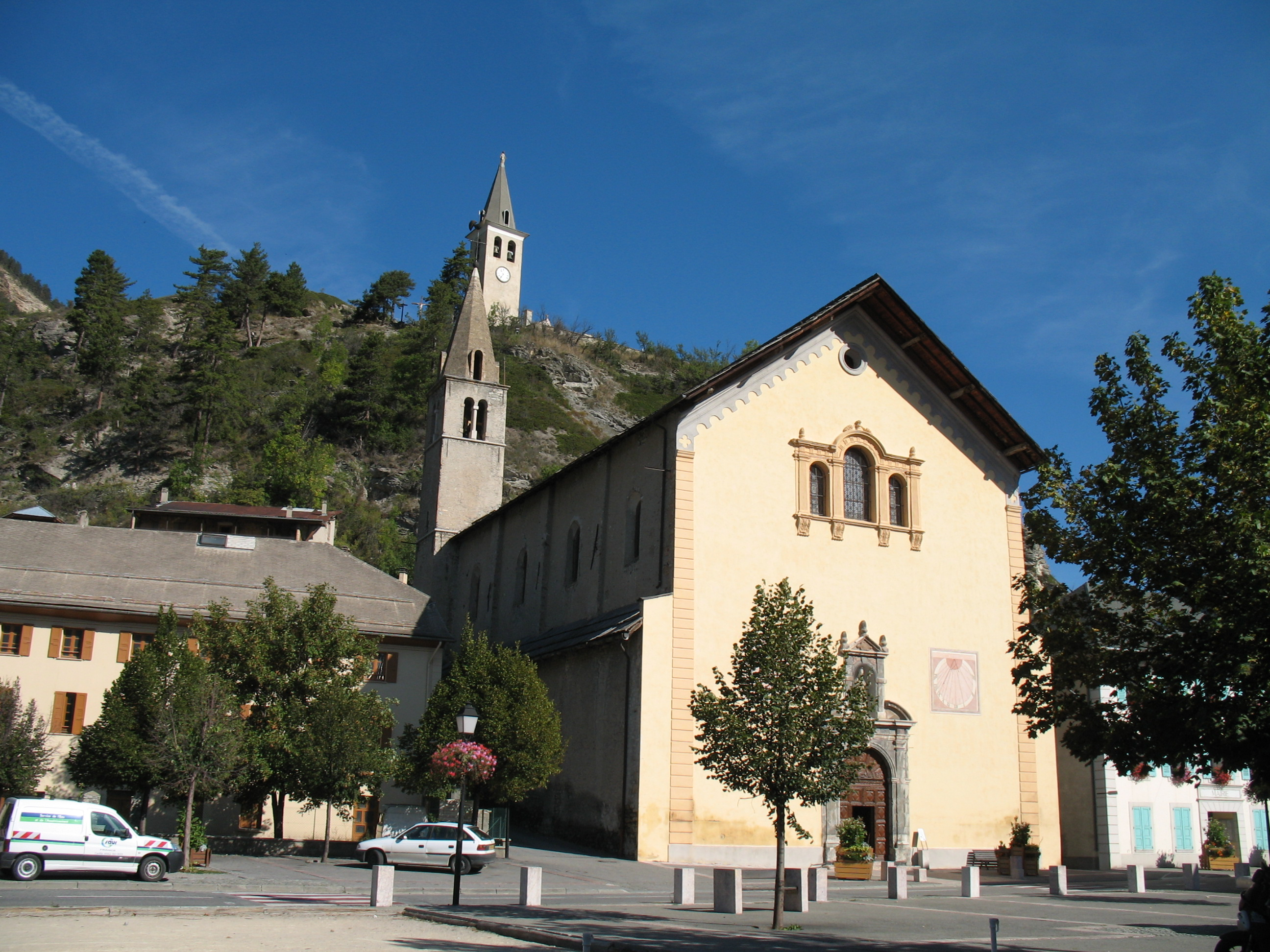
- The church of Saint-Nicolas de Myre, in Jausiers

- Coat of arms
- Location of Jausiers
- Location within France Location within Provence-Alpes-Côte d'Azur
- Coordinates: 44°25′07″N 6°43′53″E
- Country: France
- Region: Provence-Alpes-Côte d'Azur
- Department: Alpes-de-Haute-Provence
- Arrondissement: Barcelonnette
- Canton: Barcelonnette
- Intercommunality: Vallée de l'Ubaye Serre-Ponçon

Government
  - Mayor (2026–32): Sarah Zumtangwald
- Area^{1}: 107.73 km^{2} (41.59 sq mi)
- Elevation: 1,250 m (4,100 ft)
- Highest elevation: 3,027 m (9,931 ft)
- Lowest elevation: 1,195 m (3,921 ft)
- Population (2023): 1,146
  - Density: 10.64/km^{2} (27.55/sq mi)
- Time zone: UTC+01:00 (CET)
  - Summer (DST): UTC+02:00 (CEST)
- INSEE/Postal code: 04096 /04850
- ^{1} French Land Register data, which excludes lakes, ponds, glaciers > 1 km^{2} (0.386 sq mi or 247 acres) and river estuaries.

Jausiers (French pronunciation: [ʒozje]; Vivaro-Alpine: Jausièr) is a commune in the Alpes-de-Haute-Provence department in southeastern France.

== Politics and administration ==
List of Mayors of Jausiers
In office		Mayor	Party	Capacity
May 1945		Édouard Caire		
1980s		Jean-Laurent Cogordan		
March 1989	March 2008	Jean-Pierre Aubert	PS	Mayor of Barcelonnette (2008–2014)
March 2008	May 2020	Lucien Gilly	PS	General Councillor for the Canton of Barcelonnette (2004–2015)
May 2020	2026	Jacques Fortoul		Retired
2026	Incumbent	Sarah Zumtangwald		

== Population ==
Historical population
Year	Pop.	±% p.a.
1968	628	—
1975	681	+1.16%
1982	747	+1.33%
1990	860	+1.78%
1999	896	+0.46%
2007	1,040	+1.88%
2012	1,135	+1.76%
2017	1,130	−0.09%
2023	1,146	+0.23%
Source: INSEE

== Climate ==
Climate data for Jausiers-Saint Anne, 1240m (1991−2020 normals, extremes 1985−present)
Month	Jan	Feb	Mar	Apr	May	Jun	Jul	Aug	Sep	Oct	Nov	Dec	Year
Record high °C (°F)	17.0 (62.6)	20.0 (68.0)	24.0 (75.2)	27.2 (81.0)	31.0 (87.8)	37.0 (98.6)	37.5 (99.5)	37.6 (99.7)	33.5 (92.3)	28.9 (84.0)	20.0 (68.0)	17.5 (63.5)	37.6 (99.7)
Mean daily maximum °C (°F)	4.4 (39.9)	6.4 (43.5)	11.0 (51.8)	13.9 (57.0)	18.6 (65.5)	23.3 (73.9)	26.1 (79.0)	25.7 (78.3)	20.4 (68.7)	15.3 (59.5)	8.7 (47.7)	4.5 (40.1)	14.9 (58.7)
Daily mean °C (°F)	−0.9 (30.4)	0.2 (32.4)	4.1 (39.4)	7.2 (45.0)	11.4 (52.5)	15.4 (59.7)	17.7 (63.9)	17.4 (63.3)	13.2 (55.8)	9.0 (48.2)	3.5 (38.3)	−0.2 (31.6)	8.2 (46.7)
Mean daily minimum °C (°F)	−6.2 (20.8)	−6.1 (21.0)	−2.7 (27.1)	0.4 (32.7)	4.3 (39.7)	7.6 (45.7)	9.3 (48.7)	9.2 (48.6)	6.0 (42.8)	2.8 (37.0)	−1.7 (28.9)	−4.9 (23.2)	1.5 (34.7)
Record low °C (°F)	−22.0 (−7.6)	−24.0 (−11.2)	−18.0 (−0.4)	−11.0 (12.2)	−8.0 (17.6)	−4.5 (23.9)	−1.5 (29.3)	−0.5 (31.1)	−4.5 (23.9)	−10.0 (14.0)	−18.0 (−0.4)	−20.5 (−4.9)	−24.0 (−11.2)
Average precipitation mm (inches)	43.8 (1.72)	35.2 (1.39)	40.6 (1.60)	56.2 (2.21)	62.0 (2.44)	58.2 (2.29)	46.1 (1.81)	48.3 (1.90)	62.6 (2.46)	79.4 (3.13)	84.7 (3.33)	59.4 (2.34)	676.5 (26.62)
Average precipitation days (≥ 1.0 mm)	5.6	4.6	5.4	7.5	9.2	8.8	7.0	6.9	6.7	7.7	7.8	6.4	83.6
Source: Meteociel

== Landmarks ==
- Château des Magnans

== Notable Residents ==
- Jean-Baptiste Ebrard founder El Puerto de Liverpool, now a large department store across Mexico – born 1828, Jausiers; died January 4, 1892, Nice

== See also ==
- Ubaye Valley
- Communes of the Alpes-de-Haute-Provence department
