= Méolans-Revel =

- Commune
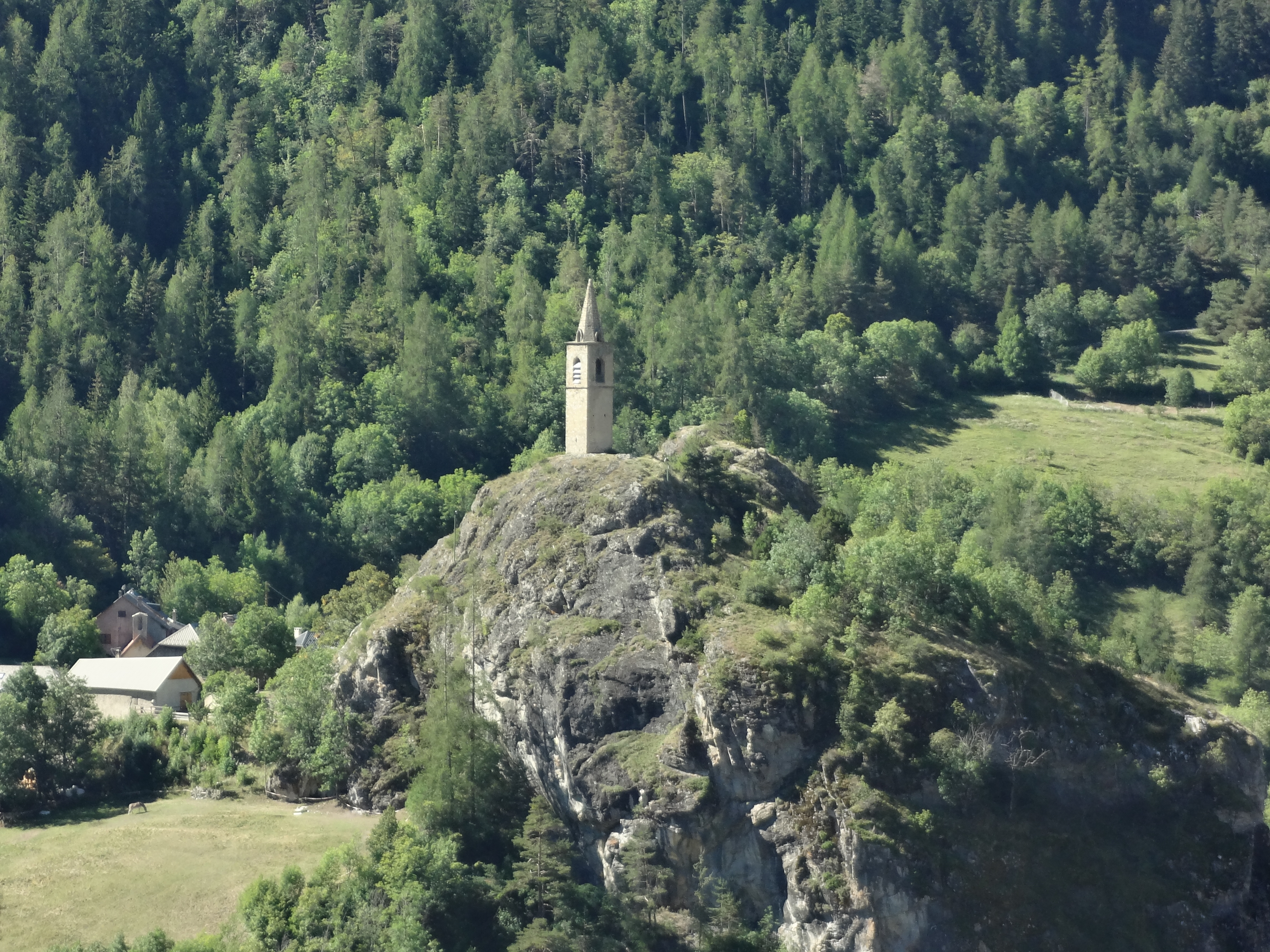
- The bell tower of the church of Saint-Julien, in Méolans-Revel
- Location of Méolans-Revel
- Location within France Location within Provence-Alpes-Côte d'Azur
- Coordinates: 44°24′08″N 6°30′44″E
- Country: France
- Region: Provence-Alpes-Côte d'Azur
- Department: Alpes-de-Haute-Provence
- Arrondissement: Barcelonnette
- Canton: Barcelonnette

Government
  - Mayor (2026–32): Sébastien Garnier
- Area^{1}: 127.74 km^{2} (49.32 sq mi)
- Elevation: 1,040 m (3,410 ft)
- Highest elevation: 2,928 m (9,606 ft)
- Lowest elevation: 912 m (2,992 ft)
- Population (2023): 321
  - Density: 2.51/km^{2} (6.51/sq mi)
- Time zone: UTC+01:00 (CET)
  - Summer (DST): UTC+02:00 (CEST)
- INSEE/Postal code: 04161 /04340
- ^{1} French Land Register data, which excludes lakes, ponds, glaciers > 1 km^{2} (0.386 sq mi or 247 acres) and river estuaries.

Méolans-Revel (French pronunciation: [meɔlɑ̃ ʁəvɛl]; Occitan: Meulans e Revèl) is a commune in the Alpes-de-Haute-Provence department in southeastern France.

== Population ==
Historical population
Year	Pop.	±% p.a.
1968	299	—
1975	230	−3.68%
1982	224	−0.38%
1990	227	+0.17%
1999	284	+2.52%
2007	328	+1.82%
2012	333	+0.30%
2017	339	+0.36%
2023	321	−0.91%
Source: INSEE

== Incidents ==
On the 24 March 2015, Germanwings Flight 9525 travelling from Barcelona to Düsseldorf crashed near Méolans-Revel.

== See also ==
- Ubaye Valley
- Communes of the Alpes-de-Haute-Provence department
