= Seyne =

- Commune
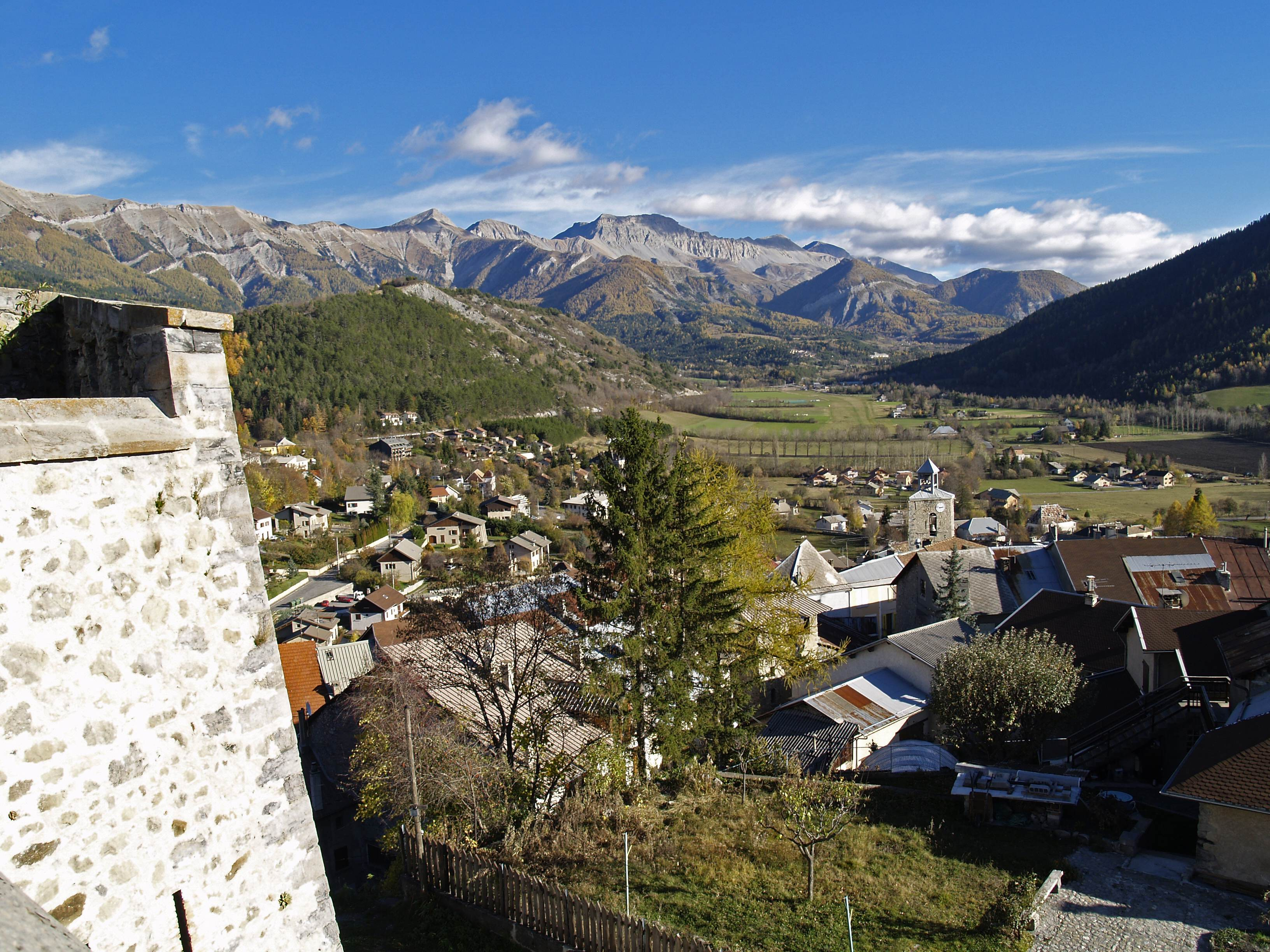
- A general view of the village of Seyne

- Coat of arms
- Location of Seyne
- Location within France Location within Provence-Alpes-Côte d'Azur
- Coordinates: 44°21′05″N 6°21′25″E
- Country: France
- Region: Provence-Alpes-Côte d'Azur
- Department: Alpes-de-Haute-Provence
- Arrondissement: Digne-les-Bains
- Canton: Seyne
- Intercommunality: CA Provence-Alpes

Government
  - Mayor (2026–32): Laurent Pascal
- Area^{1}: 84.27 km^{2} (32.54 sq mi)
- Elevation: 1,260 m (4,130 ft)
- Highest elevation: 2,720 m (8,920 ft)
- Lowest elevation: 1,079 m (3,540 ft)
- Population (2023): 1,379
  - Density: 16.36/km^{2} (42.38/sq mi)
- Time zone: UTC+01:00 (CET)
  - Summer (DST): UTC+02:00 (CEST)
- INSEE/Postal code: 04205 /04140
- ^{1} French Land Register data, which excludes lakes, ponds, glaciers > 1 km^{2} (0.386 sq mi or 247 acres) and river estuaries.

Seyne (French pronunciation: [sɛn]; Vivaro-Alpine: Sèina) is a commune in Alpes-de-Haute-Provence, a department of the Provence-Alpes-Côte d'Azur region in south-east France. It is roughly 30 km north of Digne.

The village's official name is listed under the INSEE Official Geographic Code as "Seyne". However it is known locally as "Seyne-les-Alpes", not to be confused with La Seyne-sur-Mer which is the second largest city in the Var.

The residents are traditionally referred to as "Seynois". In more recent years locals have been known to also go by "Seynard" (male) and "Seynarde" (female).

The Alpes-de-Haute-Provence tourism board listed Seyne-les-Alpes as one of their "villages and towns of character", an award given to places around the region with remarkable architecture and less than 2000 inhabitants.

== Geography ==
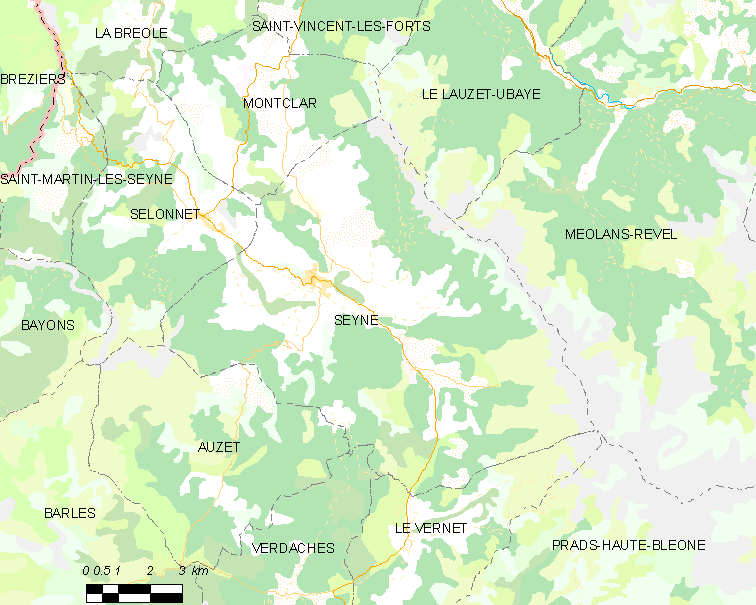
Seyne and surrounding communes

The village sits at an altitude of 1,260 metres (4,130 ft). The Seyne Valley, known for its rich soil, is nicknamed the Swiss Provençal.

The only river to run through the village is the Blanche, a tributary of the Durance.

The local area is made up of 2,800 hectares (6,900 acres) of woodland and forests.

=== Communication and transport ===
Seyne is situated on the D900 road, between the neighbouring communes of Le Vernet and Selonnet. The road runs from Digne in the south, all the way to the Maddalena Pass on the Italian-French border. The nearest SNCF railway station is the Gare de Digne.

=== Climate ===
Climate data for Seyne-Col Maure, 1347m (1981−2010 normals, extremes 1998−2009)
Month	Jan	Feb	Mar	Apr	May	Jun	Jul	Aug	Sep	Oct	Nov	Dec	Year
Record high °C (°F)	16.0 (60.8)	16.5 (61.7)	20.0 (68.0)	21.5 (70.7)	27.8 (82.0)	31.0 (87.8)	31.0 (87.8)	32.4 (90.3)	30.1 (86.2)	23.5 (74.3)	17.7 (63.9)	15.6 (60.1)	32.4 (90.3)
Mean daily maximum °C (°F)	4.5 (40.1)	5.9 (42.6)	9.3 (48.7)	12.1 (53.8)	17.3 (63.1)	22.1 (71.8)	24.6 (76.3)	24.2 (75.6)	19.3 (66.7)	14.9 (58.8)	8.0 (46.4)	4.5 (40.1)	13.9 (57.0)
Daily mean °C (°F)	−1.3 (29.7)	−0.4 (31.3)	3.1 (37.6)	5.9 (42.6)	10.7 (51.3)	14.5 (58.1)	16.4 (61.5)	16.4 (61.5)	12.4 (54.3)	8.9 (48.0)	2.9 (37.2)	−0.5 (31.1)	7.4 (45.4)
Mean daily minimum °C (°F)	−7.0 (19.4)	−6.8 (19.8)	−3.1 (26.4)	−0.2 (31.6)	4.0 (39.2)	6.9 (44.4)	8.2 (46.8)	8.5 (47.3)	5.5 (41.9)	2.8 (37.0)	−2.2 (28.0)	−5.5 (22.1)	0.9 (33.7)
Record low °C (°F)	−20.5 (−4.9)	−23.5 (−10.3)	−18.0 (−0.4)	−11.2 (11.8)	−4.0 (24.8)	−4.2 (24.4)	−0.5 (31.1)	1.0 (33.8)	−3.5 (25.7)	−8.7 (16.3)	−17.4 (0.7)	−20.0 (−4.0)	−23.5 (−10.3)
Average precipitation mm (inches)	65.2 (2.57)	42.1 (1.66)	72.1 (2.84)	100.0 (3.94)	102.5 (4.04)	74.4 (2.93)	61.2 (2.41)	82.5 (3.25)	105.1 (4.14)	121.4 (4.78)	108.4 (4.27)	83.8 (3.30)	1,018.7 (40.13)
Average precipitation days (≥ 1.0 mm)	7.4	5.3	7.9	11.2	11.7	8.3	6.8	8.9	8.3	9.5	8.5	7.8	101.6
Source: Meteociel

== Toponymy ==
The name of the village, as it appeared for the first time in 1147 (in Sedena), is thought to refer to the Gallic tribe of the Adanates, or to be built on the root *Sed-, for rock, according to Charles Rostaing. According to Bénédicte and Jean-Jacques Fénie, the name comes from a Pre-Celtic root oronym (mountain toponym), *Sed-. The municipality is named Sanha in the Vivaro-Alpine dialect and Provençal dialect of the classical norm, and Sagno in the Mistralian norm.

== History ==
=== Antiquity ===
Before the Roman conquest, Seyne was the capital of the Adanates. It held the status of civitas under the Roman Empire.

=== Middle Ages ===
The first counts appeared in the area with the advent of c.950 of Boson, son of Rothbald. His grand-daughter later married the count of Toulose, the beginning of lengthy ties between the two cities. Seyne appeared in charters in 1146 ('in Sedena')

Ramon Berenguer IV of Barcelona forced the submission of Provençal barons who had revolted in the Baussenque Wars. After taking control of Arles, he summoned the lords of Haute-Provence to Seyne to renew their fealty. The Counts of Provence endowed the consulate as early as 1223 (1220 according to legal historian André Gouron), which served as a model to other consulates. Around the 1220s, a large tower was built to defend the city, which was then called Seyne-la-Grande-Tour. A regional council took place in 1267. The Saint-Jacques Hospital was founded in 1293, followed at the end of the 15th century by the Hôtel-Dieu.

The death of Joanna I of Naples opened a succession crisis at the head of the Comté de Provence. The towns of the Union of Aix (1382-1387) supported Charles, Duke of Durazzo against Louis I, Duke of Anjou. The community supported the Durazzo side until 18 September 1385, then changed camp and joined the Angevins through the patient negotiations of Marie de Blois, Louis I's widow and regent of their son Louis II. The surrender of Seyne involved the communities of Couloubrous and Beauvillars.

The fair held in Seyne in the late Middle Ages benefitted from its crossroads location, and continued until the end of the Ancien Regime. Seyne was a baillie which subsequently became a seneschal headquarters: It included the communities of Auzet, Barles, La Bréole, Montclar, Pontis, Selonnet, Saint-Martin-lès-Seyne, Saint-Vincent, Ubaye, Verdaches, Le Vernet.

The community of Beauvillars, which had 88 feus at the enumeration of 1316, depended administratively upon Seyne. In the 15th century, the inhabitants of Beauvillars, who had wanted to secede, were massacred, the survivors were deported, and the name of Beauvillars was erased from the archives.

The community of Couloubrous (Colobrosium, cited in the 13th century), was also attached to 15th century Seyne. There were 19 feus in 1316, and it also had a consulate.

=== Early modern (1483-1789) ===
In the middle of the 16th century, Protestantism took root in Seyne. Through the Edict of Amboise (1563), adherents of this religion were allowed to build a place of worship, but outside the municipality.

The town was captured and looted by Protestant captain Paulon de Mauvans in the summer of 1560, during the Wars of Religion. The town was again attacked by Protestants in 1574, who this time held it thereafter. The Baron of Germany hid here in 1585, before the offensive of the Catholic League, without preventing the capture of the city by the Duke of Épernon. During the siege, the bell tower was destroyed.

At the end of the Wars of Religion, the Duke of Lesdiguières established a camp where he prepared his campaign to take Provence back from the Catholic Leaguers.

The Protestant Reformation had despite this fighting some success in Seyne, and some of the town's inhabitants remained Protestant. The Protestant community remained into the 17th century around their church, through the Edict of Nantes (1598). However, the Edict of Fontainebleau abolished the provisions of the edict of Nantes in 1688. It was fatal to the Protestant community, which disappeared, its people either emigrating or converted by force.

In 1656, the two hospitals (Hôtel-Dieu and hospital Saint-Jacques) merged into a single institution and moved to a shared building in 1734.

In 1690, the Marquis de Parelle led the Piedmontaise army of 5,000 men down from the Ubaye Valley and besieged Seyne. The city was forced to negotiate since the medieval enclosure was insufficient to ensure its defence, and a ransom was set at 11,000 livres. However, the militia of Provence and the regiment of Alsace succeeded in driving them back. On 24 December, funds were found and new bastions were built by Niquet. The new wall completed in August 1691 left the great tower outside of the city, but reinforced.

After a more serious alert in 1692, the entire Alpine border was reconsidered by Sebastien Vauban. In December 1692, he asked for the construction of a citadel including the great tower. Richerand led the work from 1693 to 1699. Although not satisfied during his inspection tour in 1700, Vauban failed to modify the fortifications, in part by building redoubts of setbacks in the north. The annexation of Ubaye by the Treaty of Utrecht removed the threat sufficiently for the work to be deferred indefinitely, (except for repairs to the walls in 1786).

The city was occupied in this condition by the Austro-Sardes in 1748 during the War of the Austrian Succession and again in 1815, at the end of the Napoleonic Wars. The city was almost undefended at the end of the Ancien Régime, with nine guns served by a garrison of three invalids, and an arsenal of 93 guns.

The city was the seat of a viguerie until the French Revolution and an office of the Poste Royale at the end of the Ancien Régime.

=== French Revolution ===
Just before the French Revolution, unrest mounted. Several years of fiscal problems preceded a bad harvest in 1788 and a very cold winter of 1788-89. The election of the Estates-General of 1789 was prepared by elections for States of Provence in 1788 and in January 1789, which highlighted the political oppositions of class and caused some agitation. At the end of March, as the cahiers de doléances were drawn up, a wave of insurrection shook Provence. A wheat riot occurred in Seyne on 29 March. Peasants gathered, protesting with shouts and threatens against the wealthy. However, the riot went no further, and did not cause any changes, unlike others in the region.

At first, reaction consisted in gathering the Maréchaussée staff. Then lawsuits were commissioned by the Parlement of Aix-en-Provence, but sentences were not carried out because of the storming of the Bastille and the Great Fear. In appeasement, an amnesty was announced in early August.

The fall of the Bastille was welcomed and thought to presage the end of arbitrary use of royal power, and perhaps profound changes. The advent of the new regime triggered a great phenomenon of collective fear that seized France, fear of an aristocrats conspiring to recover their privileges.

Rumours of armed soldiers devastating everything in their path spread rapidly, accompanied by gunfire, violence against nobles, and the organization of militias. The Great Fear came from Tallard, and awareness of the fear of the Mâconnais reached Seyne on the evening of 31 July 1789. The consuls of Turriers and Bellaffaire, warned by those at Gap that a troop of 5-6,000 brigands was headed to Haute-Provence after plundering the Dauphiné, sent word to the consuls of Seyne, who sent word to Sisteron and Digne, thereby spreading the Great Fear. They also warned all parishes within the purview of the viguerie of Seyne, and sent messengers to Gap and Embrun to ask for news. The arsenal of the citadel was requisitioned, and 93 guns and nine cannons were distributed in Seyne and the villages of Saint-Pons, Selonnet and Chardavon. Men took refuge with their furniture and livestock away from the walls of the citadel.

That night, messengers from Rochebrune and La Motte confirmed the news, and added that Romans-sur-Isère had been sacked. From the south, disquieting news arrived of the occupation of Castellane by 4,000 Barbets and the advance of 1,000 Piedmont soldiers in the Durance Valley. On 2 August, the panic declined, as the facts became clearer. However, a significant change took place. All communities Department were to be armed, organized to defend themselves and to defend their neighbours. A sense of solidarity was born within communities and between neighbouring communities, and the consuls usually decided to maintain the National Guard on foot. As soon as the fear had settled, the authorities disarmed workers and landless peasants, and kept only landowners and business owners in the National Guard.

The patriotic society of the municipality was created in the summer of 1792.

=== 19th century ===
Seyne saw some industrialization in the 19th century with the development of textile industries.

As with many municipalities in this department, Seyne had schools well before the Jules Ferry laws. In 1863, it had five, one in the town proper and also in the villages of Pompiery, Bas-Chardavon, Pons and Couloubroux. These schools provided primary education for boys. In the main town, a school for girls was mandated by the Falloux Laws of 1851. The commune took advantage of subsidies from the second Duruy Law (1877) to rebuild or renovate its schools. Only the Bas-Chardavon school was not addressed.

== Politics and administration ==
=== List of mayors ===
List of successive mayors
Start	End	Name	Party	Other details
May 1945		Yves Ramus		
1977	1989	Guy Derbez	UDF	
March 1989	2008	Francis Hermitte	PS	Ineligible for re-election in 2008
March 2008	2014	André Salloum	UMP	
April 2014	2020	Francis Hermitte	PS	Doctor
2020	incumbent	Laurent Pascal		

=== Environmental policy ===
Seyne is classified as a flower in the towns and villages floral competition.

=== Administration ===
A brigade of the National Gendarmerie is located in the town center of Seyne.

== Population and society ==
=== Demography ===
==== Demographic evolution ====
Historical population

Year	Pop.	±% p.a.
1249	182 feus	—
1263	200 feus	—
1315	320 feus	—
1471	182 feus	—
1765	2,556	—
1793	2,557	+0.00%
1800	2,557	+0.00%
1806	2,720	+1.04%
1821	2,952	+0.55%
1831	2,795	−0.55%
1836	2,881	+0.61%
1841	2,894	+0.09%
1846	3,069	+1.18%
1851	2,686	−2.63%

Year	Pop.	±% p.a.
1856	2,485	−1.54%
1861	2,508	+0.18%
1866	2,511	+0.02%
1872	2,312	−1.37%
1876	2,241	−0.78%
1881	2,162	−0.72%
1886	2,195	+0.30%
1891	1,902	−2.82%
1896	1,786	−1.25%
1901	1,715	−0.81%
1906	1,718	+0.03%
1911	1,620	−1.17%
1921	1,360	−1.73%
1926	1,255	−1.59%

Year	Pop.	±% p.a.
1931	1,205	−0.81%
1936	1,204	−0.02%
1946	1,173	−0.26%
1954	1,148	−0.27%
1962	1,183	+0.38%
1968	1,222	+0.54%
1975	1,214	−0.09%
1982	1,287	+0.84%
1990	1,222	−0.65%
1999	1,441	+1.85%
2007	1,427	−0.12%
2012	1,419	−0.11%
2017	1,362	−0.82%
2023	1,379	+0.21%

Source: Baratier, Duby & Hildesheimer for the Ancien Régime; EHESS; INSEE from 1968

The demographic history of Seyne, after the population losses of the 14th and 15th centuries, and the long period of growth until the beginning of the 19th century, was marked by a period of 'spread' where the population remained relatively stable at a high level. This period lasted from 1821 to 1861. The rural exodus then caused a trend of long-term demographic decline. By 1921, the town had lost more than half its population from its maximum in 1846. The drop continued until the 1970s. Since then, population growth has resumed but without returning to the level of 1911.

==== Age pyramid ====
The population of the commune is relatively old. The proportion of people over 60 (34.1%) is higher than in France as a whole (21.6%) and the department (27.3%). Like national and departmental allocations, the female population of the commune is greater than the male population. The rate (52.2%) is of a similar order of magnitude as the national rate (51.6%).

The distribution of the population of the commune by age is, in 2007, as follows:

- 47.8% of men (0–14 years = 18.4%, 15–29 years = 12.1%, 30-44 year olds = 17.1%, 45–59 years = 20.1%, more than 60 years = 32.3%)
- 52.2% of women (0–14 years = 15.7%, 15–29 years = 10.5%, 30-44 year olds = 17.2%, 45–59 years = 20.8%, more than 60 years = 35.8%)

=== Education ===
The municipality has three educational institutions:

- Two schools; a primary school and a kindergarten.
- The Collège Marcel-André (middle school).

=== Health ===
A hospital is located in the municipality.

== Economy ==
The economy of Seyne revolves around sports activities and tourism.

=== Industry ===
Alp'entreprise, active in the building and public works (BTP) sector, has 15 employees.

=== Tourism ===
The commune has an Alpine skiing ski station at Le Grand Puy and a Nordic skiing station at Col du Fanget. Formerly, the town had one or two ski lifts to Col Saint-Jean. In 2024, the commune voted to close the Grand Puy ski facilities effective 1 November because there was no longer adequate snow. The lifts will be dismantled and other forms of tourism are under consideration.

GR footpath 6, connecting Sainte-Foy to Saint-Paul-sur-Ubaye, passes through Seyne.

== Local culture and heritage ==
=== Sites and monuments ===
==== Fortifications ====
Medieval fortifications remain:

- The fortified gate of the Rue Basse, from the 14th century.
- The Tour Maubert, or great tower, a three-storey tower built outside the walls in the 12th century. This was built as a rectangle 12 metres (39 ft) high connected to the town. It has been reviewed as under restoration.

The rest of the city wall enclosure in fact consisted of the walls of houses, built continuously, without openings to the outside.

In 1690-1691, the engineer Niquet began construction of a new, much larger enclosure with nine bastion towers, of which six survive. These towers had two levels, the lower a pentagonal, a design innovation of Niquet. The construction was reviewed by Vauban, who requested the addition of a citadel during his visit in 1692. The citadel of Seyne was built by Guy Creuzet de Richerand, beginning in 1693, and completed in 1700. This citadel, too narrow, known as Vauban but which did not satisfy him during his inspection trip, dominates the Blanche Valley, 200 metres (660 ft) long by 50 metres (160 ft) wide. It incorporates an old tower modified to accommodate artillery, is equipped with a barracks, and entry was barred, on the town side, by a tenaille. The wall was completed in 1705.

The stronghold, at the front line at the time of its construction, was found in the third line after the Treaty of Utrecht (1713), which reunited the Ubaye Valley with France, was defended by two invalid companies to the Revolution, and a reduced garrison during the period between 1790-1815. The restoration added an advanced battery or hornwork, a rebuilt door (1821), and some casemates for rear firing and caponiers. It was decommissioned in 1866, then occupied by a single guard from 1887 to 1907, when it was sold. Passed from hand to hand, the commune bought it in 1977, and has since begun restoration work. The enclosure is a listed historic monument.

==== Civil architecture ====
Several houses on the streets of the old center date from the 17th century, including the old town hall on the main street and a house nearby from 1788, with an arched gate. Another house on the high street dates from 1605. A further house on the high street dates from 1708 and, nearby, one more dates from the end of the Middle Ages, with an overhang supported by corbels of wood mouldings. Other houses on the high street, retained in front of the arches, have characteristic medieval elements. However, these date to the 18th century.

The hospital was built in 1734. A carved bench, leather seat, and a five foot long table of beech from the 17th and the 18th centuries, currently kept at the town hall, originally came from the hospital. These items are classified as historic monument objects.

Several farms in the commune are fortified.

==== The Church of Our Lady of Nazareth ====
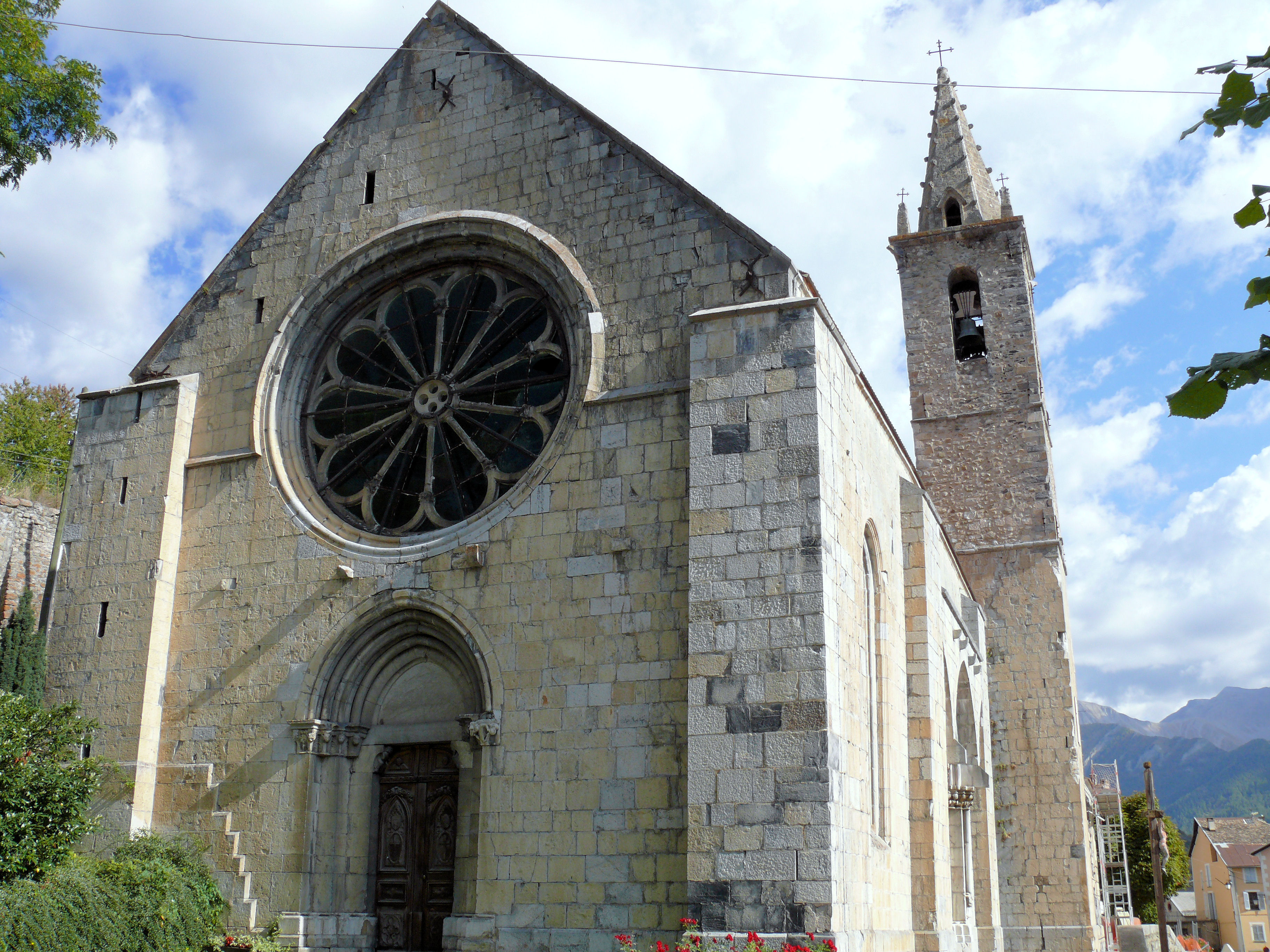
Facade of the rose window at the Church of Our Lady of Nazareth

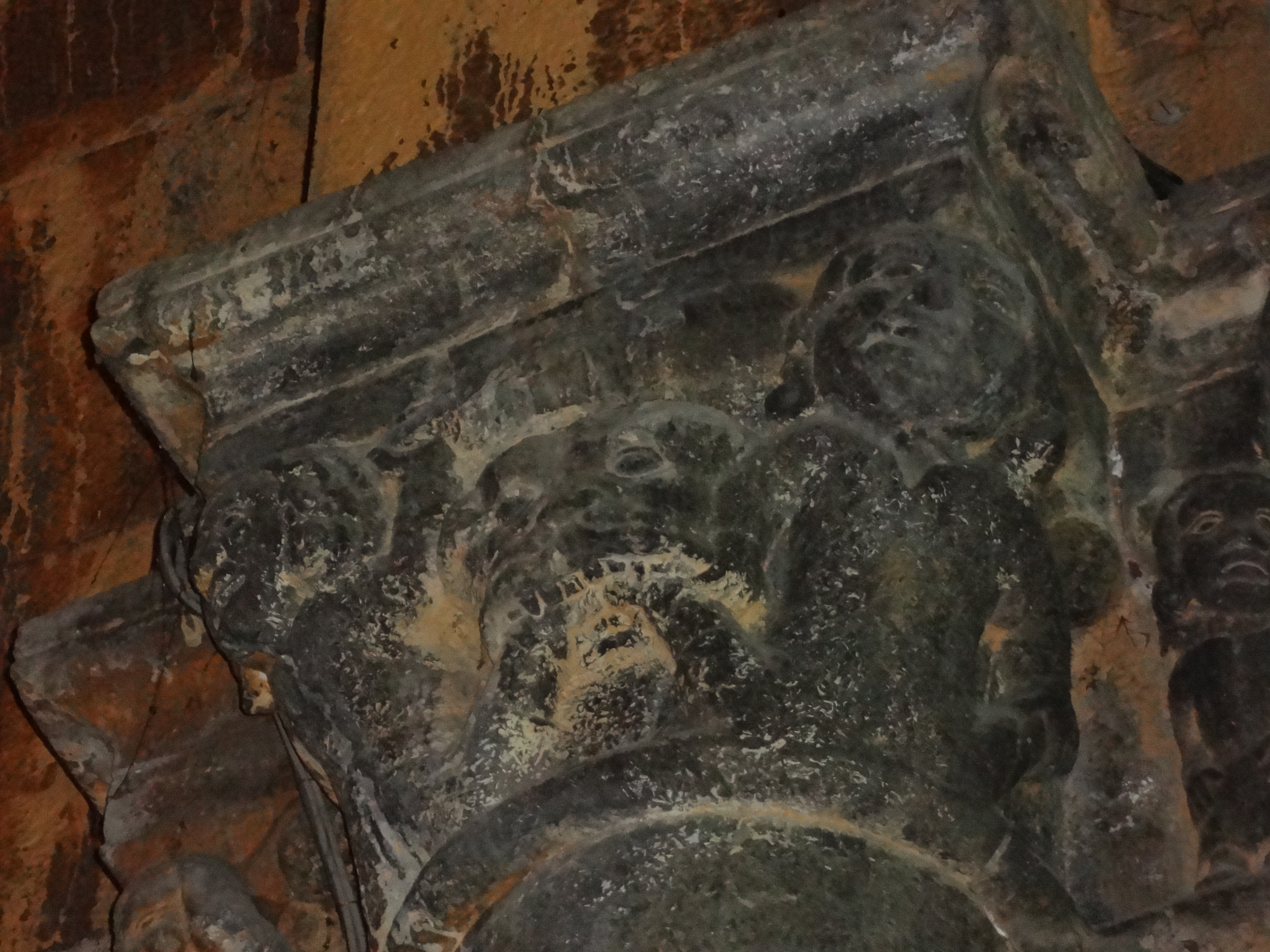
Nave architecture inside the Church of Our Lady of Nazareth

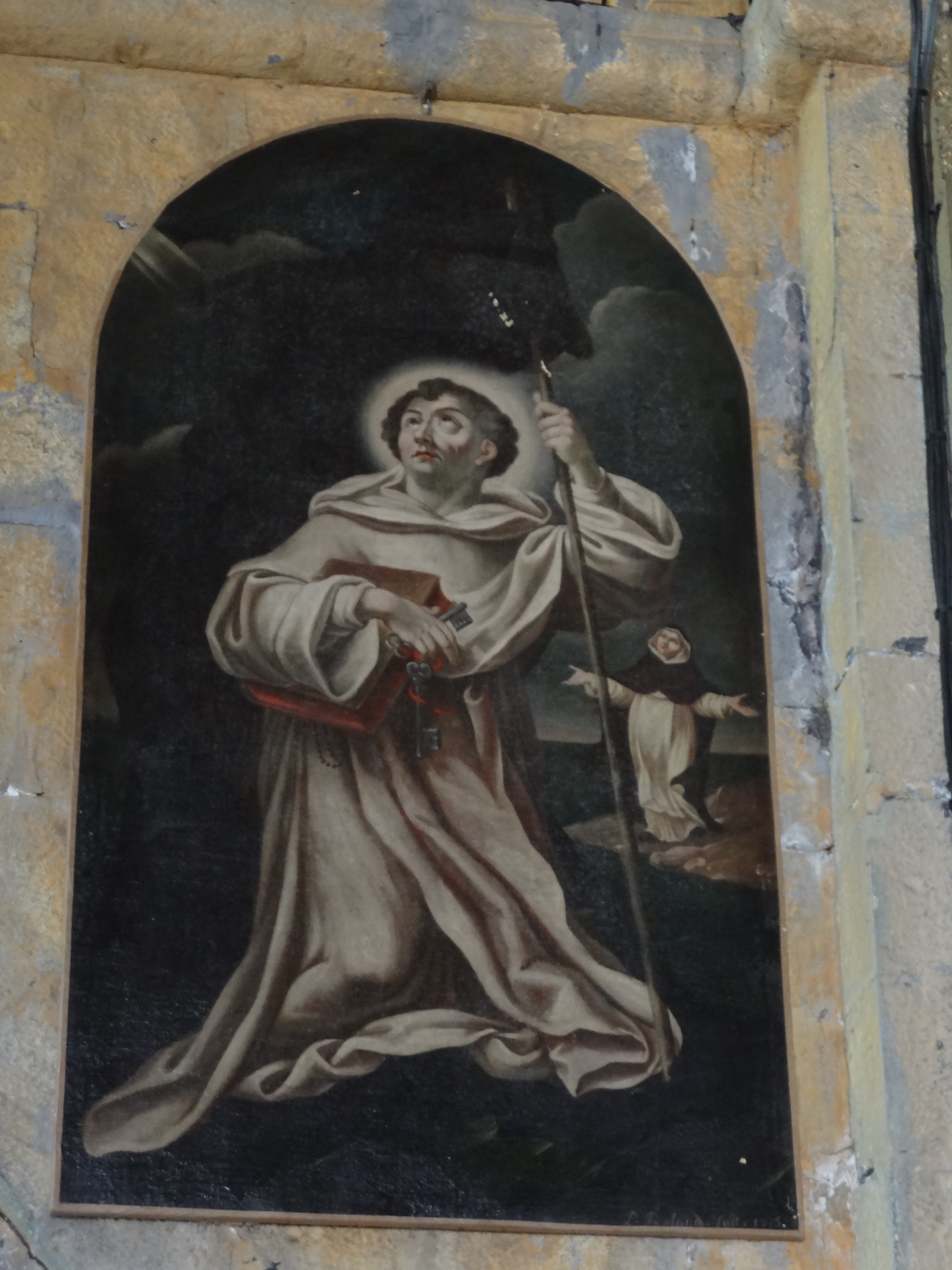
Saint in ecstasy (1713)

The Church of Our Lady of Nazareth (Notre-Dame-de-Nazareth), built in Romanesque style, has completely retained its initial appearance. Legendarily attributed to Charlemagne, in fact construction of the present building can be traced back to the middle of the 12th century. The western façade is decorated with a large rose window with twelve rays and a sundial, composed on a marble slab, dating from 1878. The old porch has disappeared. Its arched portal has retained its carved capitals.

The nave, 8.5 metres (28 ft) long and 14.5 metres (48 ft) high, has three arched barrel bays, and is separated with a double-roll of a double-arch. The chancel has a flat chevet and is also barrel-vaulted. In front of the choir, two side chapels form a false transept. The portal of the south façade is Gothic, from the 13th or 14th century, notable for being framed by two separations of arches which rely on the surrounding buttresses.

The gate leaves date to 1631.

The church spire was rebuilt after the siege of the Duke of Épernon. Some renovation work (repointing, restoration of the southwestern buttresses) was done in 1967.

The capitals have carved human faces and characters with bodies twisted by torments that devils impose upon them. The baptismal fonts are 4 metres (13 ft) in diameter. The church has been a classified historic monument since 1862.

The Holy Family altarpiece was painted directly onto the panel of the retable, in archaic style, during the 17th century. The wooden pulpit, carved and decorated, dates to the turn of the 17th and 18th centuries and is also a listed object.

The furnishings of the church include:

- Several processional crosses, one of silver decorated with Champlevé enamels, (listed, 16th century)
- A wood carving in high relief of Mary Magdalene, gilt, (18th century, listed)
- The altar and the tabernacle of the Dominican convent, gilded wood, 17th century, listed)
- An image of the Holy Family (16th century, listed)
- A marble font by Maurin (17th century, classified)
- A tabernacle placed under a baldachin at six feet, from the convent of the Trinitarian Order (16th century, listed)

Finally, the priest has full vestments (chasuble, dalmatic, clevis, veil covering the chalice, purse, stole, maniple), satin brocade, with colourful ornaments, and an undecorated cross of a landscape, from the 18th century. This set is unique in the department, and is also listed as an historic object.

==== Dominican Church ====
The Church of the Dominican Order, of classic style, has a relatively complex layout. In a nave with six bays, each wide span is followed by a narrow span, all flattened and barrel-vaulted. The narrow spans are filled with an oeil-de-boeuf, while the wide aisles are square bays.

Six reliquary busts, from the 17th century, are still archaic style and are listed as historic objects. The church is decorated with a Crucifixion of Jesus from the 17th century, in which Christ is surrounded by all the instruments of the Passion, two penitents and two angels, and is also a listed object. The convent, which forms part of the church, was built in 1683 and is a registered monument. The sacramental veil in the church is golden embroidered silk (67 cm by 71 cm). It represents two angels in prayer on either side of an altar on which a silver lamb has been sacrificed. This veil has been a listed object since 1908.

==== Chapels ====
The town has many surviving chapels:

- Chapel of the Penitents, with a three-sided steeple, 17th–18th century.
- The chapel of Saint-Pons, in Saint-Pons, from the beginning of the 17th century, with a nave of five bays and a Gothic bell tower from 1437). Its furnishings include a silver chalice from the 17th century, a listed historic object.
- The chapels in the hamlets of Bas-Chardavonet, Haut-Chardavon, at Couloubroux, and Le Fault; at Maur, Pompiéry, Rémusats, and Haut-Savornin.

==== Museums ====
- Ecomuseums: The tailor, the old school, the bugade and the forge.

=== Events ===
- Each year, during the second weekend of August, the last horse competition in France is held at Seyne (a competition for the best mule, with categories).
- During the second weekend of October, an autumn fair is organized (cattle, horses, and a few other animals)

=== Notable people ===
- Antoine Laugier, born in Seyne, died in Aix in 1709, historian of the order of the Trinitarian Order.
- Writer Jean Proal (1904-1969)
- Jacques Clarion, born October 12, 1776, in Saint-Pons, pharmacist to the Army of Italy.
- Historian Abbot Alibert
- The Rémusat family
- Pierre Antoine Chauvet (1728-1808), member of the Legislative Assembly, born in Seyne
- Marc-Antoine Savornin (1753-1816), Deputy to the National Convention during the French Revolution, born in Seyne
- François Massot (born June 9, 1940, in Seyne), Member of the National Assembly from the 1970s to 1990
- Eugène Michel (1821-1885), born in Seyne, Member of Parliament in 1871 and Senator from 1876 to 1885
- Pierre Martin Borély de la Sapie (1814-1895), born in Seyne, colonist in Algeria, farmer, first mayor of Boufarik (Algiers), mayor of Blida, officer of the Légion d'honneur, general counsel of Algiers, Chairman of the USDA of Algiers Advisory Committee, Member of many commissions. See also: Boufarik: a page of colonization of Algeria, Colonel Trumelet
- Sylvain Wojak, model, writer

=== Heraldry ===
Arms of Seyne	Azure three-column rows in base topped by a cross potent between four crosses, all of gold.

== See also ==
- Communes of the Alpes-de-Haute-Provence department
- List of former communes in Alpes-de-Haute-Provence
- Castellane

== Bibliography ==
- Collier, Raymond (1986). La Haute-Provence monumental et artistique [The monumental and artistic Haute-Provence] (in French). Digne: Imprimerie Louis Jean.
- Baratier, Édouard; Duby, Georges; Hildesheimer, Ernest (1969). Atlas historique. Provence, Comtat Venaissin, principauté d'Orange, comté de Nice, principauté de Monaco [Historical Atlas. Comtat Venaissin, Principality of Orange, County of Nice, Provence, Principality of Monaco] (in French). Paris: Librairie Armand Colin. (BnF no. FRBNF35450017h)
- Lechenet, Franck (2007). Plein Ciel sur Vauban [The sky on Vauban] (in French). Editions Cadré Plein ciel. pp. 220–221. ISBN 978-2-9528570-1-7.
