= Barles =

- Commune
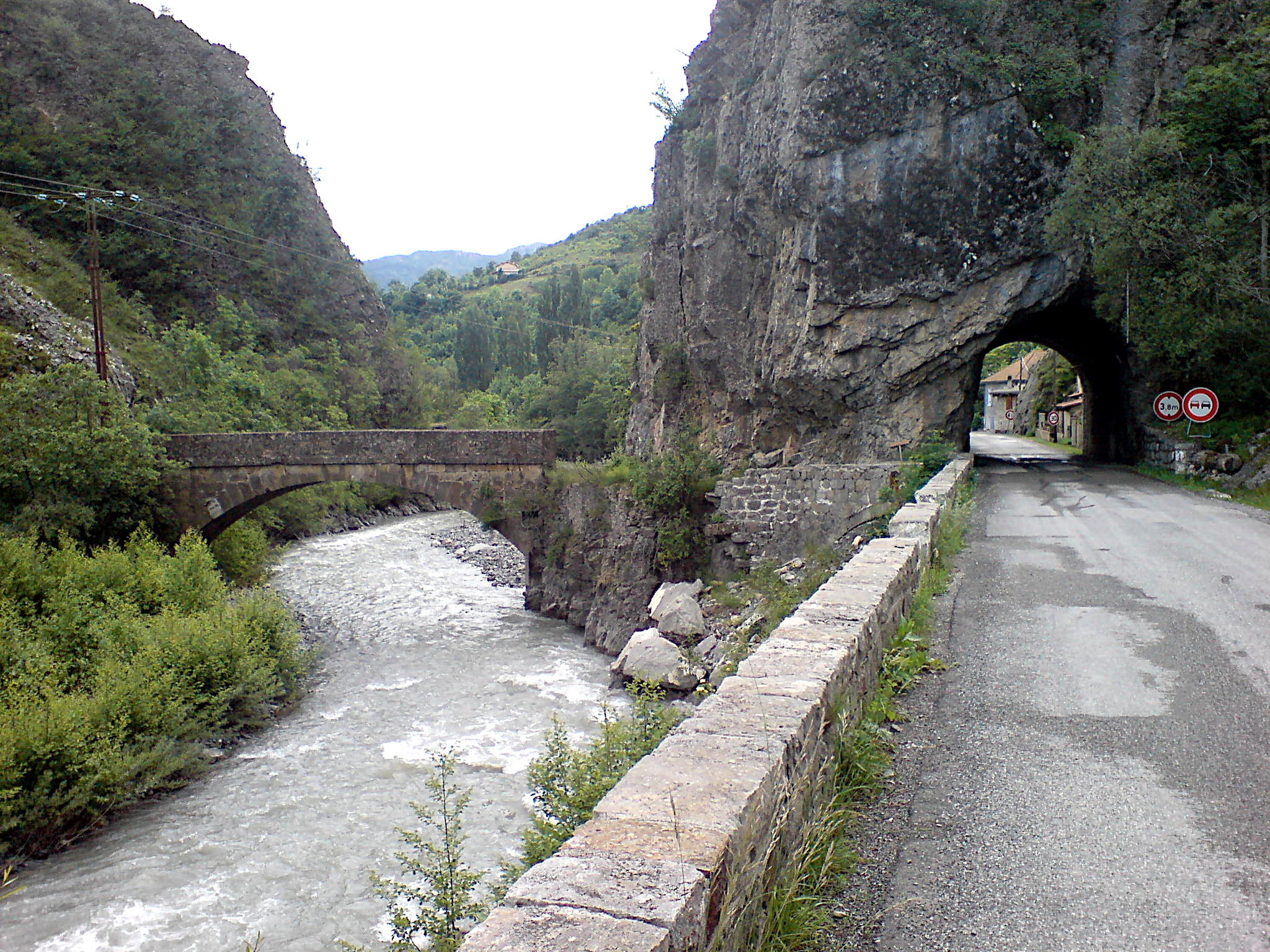
- A view of the bridge over the Bès river and the tunnel at Barles

- Coat of arms
- Location of Barles
- Location within France Location within Provence-Alpes-Côte d'Azur
- Coordinates: 44°15′52″N 6°16′08″E
- Country: France
- Region: Provence-Alpes-Côte d'Azur
- Department: Alpes-de-Haute-Provence
- Arrondissement: Digne-les-Bains
- Canton: Seyne
- Intercommunality: CA Provence-Alpes

Government
  - Mayor (2026–32): Patrick Gaethofs
- Area^{1}: 59.05 km^{2} (22.80 sq mi)
- Elevation: 985 m (3,232 ft)
- Highest elevation: 2,186 m (7,172 ft)
- Lowest elevation: 912 m (2,992 ft)
- Population (2023): 118
  - Density: 2.00/km^{2} (5.18/sq mi)
- Time zone: UTC+01:00 (CET)
  - Summer (DST): UTC+02:00 (CEST)
- INSEE/Postal code: 04020 /04140
- ^{1} French Land Register data, which excludes lakes, ponds, glaciers > 1 km^{2} (0.386 sq mi or 247 acres) and river estuaries.

Barles (French pronunciation: [baʁl]) is a commune in the Alpes-de-Haute-Provence department in the Provence-Alpes-Côte d'Azur region of south-eastern France.

The inhabitants of the commune are known as Barlatans or Barlatanes in French.

== Geography ==
The village is located at an altitude of 987 m in the Bès valley some 30 km north by north-east of Digne-les-Bains and 30 km south by south-east of Gap. Access to the commune is by the D900A road from Verdaches in the east which passes through the village and continues south to Esclangon. The D7 road also comes from Auzet in the north-east and joins the D900A on the eastern border of the commune.

=== Relief ===
Barles is very compartmentalized, divided into valleys separated by high mountains and steep ridges. The Bès Valley links these valleys but, cut by Water gaps, it was not a means of travel for many decades and most travel was on foot and mule along mule tracks via the heights.

Between Barles and Verdaches is the summit of Marzenc at 1934 m and, further north, the Tomples (1955 m). This ridge is passable at the Col des Tomples (1893 m).

The peak of Val-Haut is in the western part of the commune and, between Barles and Bayons are the peaks of Chanau (1885 m) and Oratoire (2072m), both located outside the commune. Farther south are the summits of Clot Ginoux or the Cimettes (2112 m) and Laupie or Tourtoureau (2025 m). A little further south is the Col de la Clapouse (1692 m) deep in the valley of the Descoure stream which gives access to the valley of Esparron-la-Bâtie (Bayons commune). South of Monges (2115 m, Authon commune) is the peak of Chine or Rabanu (1952 m). Many places are named after this peak: Bergerie de Chine (Chine pastures), Old hut of Chine, Collet de Chine, and the Barre de Chine between.

Further south, on the border between Barles and La Robine-sur-Galabre, the main peaks are the Summit of Nibles or Petit Cloche (Small Bell) at 1909 m, and Grande Cloche (Big Bell) or Cloche de Barles at 1885 m which is at the beginning of a long ridge oriented east-west. This ridge is crossed only by the Pas de Pierre (1407 m) and ends at the Barles Water gap. This water gap goes to the other side of the Bès under the name of Serre de la Croix and passes near the Bès via the Pas du Château. The valley of Saint-Clément is closed to the south by the ridge and in the north by the Proussier ridge. The Dou (1971 m), a promontory of Blayeul (2189 m) also known as the Quatre Termes (Four Terms), is located between the communes of Barles, Verdaches, Esclangon (part of La Javie) and Beaujeu.

=== Hydrography ===
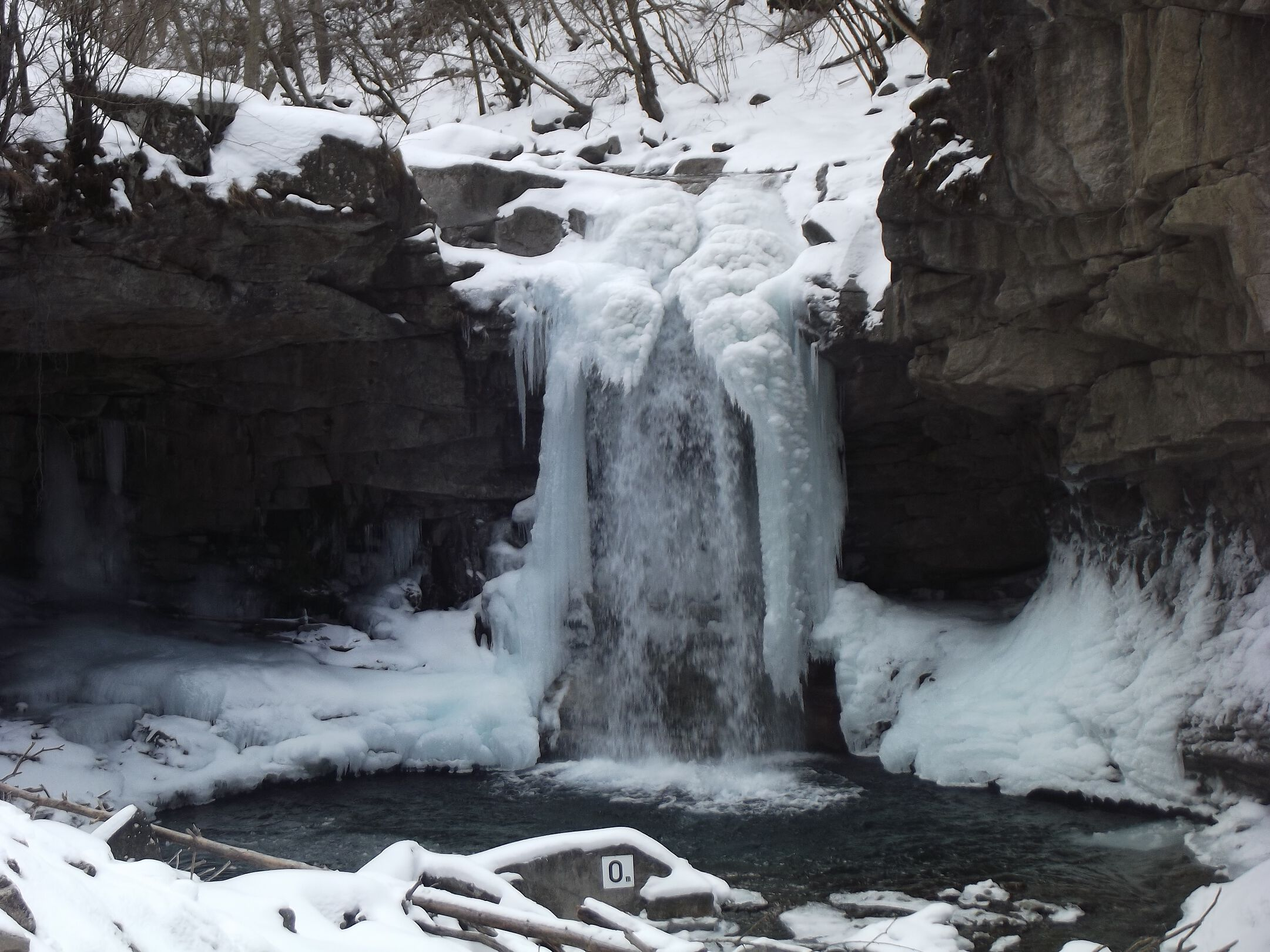
Saut de la Pie Waterfall between Barles and Verdaches

The Bès river passes through the commune and the village flowing west from Verdaches and continuing south to join the Blèone at Plan de Tauze.

Many tributaries flow into the right bank of the Bes in the commune. From east to south-west these are:

- The Ravin de Charui
- The Torrent de Val Haut
- The Descoure
- The Ravin du Pillot
- The Gros Vavon

=== Environment ===
The commune has 862 hectares of woods and forests.

=== Localities and Hamlets ===
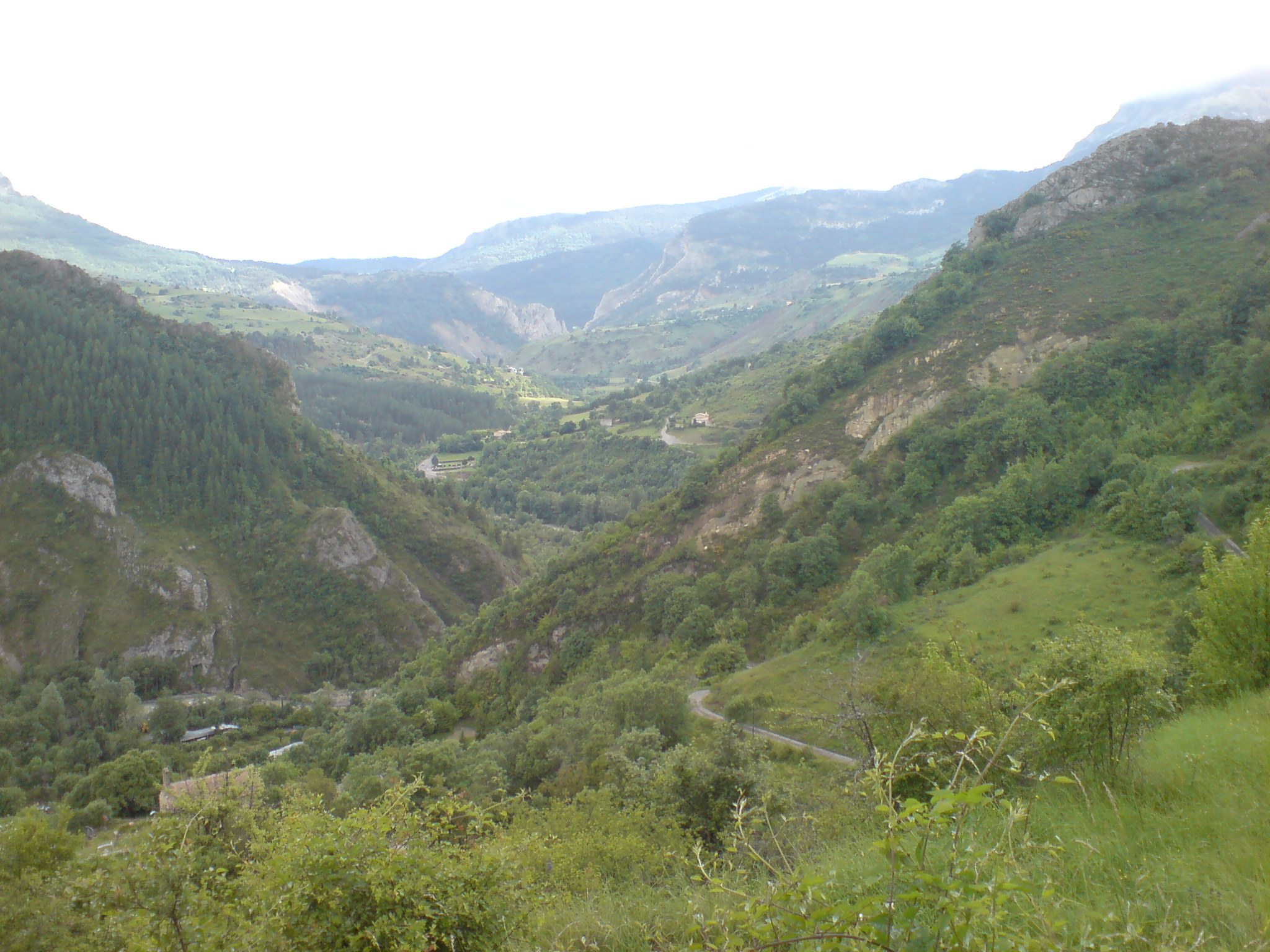
Valley of the Bès, a view south of the village near the Château hamlet.

- Right bank of the Bès:
  - Le Seignas
  - Vaux
  - le Forest (a hamlet)
  - le Château
  - Chine
  - Saint-Pierre
  - le Bourguet
  - le Villard
  - Val-Haut
  - Le Moulin
  - le Prieuré
  - l'Adroit
  - la Sorbière
  - Charruis
  - les Vignes
  - le Jasset
  - Préoura
  - la Lâme
  - les Sauvans
  - Basse-Bloude
  - Haute-Bloude
  - le Mas
  - Paravoux
  - la Gorge
- Left bank of the Bès:
  - La Barricade
  - le Laus
  - les Pinées
  - la Bâtie
  - le Fanget
  - Sigons ou Sigonce
  - Proussier
  - Saint-Clément
  - le Lauset
  - les Eyssarts

=== Natural and technological risks ===
None of the 200 communes in the department is in a no seismic risk zone. The canton of Seyne to which Barles belongs is in area 1b (low risk) according to the deterministic classification of 1991 and based on its seismic history and in zone 4 (medium risk) according to the probabilistic classification EC8 of 2011. Barles also faces four other natural hazards:

- Avalanche
- Forest fire
- Flood
- Earthquake

Barles is not exposed to any risk of technological origin identified by the prefecture.

There is no plan for prevention of foreseeable natural risks (PPR) for the commune and there is no DICRIM.

Among the major floods that have occurred are the storm of 18 August 1739 which caused flooding of Bès and destroyed the embankments and some farmland as well as flooding the low-lying houses. In 1917 heavy rains caused a landslide that blocked the Bès river. The natural dam could not be reached by workmen and a passage was not cleared until the autumn.

== Toponymy ==
According to Charles Rostaing the name of the area comes from the oronymic or mountain root *BAR. According to Ernest Negro, who proposed a similar explanation, the name is formed from the Gallic barro, meaning a summit, and the diminutive -ulus, giving the meaning "small mountain". According to Rostaing, the place name is pre-Gallic.

== History ==
=== Ancient times ===
In Ancient times the Bodiontici populated the Bléone valley as did the Gauls who lived in the area of the modern Barles commune. The Bodiontici were defeated by Augustus at the same time as the other peoples living in the Tropaeum Alpium before 14 BC. Barles was attached to the province of Alpes-Maritimes at the time of its creation in 14 BC.

=== Middle Ages ===
The area appears for the first time in texts in 1193 as Barlis. A castle existed in 1206. In 1300, a small Jewish community was established at Barles. A hospital welcoming the sick and travelers was established at Barles in 1351.

In the Middle Ages some taxes were paid collectively by the community. The distribution per capita was their responsibility and the authorities did not intervene in this distribution. Some taxes were imposed on the Barles community together with Feissal. In the 13th and 14th centuries Barles depended on the viguerie of Digne.

The death of Queen Joanna I of Naples created a crisis of succession for the County of Provence. The towns of the Union of Aix (1382-1387) supported Charles, Duke of Durazzo, against Louis I, Duke of Anjou. The Barles community supported Charles until 1386 then changed sides to join the Angevins due to the negotiations of Marie of Blois, Duchess of Anjou, widow of Louis I, and regent for their son Louis II of Naples. At the end of the war, Marie of Blois attached Barles to the bailiwick of Seyne. At that time the only routes to the south, open only to pedestrians, passed through the Pas de Saint-Pierre (1407 m) and Tanaron in the west and Saint Clement, the Pas-du-Casteou in Esclangon in the East. The most used routes, however, moved to the west and went through Esparron-la-Bâtie or via Feissal and Authon: most of the cultural and economic exchanges were elsewhere in Sisteron but the habit of usually marrying in the Massif des Monges lasted until the 1900s.

=== Modern times ===
In 1602 a lead mine was briefly opened (or simply explored) in Barles at a place called Les Cluses. The ore also contained silver and copper. In 1614 another concession was granted for the same mine.

Excessive deforestation worsened natural climate phenomena such as floods and landslides or mudslides. Landslides in 1746 and 1755 caused the destruction of 20 houses. On the eve of the French Revolution there were two fiefs in Barles: the fief of Barles itself and that of Auzet (from its valuation in 1783). Disorders related to the wheat supply crisis and the new tax system took place in 1790.

=== Contemporary period ===
In 1820, an Italian miner operated a copper mine for a few days. This was the last attempt to mine ore in the commune: in the end none were profitable.

Until the 19th century there were no roads in Barles. The nearest road was the Route nationale 100, from Digne to Coni via the Col du Labouret and Verdaches which was built in 1854. A mule path, Communal path No. 7, was built around the same time and gradually improved in the 1860s: it was the only road construction in Barles in the 19th century. This path was often difficult to use when the weather was bad especially the passage through the Eyssarts ravine (towards Saint Clement) after thunderstorms and Barles was sometimes cut off by landslides (as in 1890 in Tanaron). The clues of Saint-Clément were traversed by tunnels the width of a mule.

As with many communes in the department, Barles adopted schools well before the Jules Ferry laws: in 1863 it had two, installed one in the main village and one in a hamlet, both of which provided primary education for boys. Although the Falloux Laws (1851) did not require the opening of a school for girls unless a commune had more than 800 inhabitants, the commune instructed their girls in 1863. The lack of roads lead to the multiplication of schools: from one for boys in 1863 the commune created five by 1881. These were located in the main village (104 inhabitants, 170 with dependent hamlets in 1881), Vaux (49 inhabitants in 1881), Forest (108 inhabitants), Sauvans (82 inhabitants with Bloudes and Le Mas in 1881), and Saint Clement (87 inhabitants with Lauzet at the same date). The town benefited from subsidies in the second Duruy Law (1877) which were used to build a new school at Sauvans and to renovate the others.

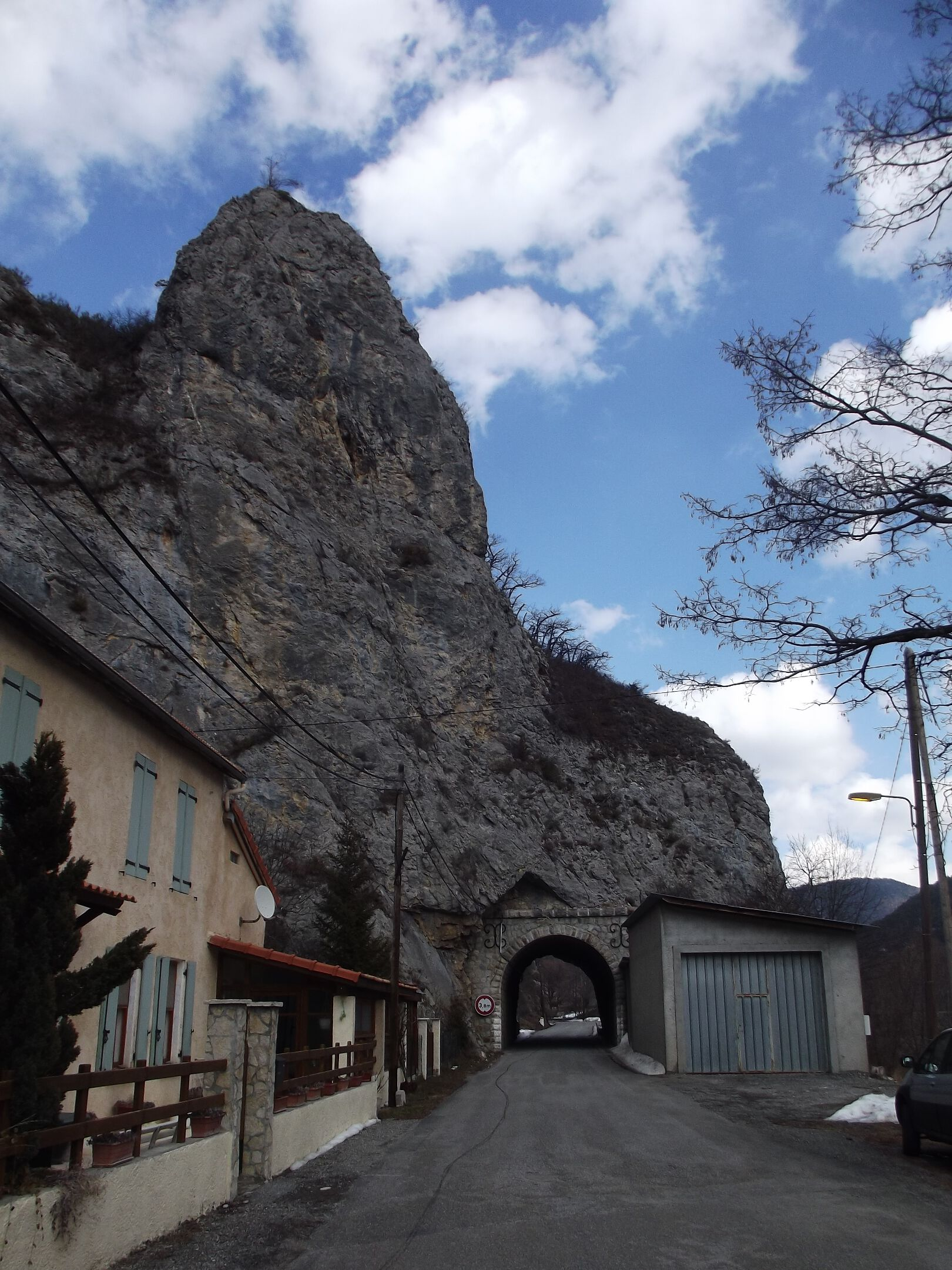
The Barles tunnel, built in the 1900s

The construction of a road through the Barles Water gap was initiated in 1882 to link Digne to Verdaches and Coni. It was inaugurated in July 1913. The construction was long and difficult: starting in 1891 it covered the Saint Clement Water gap (currently called clues de Barles) which, in 1908, was traversed through the drilling of new tunnels. The opening of the road allowed the creation of a Stagecoach service by a Barles innkeeper which was replaced by a coach in the 20th century.

The types of livestock at the end of the 19th century testified to the hardness of farming and livelihoods. There were few horses and oxen were used to work the land (19 horses and 14 oxen). Mules were preferred to work sloping land and light soils. A few years later the fair, which was held in Barles the Monday following May 16, disappeared. Barlatans preferred to attend the fairs at Authon while the people of Saint-Clément preferred those at Digne.

In the 1950s roads were built to serve the hamlets that had preserved the use of mules, pack saddles and sleds until that time.

Barles appears as Barles on the 1750 Cassini Map and the same on the 1790 version.

=== Heraldry ===
Arms of Barles	Blazon: Gules, a pale of Or between 2 bends sinister the same.

== Administration ==
List of Successive Mayors

Mayors from 1800 to 1902

From	To	Name
1800	1805	Jean Baptiste Nicolas
1806	1807	Honoré Meynier
1808	1812	Antoine Arnaud
1813	1815	Jean André Audemar
1815	1816	Joseph Léon Richaud
1816	1818	Jacques Xavier Richaud
1818	1826	Jean Antoine Megy
1827	1829	Jean Jacques Audemar
1829	1831	Jean Barthélémy Bonnet
1831	1833	Alexandre Nicolas
1833	1834	Louis Leydet
1834	1835	Jean André Bonnet
1835	1837	Jean Barthélémy Bonnet
1838	1842	Louis Leydet
1842	1843	Jean Antoine Arnaud
1843	1848	Jean Jacques Audemar
1848	1848	Jean Joseph Richier
1848	1855	Jean Laurent Megy
1855	1860	Jean André Nicolas
1861	1862	Jean Alexandre Leydet
1862	1870	Jean André Bonnet
1871	1876	Pierre Nicolas
1877	1880	Rémy Nicolas
1881	1884	Pierre Nicolas
1884	1892	Jean Baptiste Bonnet
1892	1902	Léon Joseph Amielh

Mayors from 1971

From	To	Name
1971	1983	Aimé Nicolas
1983	2020	Claude Payan
2020	incumbent	Patrick Gaethofs

== Demography ==
Historical population

Year	Pop.	±% p.a.
1793	575	—
1821	526	−0.32%
1846	547	+0.16%
1872	529	−0.13%
1901	475	−0.37%
1926	277	−2.13%
1946	236	−0.80%
1954	206	−1.69%
1962	123	−6.24%

Year	Pop.	±% p.a.
1968	100	−3.39%
1975	81	−2.97%
1982	85	+0.69%
1990	104	+2.55%
1999	114	+1.03%
2007	148	+3.32%
2012	147	−0.14%
2017	134	−1.83%
2023	118	−2.10%

Source: EHESS and INSEE

== Economy ==
=== General overview ===
The commune lives from logging, farming, sheep farming, and tourism.

In 2009, the workforce was 67 people including 16 unemployed (11 at the end of 2011). These workers were mostly employees (40 of 51) and mainly worked outside the commune (36 of 51 workers). Most commune businesses are in the primary sector (15 of 27 in 2010). There are three businesses in the industry and construction sector and nine in service and administration.

=== Agriculture ===
At the end of 2010 the primary sector (agriculture, forestry) had fifteen establishments each with one employee.

According to the Agreste survey by the Ministry of Agriculture the number of farms declined in the 2000s from seven to six including three breeding sheep. The utilized agricultural area (UAA), which increased sharply from 1988 to 2000 and which was 1047 hectares in 1832, sank in the 2000s to less than 850 hectares. The fall was due to the disappearance of two sheep farms in the 2000s (650 of 1000 hectares lost were sheep pastures).

The town is included in the scope of the label Pommes des Alpes de Haute-Durance (Apples of the Alps of Haute-Durance).

=== Industry ===
At the end of 2010 the secondary sector (industry and construction) had 3 establishments without any employees.

=== Service activities ===
At the end of 2010 the tertiary sector (trade, services) had three establishments without any employees to which can be added six administrative facilities with a total of four employees.

According to the Departmental Observatory of Tourism, the tourism function is important for the town, with between 1 and 5 tourists per inhabitant. Most of the accommodation capacity is non-market. Several accommodation facilities for tourism purpose exist in the commune:

- 1 campsite with a capacity of 60 sites;
- 1 "Gites de France" furnished accommodation 3 star with a capacity of 5 beds

Second homes provide an important complement to the capacity with 58 secondary homes containing 258 beds. (30-49% of dwellings are second homes).

=== Education ===
The commune has a primary school.

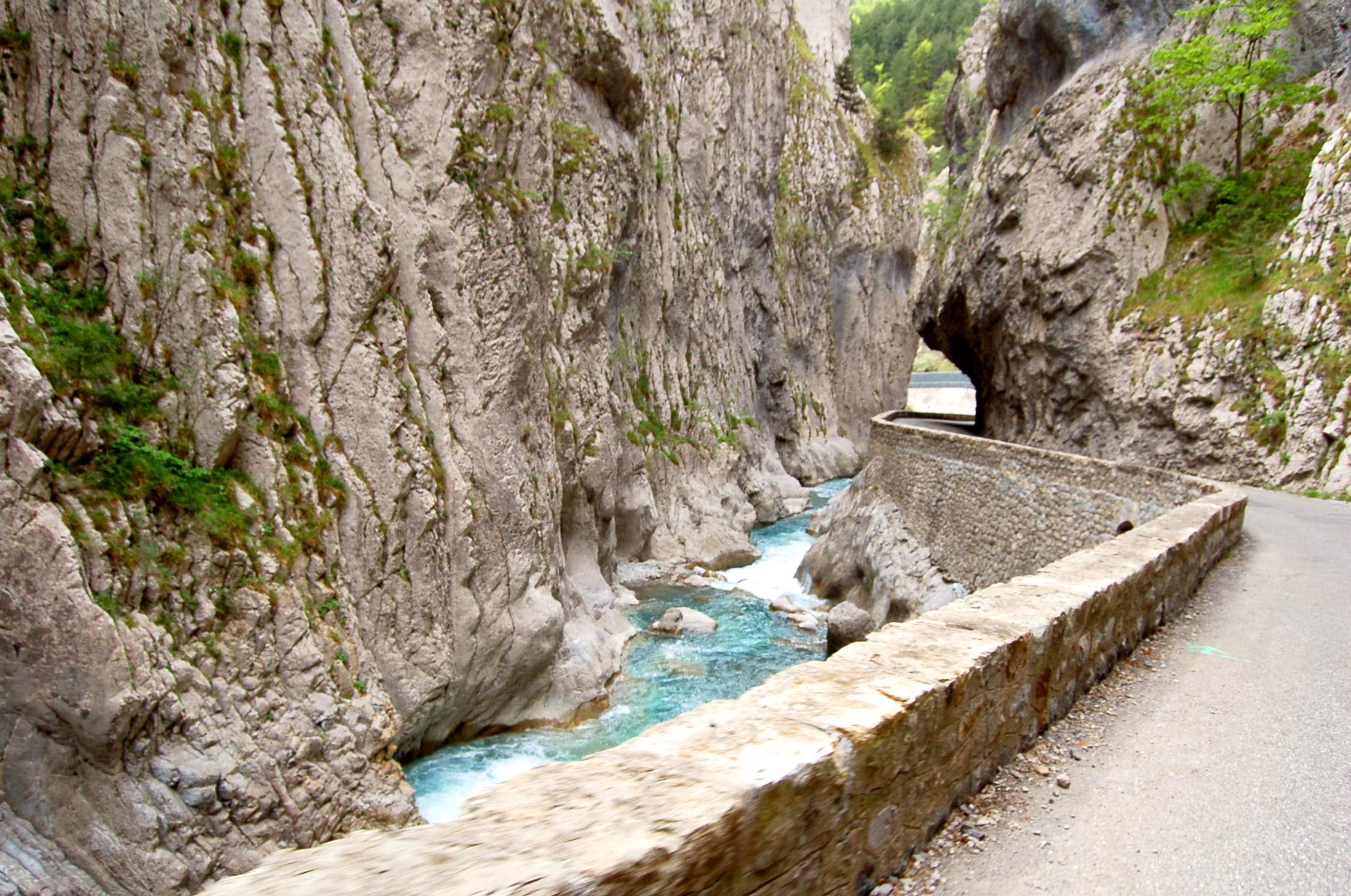
The main Clue de Barles (Barles Water gap) in spring

== Culture and heritage ==
=== Civil heritage ===
The single arch bridge over the Bès dates from 1740. It is built on the old mule road from Digne to Barles via Tanaron. Holes used to fix the Centring during construction are still visible.

=== Religious heritage ===
The Notre-Dame Church was built in 1853 on the site of the former Saint-Roch chapel, which was destroyed at that time, to replace the Saint-Pierre church. It has an apse at each end of the nave. It retains the name Notre Dame which was the parish church at the same time as the Saint-Pierre Church in the Cemetery. In the cemetery Saint Peter's chapel, the old parish church built with gray and yellow stone, was restored in the early 1980s.

The chapel of the priory of Saint-André at Forest is still the subject of an annual pilgrimage. There is also a priory church at Saint Clement.

The Notre Dame Church contains many items that are registered as historical objects:

- A Chalice with Paten (19th century)
- A Monstrance (19th century)
- A Cabinet (19th century)
- A Banner of the Virgin (19th century)
- A Painting: Christ on the cross (19th century)
- A Painting: Assumption of the Virgin (19th century)
- A Processional Cross (19th century)
- An Altar Cross (19th century)
- 6 Candlesticks (19th century)
- A Statue: Virgin and child (18th century)
- A Statue: Saint Joseph (18th century)
- A Clock
- A Pulpit (19th century)
- A Bust Reliquary: Saint Clair (18th century)

=== Environment ===
Barles is best known for the Clues de Barles (Barles Water gaps), two short very constricted canyons located on the road below the village. There are similar formations upstream at the clues de Verdaches.

=== Literature ===
The events in the detective novel Les Courriers de la mort (Messengers of Death) (1986) by Pierre Magnan took place partly in Barles.

== See also ==
- Communes of the Alpes-de-Haute-Provence department

=== Bibliography ===
- Raymond Collier, La Haute-Provence monumentale et artistique, Digne, Imprimerie Louis Jean,? 1986, 559 p. (in French)
- Under the direction of Édouard Baratier, Georges Duby, and Ernest Hildesheimer, Historical Atlas. Provence, Comtat Venaissin, Principality of Orange, County of Nice, Principality of Monaco, Paris, Librairie Armand Colin, 1969 (notice BnF no FRBNF35450017h)
