= Aimé Michel =

French ufologist and author (1919–1992)

Aimé Michel (12 May 1919 – 28 December 1992) was a French UFO specialist, science and spirituality writer and author.

== Biography ==
Aimé Michel was born in Saint-Vincent-les-Forts, now known as Ubaye-Serre-Ponçon, France on 12 May 1919. After obtaining diplomas in psychology and philosophy and passing the entrance exam as a studio sound engineer in 1943, Michel joined the French radio station Radiodiffusion Française in 1944. In 1946, he worked in the research department, where he met with Pierre Schaeffer, who later founded the Groupe de Recherche de Musique Concrète.

Michel published Mystérieux Objets Célestes in 1958, which covered the 1954 wave of UFOs in France. After the publication with help from Jacques Bergier, he devised a theory called Orthoténie (English: orthoteny) in a corner of a restaurant booth. Michel postulated so-called "alignments": straight lines that corresponded to large circles traced and centered on the earth. Michel claimed that UFO sightings could be clustered along these grid lines. He proposed, for example, that there was a line known as “BaVic,” pointing from Bayonne to Vichy, where, out of nine UFO observations cited in the press on 24 September 1954, six aligned (Bayonne, Lencouacq, Tulle, Ussel, Gelles, Vichy).

A member of the editorial board of Lumières dans la nuit from 1969, he wrote numerous articles on UFOs, mysticism, and the animal kingdom. He also wrote about other topics in various journals. During the 1960s, he authored the column "Les mystères du monde animal" in the periodical La vie des bêtes, documenting the mysteries of the animal world. From September 26 to October 10, 1964, Aimé Michel also led cultural workshops on the theme of "Life in the Sidereal Universe", taking place under the backing of the magazine Planète at Cefalù in Sicily.

He wrote the television screenplay Mycenae, the One From the Future, which aired in 1972.

He was a friend of controversial figures like Jacques Bergier and Louis Pauwels, who co-created in 1961 the magazine Planète. He self-described himself as a "pathological" rebel for his cooperation in such activities.

== Bibliography ==
Publications by Aimé Michel
Target/ Type	Series/ Description	Title	Date
Science fiction	Books	Montagnes héroïques, histoire de l'alpinisme	1953
Science fiction	Books	Mystérieux objects célestes	1958
Science fiction	Books	The Voice (contributor)	1960
Science fiction	Books	The Mystery of Dreams, World Encyclopedia (contributor)	1965
Science fiction	Books	The Animal Performance, Hachette	1966
Science fiction	Books	History and Guide to Secret France, Encolypedia Planet	1979
Science fiction	Books	For or against the Flying Saucers	1969
Science fiction	Books	The Humanoids	1969
Science fiction	Books	Mysterious Flying Saucers	1973
Science fiction	Books	The mysticism, the inner man and the ineffable	1973
Science fiction	Books	Metanoia, physical phenomena of mysticism	1973
Science fiction	Books	Soft	2008 (Note: Correspondence addressed to Bertrand Méheust from 1978 to 1990.)
Science fiction	UFO series	2. Lueurs sur les soucoupes volantes	1954 (Note: Published in English as The Truth About Flying Saucers by Robert Hale Publishing in 1957.)
Science fiction	The Unknown Powers of Man series	14. The Extra-Sensory / Calculators prodigies	1976–77
Science fiction	Cheers series	1. The Hidden Face of France (contributor)	1978
Science fiction	Articles	"The end of the world?". Question Journal	1977
Science fiction	Articles	"Clarity in the heart of the labyrinth". Catholic France	2008

== Filmography ==
J.K. Rowling filmography
Year	Title	Credited as
Year	Title	Writer
1968	From animal to man: an interview with Konrad Lorenz	Yes

== See also ==
- Ufology
