= Le Vernet, Alpes-de-Haute-Provence =

Le Vernet
- Commune
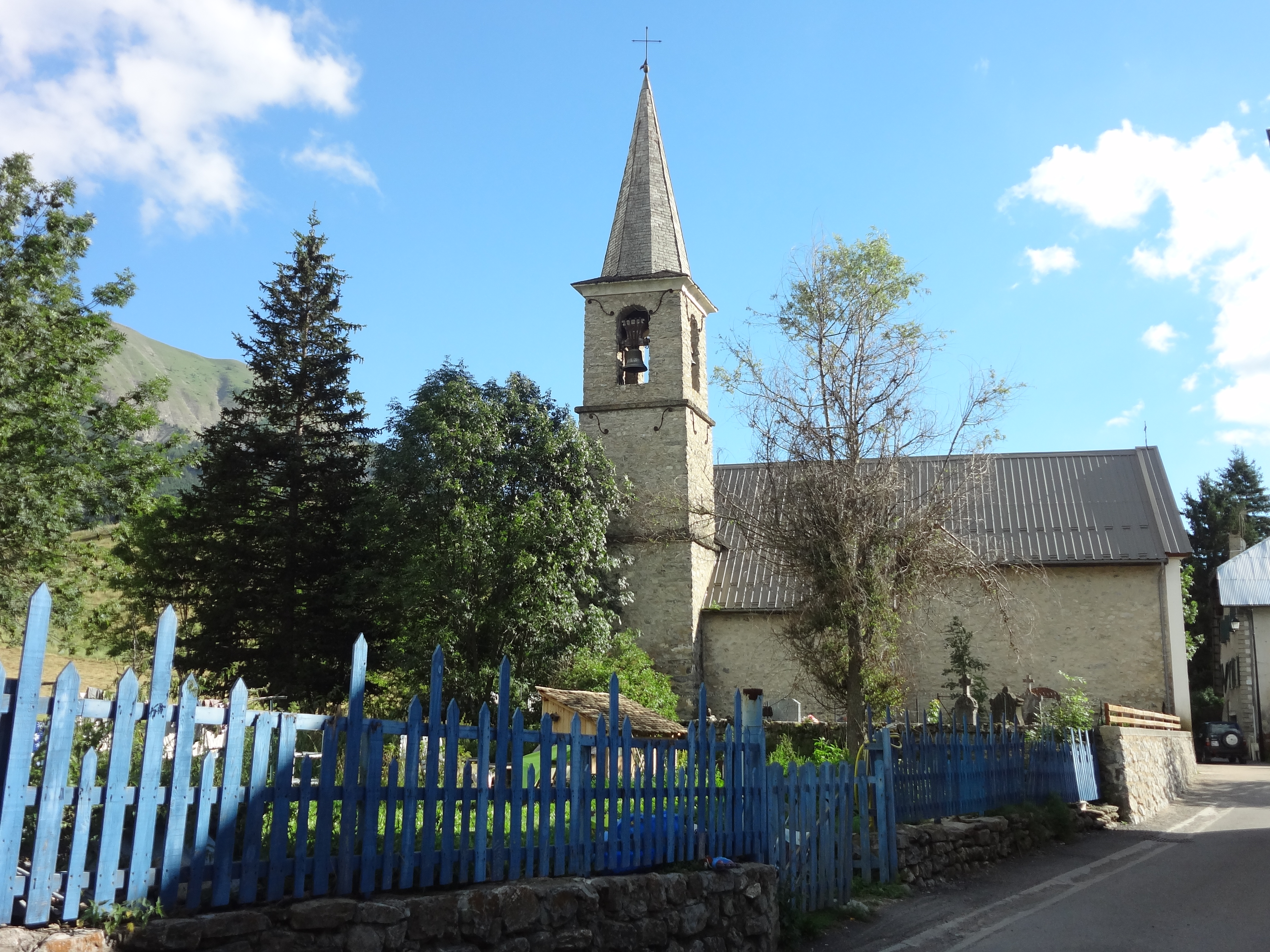
- The church of Sainte-Marthe, in Le Vernet

- Coat of arms
- Location of Le Vernet
- Location within France Location within Provence-Alpes-Côte d'Azur
- Coordinates: 44°16′37″N 6°23′29″E
- Country: France
- Region: Provence-Alpes-Côte d'Azur
- Department: Alpes-de-Haute-Provence
- Arrondissement: Digne-les-Bains
- Canton: Seyne
- Intercommunality: CA Provence-Alpes

Government
  - Mayor (2026–32): Gilles Thezan
- Area^{1}: 23.05 km^{2} (8.90 sq mi)
- Elevation: 1,200 m (3,900 ft)
- Highest elevation: 2,642 m (8,668 ft)
- Lowest elevation: 1,153 m (3,783 ft)
- Population (2023): 132
  - Density: 5.73/km^{2} (14.8/sq mi)
- Time zone: UTC+01:00 (CET)
  - Summer (DST): UTC+02:00 (CEST)
- INSEE/Postal code: 04237 /04140
- ^{1} French Land Register data, which excludes lakes, ponds, glaciers > 1 km^{2} (0.386 sq mi or 247 acres) and river estuaries.

Le Vernet (French pronunciation: [lə vɛʁnɛ]; Occitan: Lo Vernet) is a commune in the Alpes-de-Haute-Provence department, and in the region of Provence-Alpes-Côte d'Azur, in southeastern France.

The name of its inhabitants is Vernetois or Vernetiers.

== Geography ==
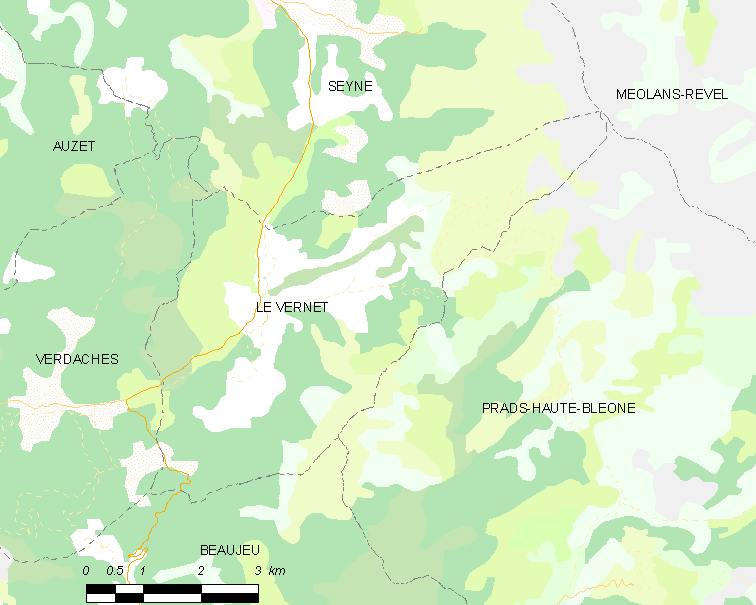
Le Vernet and neighbouring communes

The village of Le Vernet is located in the Bès Valley at 1,200 metres (3,900 ft) altitude. Its population does not exceed 100 permanent residents, but it is often more than doubled each summer and winter, when the municipality becomes the place of departure for sightseeing excursions, particularly in the Blanche Valley, and a place of departure for the nearby ski stations (Grand-Puy, Saint-Jean-Montclar and Chabanon).

The municipality has two main villages, Haut-Vernet, perched high and Bas-Vernet below.

=== Geology ===
During the two last major glaciations, the Riss glaciation and the Würm glaciation, a glacier was present in the upper part of the Riou de la Montagne Valley. During the Riss glaciation, a diffluence of the Blanche glacier crossed the Col de Maure and reached approximately to the location of the village of the current Bas-Vernet. The diffluence was reproduced during the Würm period, but did not reach the territory of Vernet.

=== Relief ===
The Pic des Têtes, at 2,642 metres (8,668 ft), is located within the territory of the commune, as well as the Col du Labouret, in the Massif des Trois-Évêchés.

=== Environment ===
The commune comprises 689 hectares (1,700 acres) of woods and forests.

=== Transport ===
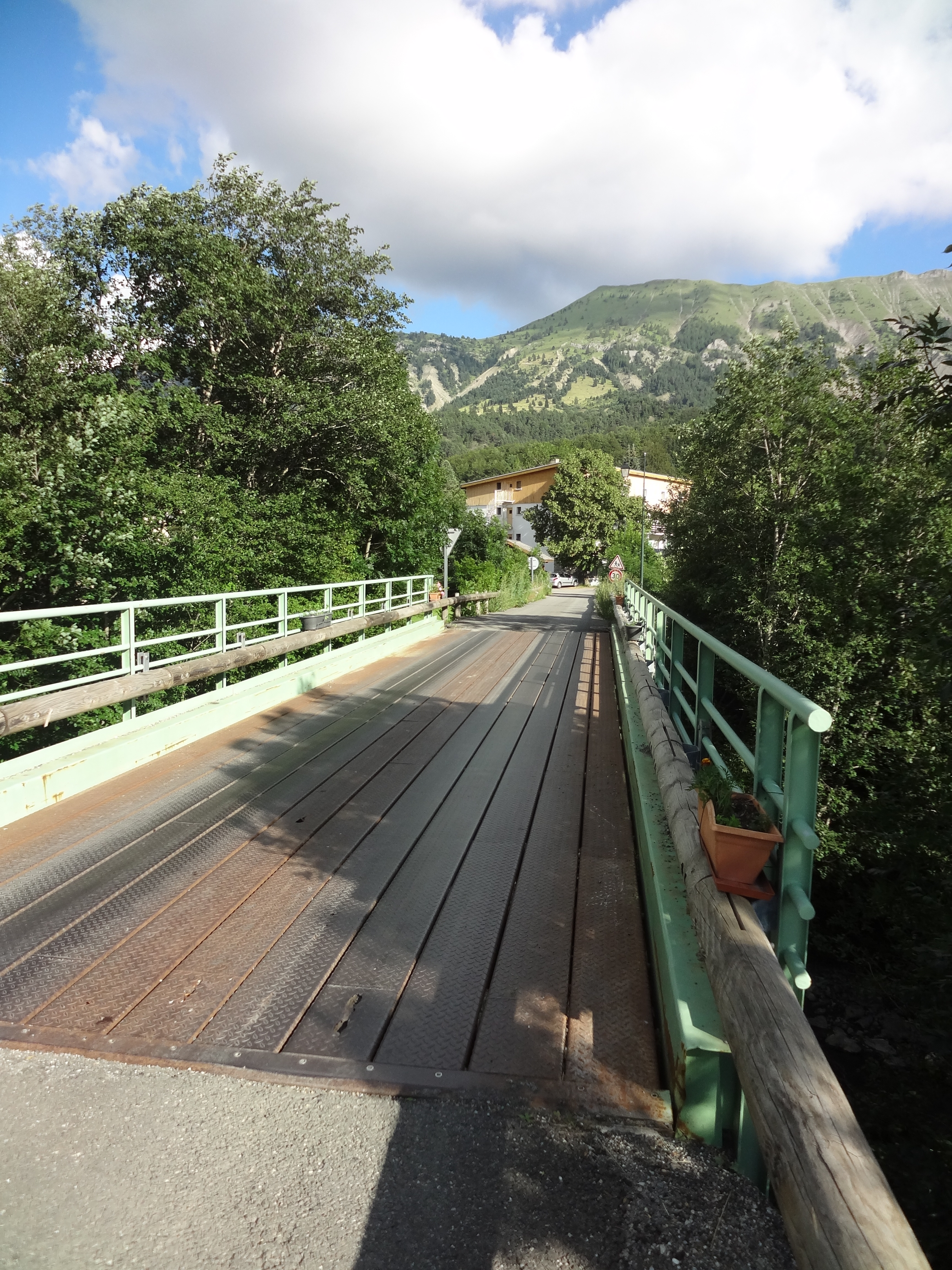
The steel-decked bridge across the Bès

=== Natural and technological hazards ===
None of the 200 communes of the Department is in the zero seismic risk zone. The Canton of Seyne, to which Le Vernet belongs, is in zone 1b (low seismicity) determined by the 1991 classification, based on the historical earthquakes, and in zone 4 (medium risk) according to the probabilistic classification EC8 of 2011. The municipality of Le Vernet is also exposed to four other natural hazards:

- Avalanche
- Forest fire
- Flooding
- Ground movement

The commune of Le Vernet is more exposed to a risk of technological origin, that of transport of dangerous goods by road. The departmentale RD 900 (the former Route nationale 100) can be used for the road transport of dangerous goods.

A predictable natural risk prevention plan (PPR) doesn't exist for the commune and DICRIM does not exist either.

History remembers two earthquakes to have been strongly felt in the town. They exceeded a macro-seismic intensity level V on the MSK scale (sleepers awake, falling objects). The specified intensities are those felt in the town, the intensity can be stronger at the epicentre:

- The earthquake of 22 March 1949 had an intensity level V, and with Le Lauzet at the epicentre
- The earthquake of 31 October 1997 had an intensity level V, and with Prads-Haute-Bléone at the epicentre

== Toponymy ==
According to the Fénie couple, the name of Le Vernet refers to alder.

== History ==
During antiquity, the Bodiontiques (Bodiontici) lived in the Bléone Valley, and were therefore the Gallic people who lived in the current municipality of Vernet. The Bodiontiques, who were defeated by Augustus at the same time as other peoples present on the Tropaeum Alpium (before 14 BC), are attached to the province of Alpes Maritimae at its inception.

The town appears for the first time in charters in the 11th century. The Priory of Saint-Clément was under the Abbey of Saint-Victor in Marseille, via the Priory of Chaudol (now in La Javie). The priory decided the questes and the taille, the lord decided the cavalcade and the albergue. The Comte of Provence Ramon Berenguer IV granted to the community, who reported to the Bailli of Seyne, a consulate in the 13th century.

In the Middle Ages, the great road of Digne to Seyne passed, descending from the Col du Labouret, by Haut-Vernet, without following the Bès Valley.

In 1602, the trial exploitation of a vein of copper was cut short, the deposit actually being very poor. As early as 1604, the owners couldn't pay the workers, some were sent to Villevieille and Verdaches. These mines were given a new concession in 1614, without which their operation would never have restarted.

During the French Revolution, the town had a patriotic society, created after the end of 1792.

As with many communes of the Department, Le Vernet acquired schools well before the Jules Ferry laws: In 1863, it had one each at Haut-Vernet and Bas-Vernet, which provide a primary education for boys. While the Falloux Laws of 1851 required the opening of a girls school for communes with more than 800 inhabitants, and the first Duruy Law of 1867 lowered the threshold to 500 inhabitants, Le Vernet nevertheless opened a school for girls, ahead of the laws. The commune took advantage of subsidies from the second Duruy Law in 1877 to build a new school at Haut-Vernet.

On 24 March 2015, Germanwings Flight 9525, an Airbus A320 flying from Barcelona to Düsseldorf, crashed in the mountains of the neighboring commune of Prads-Haute-Bléone, near to the border with Le Vernet.

== Population and society ==
=== Demography ===
Historical population

Year	Pop.	±% p.a.
1471	18 feus	—
1765	293	—
1793	300	+0.08%
1821	336	+0.41%
1846	327	−0.11%
1872	244	−1.12%
1901	225	−0.28%
1926	135	−2.02%
1946	130	−0.19%
1954	109	−2.18%

Year	Pop.	±% p.a.
1962	85	−3.06%
1968	180	+13.32%
1975	140	−3.53%
1982	63	−10.78%
1990	110	+7.22%
1999	104	−0.62%
2007	129	+2.73%
2012	123	−0.95%
2017	129	+0.96%
2023	132	+0.38%

Population without double counting from 1962 to 1999; municipal population from 2006
Source: Baratier, Georges Duby & Hildesheimer for the Ancien Régime, EHESS (1793-1999) and INSEE (1968-2023)

The demographic history of Le Vernet, after the depopulation of the 14th and 15th centuries and long movement of growth until the beginning of the 19th century, is marked by a period of 'spread' where the population remains stable at a high level. This period lasts from 1806 to 1846. The rural exodus then caused a rapid decline in population, most importantly a long-term movement. Between 1911 and 1921, the municipality records the loss of more than half of its population (relative to the historic maximum). The downward movement is interrupted only in the 1980s. Since then, the population has doubled.

=== Education ===
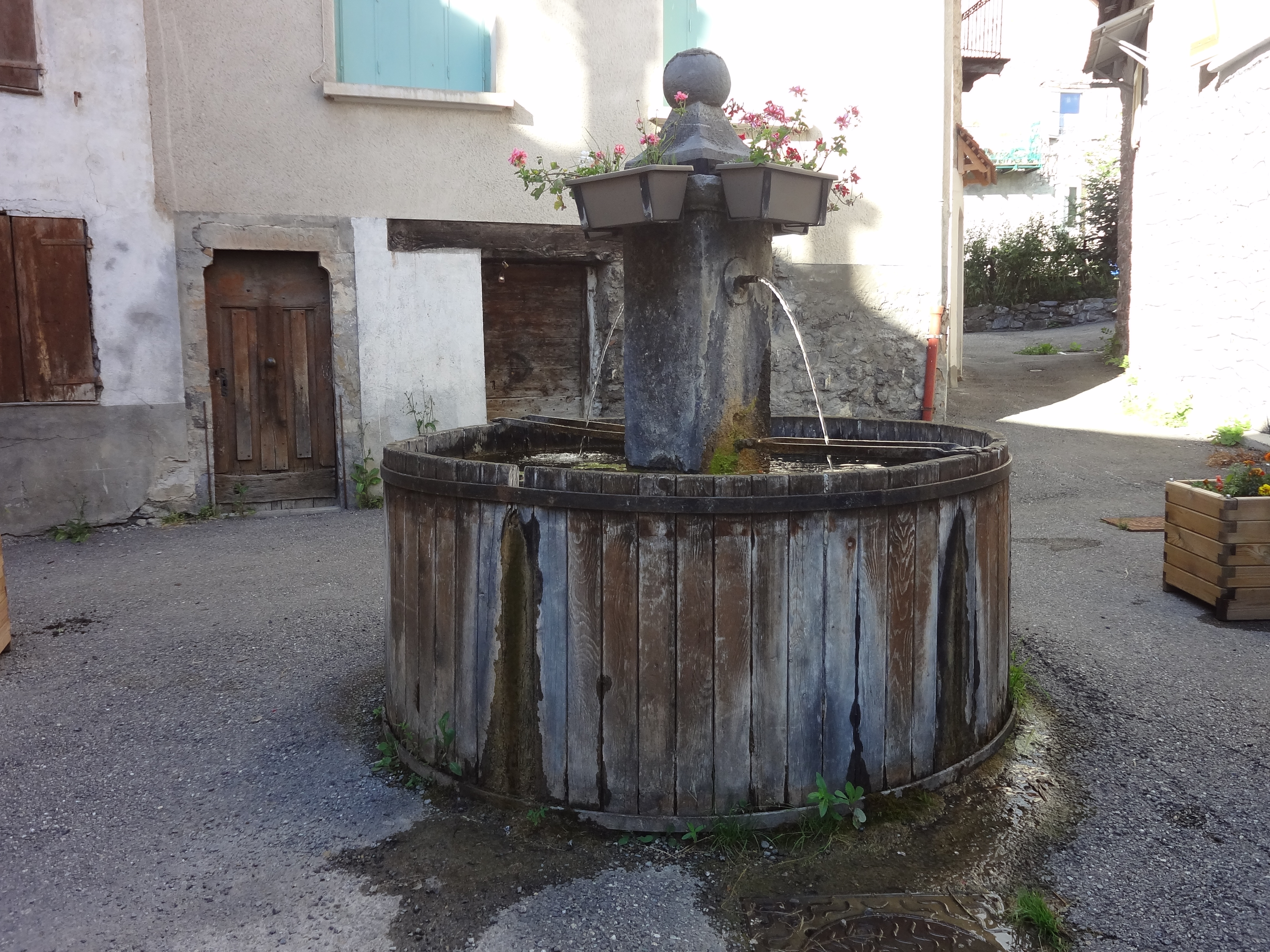
The fountain in Bas-Vernet

The town depends on the Academy of Aix-Marseille. It has a primary school, consisting of 9 students.

=== Religion ===
The Catholic parish of Le Vernet depends on the Diocese of Digne, Riez and Sisteron.

== Local culture and heritage ==
=== Sites and monuments ===
In Bas-Vernet, the parish church of Sainte-Marthe dates from the 19th century.

At Haut-Vernet, the Saint-Martin Church is also from the 19th century.

The chapel of Saint-Pancrace, isolated above Haut-Vernet, is the old parish church. Ruined by the European wars of religion, it was rebuilt, and its roof was repaired again in the 20th century.

- The Oratory of Saint-Roch

=== Notable people ===
- Gaspard Laurent Bayle, physician to Napoleon
- Prosper Demontzey has a monument at the Col du Labouret

=== Heraldry ===
Arms of Le Vernet	The arms of Prads-Haute-Bléone are blazoned : Gold to a tree of vert on a terrace of the same docked two stars of gules.

== See also ==
- Communes of the Alpes-de-Haute-Provence department
- List of ancient communes in Alpes-de-Haute-Provence

== Bibliography ==
- Collier, Raymond (1986). La Haute-Provence monumentale et artistique [The monumental and artistic Haute-Provence] (in French). Digne: Imprimerie Louis Jean.
- Baratier, Édouard; Duby, Georges; Hildesheimer, Ernest (1969). Atlas historique. Provence, Comtat Venaissin, principauté d'Orange, comté de Nice, principauté de Monaco [Historical Atlas. Comtat Venaissin, Principality of Orange, County of Nice, Provence, Principality of Monaco] (in French). Paris: Librairie Armand Colin. (BnF no. FRBNF35450017h)
