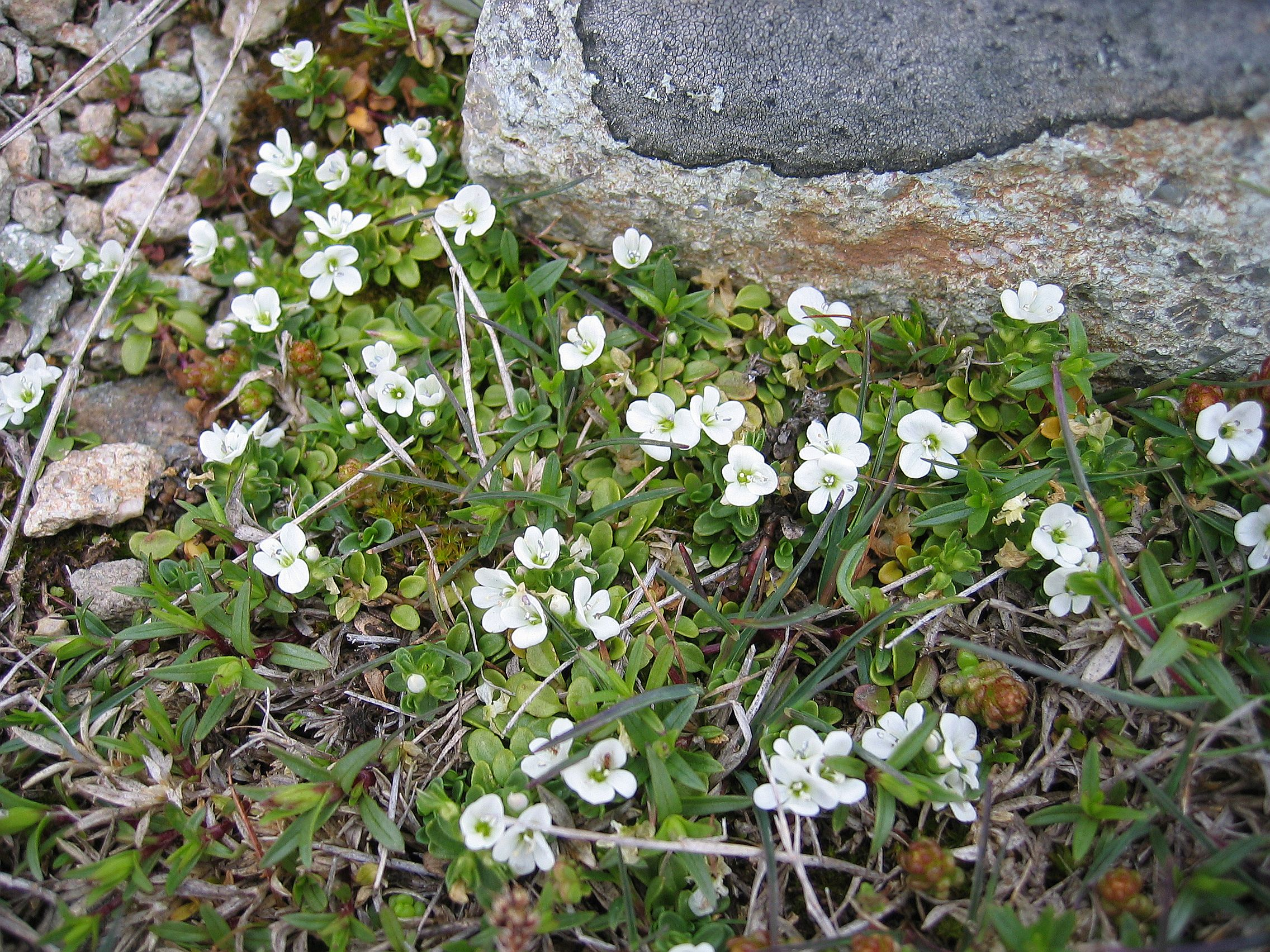
- Habit

Scientific classification
- Kingdom: Plantae
- Clade: Embryophytes
- Clade: Tracheophytes
- Clade: Spermatophytes
- Clade: Angiosperms
- Clade: Eudicots
- Clade: Asterids
- Order: Lamiales
- Family: Plantaginaceae
- Genus: Veronica
- Species: V. repens

Binomial name
- Veronica repens Clarion ex DC.

Synonyms
- Veronica reptans D.H.Kent

= Veronica repens =

Species of flowering plant

Veronica repens, the Corsican speedwell or creeping speedwell, is a species of flowering plant in the family Plantaginaceae, native to Corsica and Morocco. The 'Sunshine' cultivar, whose tiny flowers are purple instead of the usual white, is recommended for rock gardens and as a ground cover.

== Subspecies ==
The following subspecies are accepted:

- Veronica repens subsp. cyanea (Litard. & Maire) Dobignard – Morocco
- Veronica repens subsp. repens
