= Jean Proal =

- Born: 16 July 1904; Seyne-les-Alpes
- Died: 16 July 1969 (aged 65); Avignon
- Occupation: Writer

Jean Proal (16 July 1904 – 24 February 1969) was a French writer.

== Life ==
He wrote some short stories aged twenty-four and twenty-five then his first novel Tempête de printemps at age 28.

Writers such as Jean Giono, Roger Martin du Gard, Marie Mauron... encouraged him. He was friend with Maria Borrély.

Mobilized in 1939 in an artillery regiment, he was reformed in 1940 for health reasons. He had some difficulty in getting himself published, before signing at Éditions Denoël, and despite the critic Léon Derey, he was considered only as a writer following Giono and Ramuz. In 1942, he was transferred to Paris, where he tried to obtain the Prix Goncourt. He began to make himself known to the literary milieu, and received marks of esteem from authors such as Max Jacob, Blaise Cendrars, Jean de La Varende and Jean Rostand

His work amounts to a dozen novels, stories and short stories, and a few interviews.

In 1950 he came to live in Saint-Rémy-de-Provence where he became friends with Louis Aragon and painters such as Hans Hartung and Mario Prassinos. He abandoned his post as official (receiver at registration) and opened a store of electrical appliances in 1951.

He received the Grand prix du roman de la société des gens de lettres for De sel et de cendre in 1953 and was the first Prix de Provence for the whole of his work in 1961.

At his last moments in 1969, he wrote these words: "It is light that makes me breathe." He dies of a lung disease.

== Works ==
=== Novels ===
- 1932: Tempête de printemps, Denoël
- 1933: À hauteur d’homme, Denoël
- 1942: Les Arnaud, Denoël
- 1943: Où souffle la lombarde, Denoël, Prix Cazes
- 1944: Montagne aux solitudes, Denoël
- 1945: Bagarres, Denoël
- 1948: Suite montagnarde, Denoël
- 1948: Au pays du chamois, Denoë
- 1953: De sel et de cendre, Éditions Julliard
- 1955: Le vin d’orage, Julliard, 1955

=== Tales ===
- 1950: Histoire de Lou, Éditions Gallimard, Collection Blanche

=== Essays ===
- Camargue, Lausanne, Marguerat, with photographs by Denys Colomb de Daunant
- Chasse en montagne, Lausanne, Marguerat, 1962, with photographs by Charles Vaucher.
- Chasse en plaine, Lausanne, Marguerat, 1962, with photographs by different artists
- Magie de la Camargue, Ekkehard Presse, with photographs by Denys Colomb de Daunant.

== Adaptation to film ==
- The novel Bagarres was adapted to cinema by Henri Calef in 1948 under the same title Bagarres, with María Casares and Roger Pigaut in the main roles.

== Sources ==
- Jean Proal, une écriture saisissante, bulletin issue 1 de l’Association des Amis de Jean Proal, 2007
