= Auzet =

- Commune
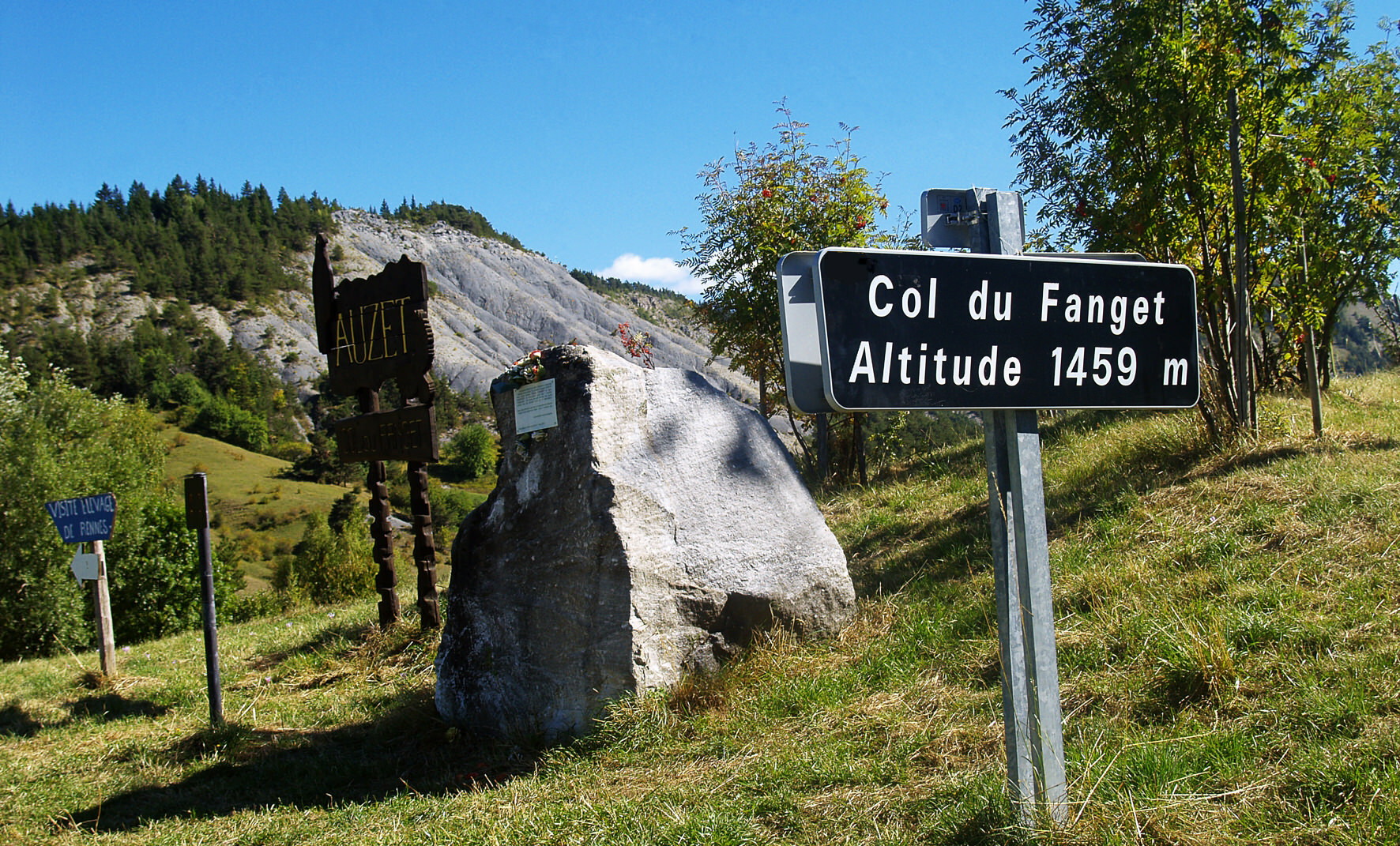
- The Col de Fanget

- Coat of arms
- Location of Auzet
- Location within France Location within Provence-Alpes-Côte d'Azur
- Coordinates: 44°17′42″N 6°19′04″E
- Country: France
- Region: Provence-Alpes-Côte d'Azur
- Department: Alpes-de-Haute-Provence
- Arrondissement: Digne-les-Bains
- Canton: Seyne
- Intercommunality: Provence-Alpes Agglomération

Government
  - Mayor (2026–32): Christian Isoard
- Area^{1}: 34.53 km^{2} (13.33 sq mi)
- Elevation: 1,180 m (3,870 ft)
- Highest elevation: 2,028 m (6,654 ft)
- Lowest elevation: 1,068 m (3,504 ft)
- Population (2023): 102
  - Density: 2.95/km^{2} (7.65/sq mi)
- Time zone: UTC+01:00 (CET)
  - Summer (DST): UTC+02:00 (CEST)
- INSEE/Postal code: 04017 /04140
- ^{1} French Land Register data, which excludes lakes, ponds, glaciers > 1 km^{2} (0.386 sq mi or 247 acres) and river estuaries.

Auzet is a commune in the Alpes-de-Haute-Provence department in the Provence-Alpes-Côte d'Azur region of south-eastern France.

== Geography ==
Auzet is located some 45 km north-east of Sisteron and 35 km west by south-west of Barcelonnette. Access to the commune is by the D7 road from Seyne in the north which passes through the length of the commune and the village and joins the D900A on the southern border of the commune. Apart from the village there are the hamlets of L'Infernet, L'Infernet Haut, and L'Infernet Bas north of the village. The commune is very rugged with snow-capped mountains and forested slopes with 1,168 hectares of forest.

Numerous streams rise mostly in the north of the commune and flow south: the Grave river rises in the north of the commune and gathers countless tributaries as it flows south to join the Bés on the southern border; on the western side the Ravin de Gau, the Ravin de Garnier, the Grave des Planes, and the Ravin du Passavoux all converge with other tributaries to join the Grave; in the east the Ravin du Tourondet, the Ravin du Mairague, and the Ravin du Lausier all flow south and merge to form the Ruisseau de Compolin which continues south to join the Mardaric south of the commune.

The area of the commune is 3,453 hectares and its altitude varies between 1,068 and 2,028 metres. The village is located at 1,180 m above sea level. The highest peaks are the Tête Grosse (Big Head) (2032 m), Clot de Bouc (1962 m) and the cols of Fanget (1459 m) and Grangeasse.

=== Natural and technological hazards ===
None of the 200 communes in the department is in a no seismic risk zone. The Canton of Seyne to which Auzet belongs is zone 1b (low risk) according to the deterministic classification of 1991, which is based on the historical seismic activities, and zone 4 (medium risk) according to the probabilistic classification EC8 of 2011. Auzet is also exposed to four other natural hazards:

- avalanche
- wildfire
- flood
- landslide

Auzet is not exposed to any risk of technological origin identified by the prefecture.

No risk prevention plan for foreseeable natural risks (PPR) exists for the commune and there is no DICRIM.

=== Habitat ===
In 2013 the commune built two certified passive buildings (heating needs are less than 15 kilowatts m²/year) with four housing units at 1200 m altitude.

The passive concept is the most advanced in the world and is the only one which can dispense with conventional heating. The heating power is provided by 10w/m2 of fresh air (ventilation).

== Toponymy ==
The name Auzet appears for the first time in charters of 1058 under the name Ausitum. In referring to sheep belonging to the Abbey of Saint Victor, Marseille, it appeared as Alisino in 814 with forty inhabitants.

== History ==
In 1958 loggers discovered a deposit of iron and bronze objects dating from the La Tène period: spearheads, knives, and bits for horses.

In 1351 reference was made to the community, or rather to its chaplain, indicating that the priest of the church did not depend on an Abbey. From the 13th to the 18th century there was a mill in the ravine of Saint Andrieu.

The death of Queen Joanna I re-opened a succession crisis at the head of the County of Provence with the cities of the Aix Union (1382-1387) supporting Charles de Duras against Louis I of Anjou. The Auzet community supported Duras until 1386 when it switched sides to join the Angevins through patient negotiation by Marie of Blois, widow of Louis I and regent for their son Louis II.

In the 18th century a fair was held in Auzet.

During the French Revolution the commune had a patriotic society formed after the end of 1792.

In the 19th century Auzet was one of the last towns in the region to develop a school: in the survey of 1863 it was among the 17 communes in the department (245) not to possess one and awaited the Jules Ferry laws to install it.

During the Second World War a colony of Jewish children at the Col du Fanget was saved. Joseph Isoard and his brother Armand with their wives Julie and Simone saved Jews from deportation and were therefore distinguished as Righteous among the Nations.

=== Heraldry ===
Arms of Auzet	Blazon: Or, a bell Azure clapper Argent between three oaks of Vert 2 and 1.

== Administration ==
List of Successive Mayors

From	To	Name	Party
1989	2020	Roger Issouard	PCF
2020	2026	Christian Isoard	

== Demography ==
The inhabitants of the commune are known as Auzetans or Auzetanes in French.

Historical population

Year	Pop.	±% p.a.
1793	308	—
1821	302	−0.07%
1846	270	−0.45%
1872	279	+0.13%
1901	232	−0.63%
1926	156	−1.57%
1946	120	−1.30%
1962	111	−0.49%
1968	96	−2.39%

Year	Pop.	±% p.a.
1975	73	−3.84%
1982	67	−1.22%
1990	73	+1.08%
1999	87	+1.97%
2007	82	−0.74%
2012	90	+1.88%
2017	98	+1.72%
2023	102	+0.67%

Source: EHESS and INSEE

== Economy ==
=== Overview ===
In 2017 the active population stood at 45 people including 7 unemployed. These workers are mostly self-employed (58%) and mostly work outside the commune (58%). Most of the employees in the commune have jobs in trade and services with 12 positions.

At the end of 2015 businesses active in the commune were mainly agricultural (7 out of 22 businesses) and the tertiary sector (8 out of 22).

=== Agriculture ===
At the end of 2010 the primary sector (agriculture, forestry, fisheries) had 7 businesses.

The number of farms, according to the Agreste survey by the Ministry of Agriculture, was 7 in 2010, all livestock. Auzet had suffered a severe loss of farms, losing six of the ten farms present in the commune from 1988 to 2000. The utilized agricultural area (UAA) has increased from 418 hectares in 1988 to 728 hectares in 2010 distributed among cattle (656 ha) and sheep (71 ha).

Auzet is included in the area of the label Apples of Alpes de Haute-Durance.

=== Industry ===
At the end of 2010 the secondary sector (industry and construction) had three businesses employing no people.

=== Service activities ===
At the end of 2010 the tertiary sector (trades and services) had eight businesses (employing a total of 12 people) plus four institutions in the administrative sector, health and social (one employee).

The main employer is a school of music - the Music and Environment Centre Fontaine de l’Ours created in 1997.

According to the Departmental Observatory of tourism, tourism is very important for the commune with more than five tourist arrivals per capita. Most of the accommodation capacity is non-market. Several tourist accommodation structures exist in the commune:

- several furnished;
- some cottages;
- several collective accommodation are present including a cottage.

It is nevertheless second homes that weigh heaviest in the capacity with 83 dwellings affected (59% of homes are second homes).

== Local culture and heritage ==
The Parish Church, under the patronage of Saint Andrew and Saint Bartholomew, was built in the 15th or 16th century near Riou but was engulfed by a flood that deposited a lot of gravel in 1787, then again in 1807. Despite some partial cleanup work it became very damp. It was demolished in March 1872 and its reconstruction was completed in 1874. The current nave is 11 m long, 6 m wide and 8.5 m high; the chevet is 6.4 m long. The spire rises to 22.8 m in height. The church contains a silver Ciborium (17th century) which is registered as an historical object.

The Water gap of Verdaches where an ancient cache of arms was found in 1958.

== See also ==
- Communes of the Alpes-de-Haute-Provence department

=== Bibliography ===
- Under the direction of Édouard Baratier, Georges Duby, and Ernest Hildesheimer, Historical Atlas Provence, County of Venaissin, Principality of Orange, County of Nice, Principality of Monaco, Librairie Armand Colin, Paris, 1969 (in French)
- Raymond Collier, Haute-Provence monumental and artistic, Digne, Imprimerie Louis Jean, 1986, 559 p. (in French)
- Jeanne Sicard, "The tribulations of the little church of Auzet", in Chronicles of Haute-Provence, Bulletin de la Société scientifique littéraire des Alpes-de-Haute-Provence, No. 304, 1987 p. 117-126
