= Saint-Vincent-les-Forts =

- Part of Ubaye-Serre-Ponçon
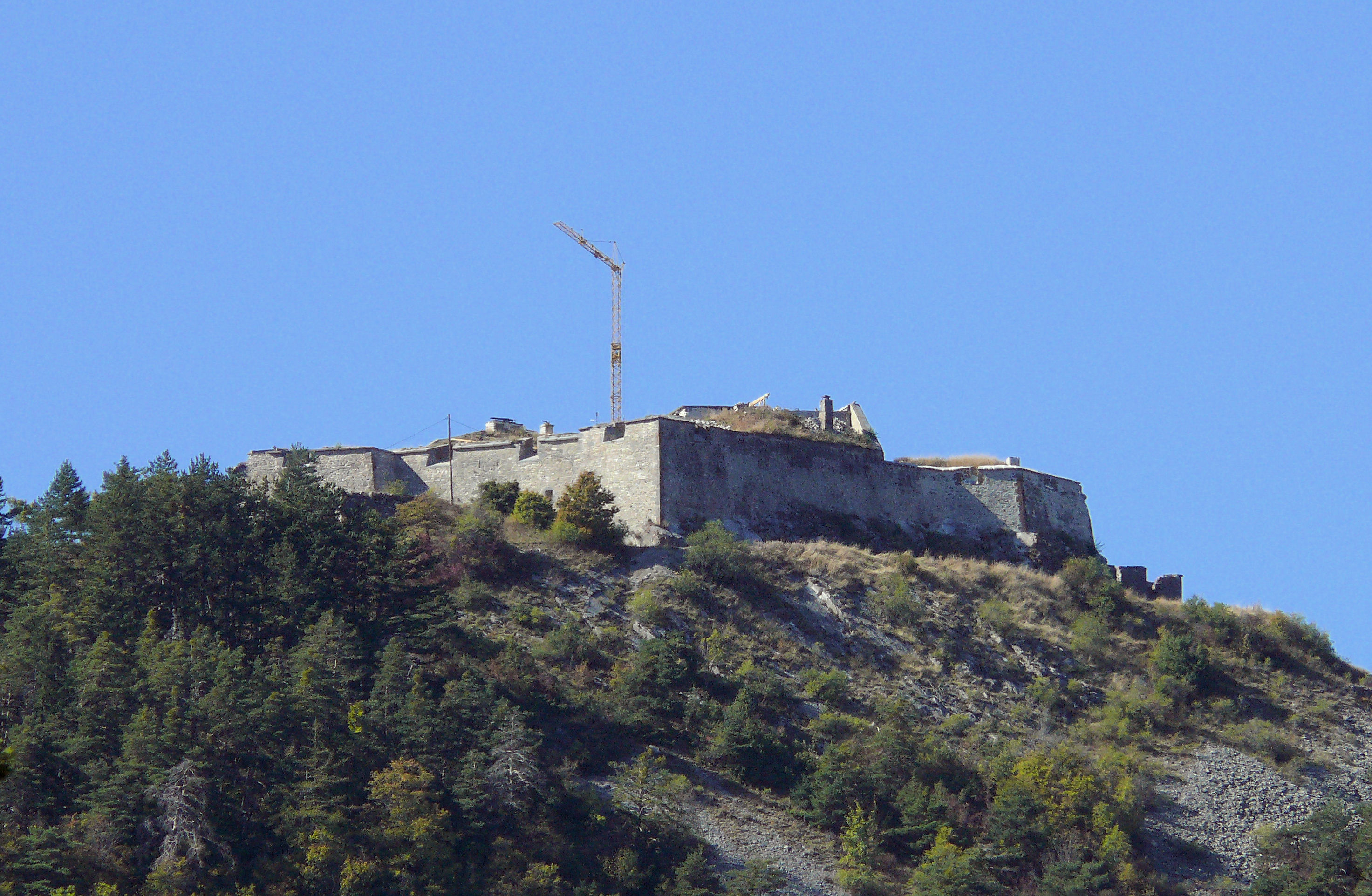
- Fort Joubert

- Coat of arms
- Location of Saint-Vincent-les-Forts
- Location within France Location within Provence-Alpes-Côte d'Azur
- Coordinates: 44°26′46″N 6°22′27″E
- Country: France
- Region: Provence-Alpes-Côte d'Azur
- Department: Alpes-de-Haute-Provence
- Arrondissement: Barcelonnette
- Canton: Barcelonnette
- Commune: Ubaye-Serre-Ponçon
- Area^{1}: 22.82 km^{2} (8.81 sq mi)
- Elevation: 1,300 m (4,300 ft)
- Highest elevation: 2,500 m (8,200 ft)
- Lowest elevation: 770 m (2,530 ft)
- Population (2021): 393
  - Density: 17.2/km^{2} (44.6/sq mi)
- Time zone: UTC+01:00 (CET)
  - Summer (DST): UTC+02:00 (CEST)
- Postal code: 04340
- ^{1} French Land Register data, which excludes lakes, ponds, glaciers > 1 km^{2} (0.386 sq mi or 247 acres) and river estuaries.

Saint-Vincent-les-Forts (French pronunciation: [sɛ̃ vɛ̃sɑ̃ le fɔʁ]; Vivaro-Alpine: Sant Vincenç dei Fòrts) is a former commune in the Alpes-de-Haute-Provence department of southeastern France. On 1 January 2017, it was merged with the commune of La Bréole to form Ubaye-Serre-Ponçon.

== Population ==
Historical population
Year	Pop.	±% p.a.
2006	249	—
2011	318	+5.01%
2021	393	+2.14%
Source: INSEE

== See also ==
- Communes of the Alpes-de-Haute-Provence department
