= Jacques Clarion =

Jacques Clarion (12 October 1779 in Saint-Pons, Alpes-de-Haute-Provence – 28 September 1844 in Garches) was a French medical doctor, pharmacist and botanist.

In his youth, he served as an apprentice-pharmacist in the town of Seyne, while in the meantime studying plants native to the Alps. Up until 1799, he performed military service as a pharmacist third-class in Italy. He later studied medicine in Paris, and in 1805 began work as a pharmacist in the service of Emperor Napoleon. In this role, he served as director of the pharmacy at the Palace Saint-Cloud, a position he maintained during the reigns of Louis XVIII and Charles X.

In 1819 he became an assistant professor at the Ecole de Pharmacie de Paris, and in 1825 a professor of botany. From 1822 to 1830 he was a member of the Académie de Médecine.

In 1812, the botanical genus Clarionea (Lagasca ex A. P. de Candolle, 1812) was named in his honor.

== Published works ==
- Observations sur l'analyse des végétaux suivies d'un travail chimique sur les rhubarbe exotique et indigène, 1803 - Comments on botanical analysis, followed by chemical studies of exotic and native rhubarb.
- Abrégé de médecine pratique, ou Manuel médical d'après les principes de la doctrine physiologique, 1832 - Medical manual on principles of physiological doctrine.
- Nouveau Précis des maladies des enfans fondé sur la doctrine, 1833 - On childhood diseases based on physiological doctrine.
