= Ubaye-Serre-Ponçon =

- Commune
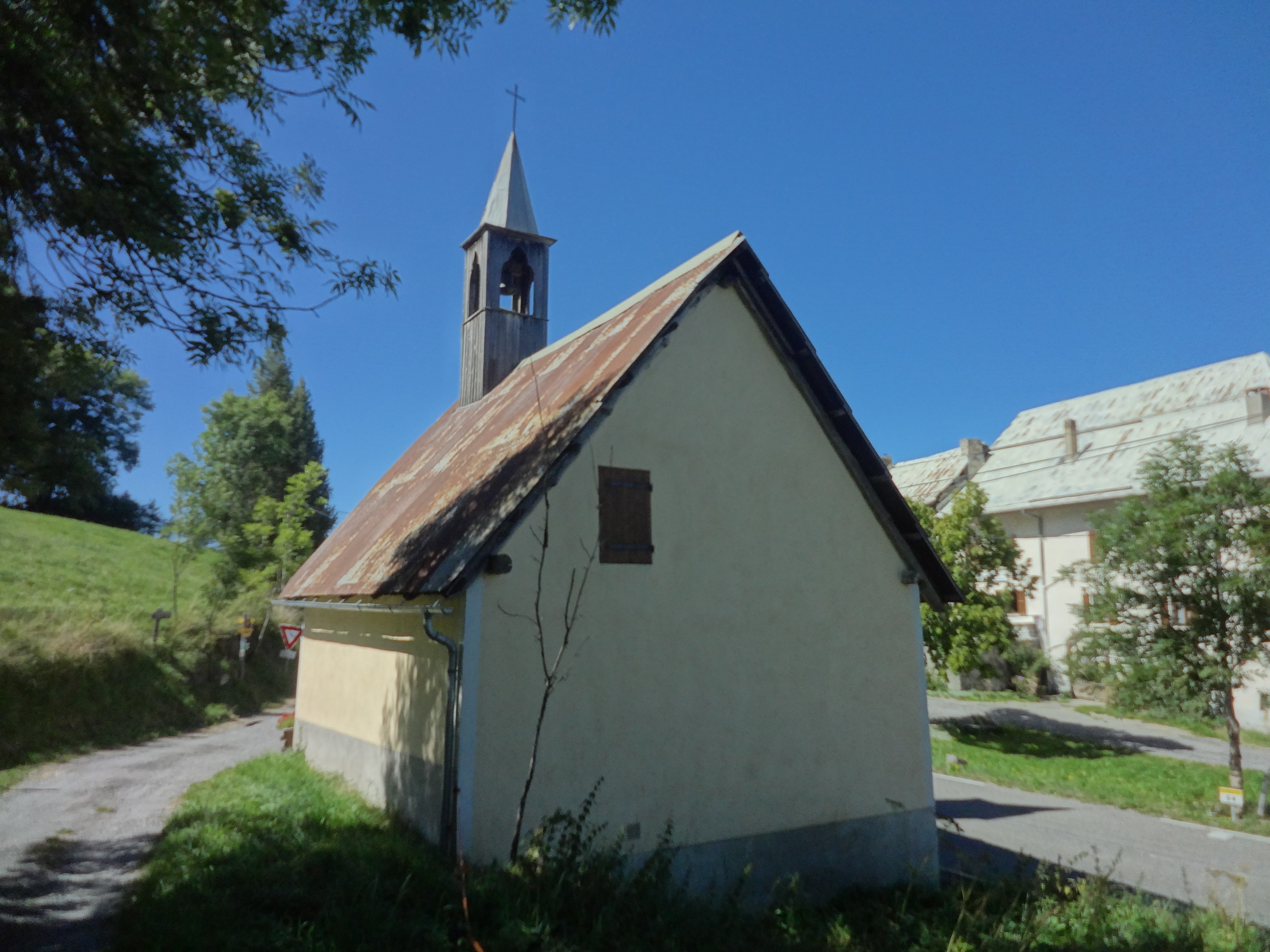
- Chapelle des Rollands, Saint-Vincent-les-Forts
- Location of Ubaye-Serre-Ponçon
- Location within France Location within Provence-Alpes-Côte d'Azur
- Coordinates: 44°27′25″N 6°17′42″E
- Country: France
- Region: Provence-Alpes-Côte d'Azur
- Department: Alpes-de-Haute-Provence
- Arrondissement: Barcelonnette
- Canton: Barcelonnette
- Intercommunality: CC Vallée de l'Ubaye Serre-Ponçon

Government
  - Mayor (2026–32): Jean-Michel Tron
- Area^{1}: 62.48 km^{2} (24.12 sq mi)
- Population (2023): 786
  - Density: 12.6/km^{2} (32.6/sq mi)
- Time zone: UTC+01:00 (CET)
  - Summer (DST): UTC+02:00 (CEST)
- INSEE/Postal code: 04033 /04340
- ^{1} French Land Register data, which excludes lakes, ponds, glaciers > 1 km^{2} (0.386 sq mi or 247 acres) and river estuaries.

Ubaye-Serre-Ponçon (French pronunciation: [ybaj sɛʁ pɔ̃sɔ̃]; Vivaro-Alpine: Ubaia e La Sèrra de Ponçon) is a commune in the department of Alpes-de-Haute-Provence, southeastern France. It was formed on 1 January 2017 from the merger of the former communes of La Bréole (the seat) and Saint-Vincent-les-Forts.

== See also ==
- Communes of the Alpes-de-Haute-Provence department
