= Viguerie =

French medieval court jurisdiction

In Southern France, a viguerie (French pronunciation: [viɡʁi]; Latin: vicaria) was a mediaeval administrative court. A viguerie is named for the place it serves or is found in, that is, the main town of the borough, which need not be its chef-lieu (administrative capital).

Appearing during the Carolingian dynasty, the viguerie started as the seat of civil and criminal justice, taking its name from the Count or Viscount. With the decline of feudal power and its transfer to Royal jurisdiction, the viguerie became the lowest court, dealing only with day-to-day affairs. It was administered by a viguier, a judge whose remit varied, over time and space, from that of a judge of a Court of Assize to that of a judge of a Court of Common Pleas.

Vigueries largely disappeared after 1749, following an edict suppressing the lower courts. Even so, in many regions such as Provence, they survived until the French Revolution. In Languedoc, Rouergue and Carladés, they transformed into the lowest Courts of Appeal.

In other regions similar courts were named for the title of the title or rank of the person who held responsibility for them, such as châtellenie (administered by a châtelain), prévôté (under a prévôt), vicomté (under a viscount), and a bailie or baillage or sénéchaussée (administered by a bailiff).

== See also ==
- Magistrate, a minor lawyer in the United Kingdom
- Vicar, one who administers religious law
- Vegueria, in Catalonia
- Ancien Régime in France (section Justice)
