= Selonnet =

- Commune
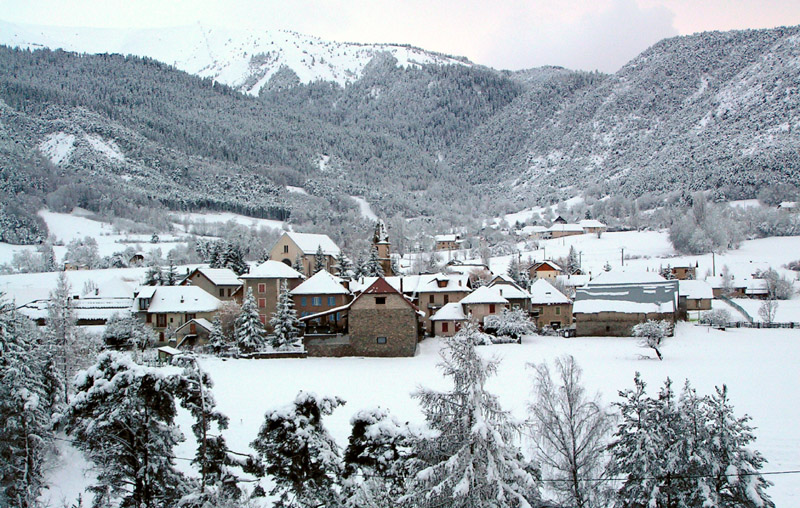
- A view of the village of Selonnet, in winter

- Coat of arms
- Location of Selonnet
- Location within France Location within Provence-Alpes-Côte d'Azur
- Coordinates: 44°22′20″N 6°18′43″E
- Country: France
- Region: Provence-Alpes-Côte d'Azur
- Department: Alpes-de-Haute-Provence
- Arrondissement: Digne-les-Bains
- Canton: Seyne
- Intercommunality: CA Provence-Alpes

Government
  - Mayor (2026–32): Benoît Cazeres
- Area^{1}: 29.55 km^{2} (11.41 sq mi)
- Highest elevation: 2,028 m (6,654 ft)
- Lowest elevation: 846 m (2,776 ft)
- Population (2023): 443
  - Density: 15.0/km^{2} (38.8/sq mi)
- Time zone: UTC+01:00 (CET)
  - Summer (DST): UTC+02:00 (CEST)
- INSEE/Postal code: 04203 /04140
- ^{1} French Land Register data, which excludes lakes, ponds, glaciers > 1 km^{2} (0.386 sq mi or 247 acres) and river estuaries.

Selonnet (French pronunciation: [səlɔnɛ]; Occitan: Selonet) is a commune in the Alpes-de-Haute-Provence department in southeastern France.

== Population ==
Historical population
Year	Pop.	±% p.a.
1968	289	—
1975	258	−1.61%
1982	274	+0.86%
1990	331	+2.39%
1999	404	+2.24%
2007	427	+0.69%
2012	436	+0.42%
2017	464	+1.25%
2023	443	−0.77%
Source: INSEE

== See also ==
- Communes of the Alpes-de-Haute-Provence department
