= La Bréole =

- Part of Ubaye-Serre-Ponçon
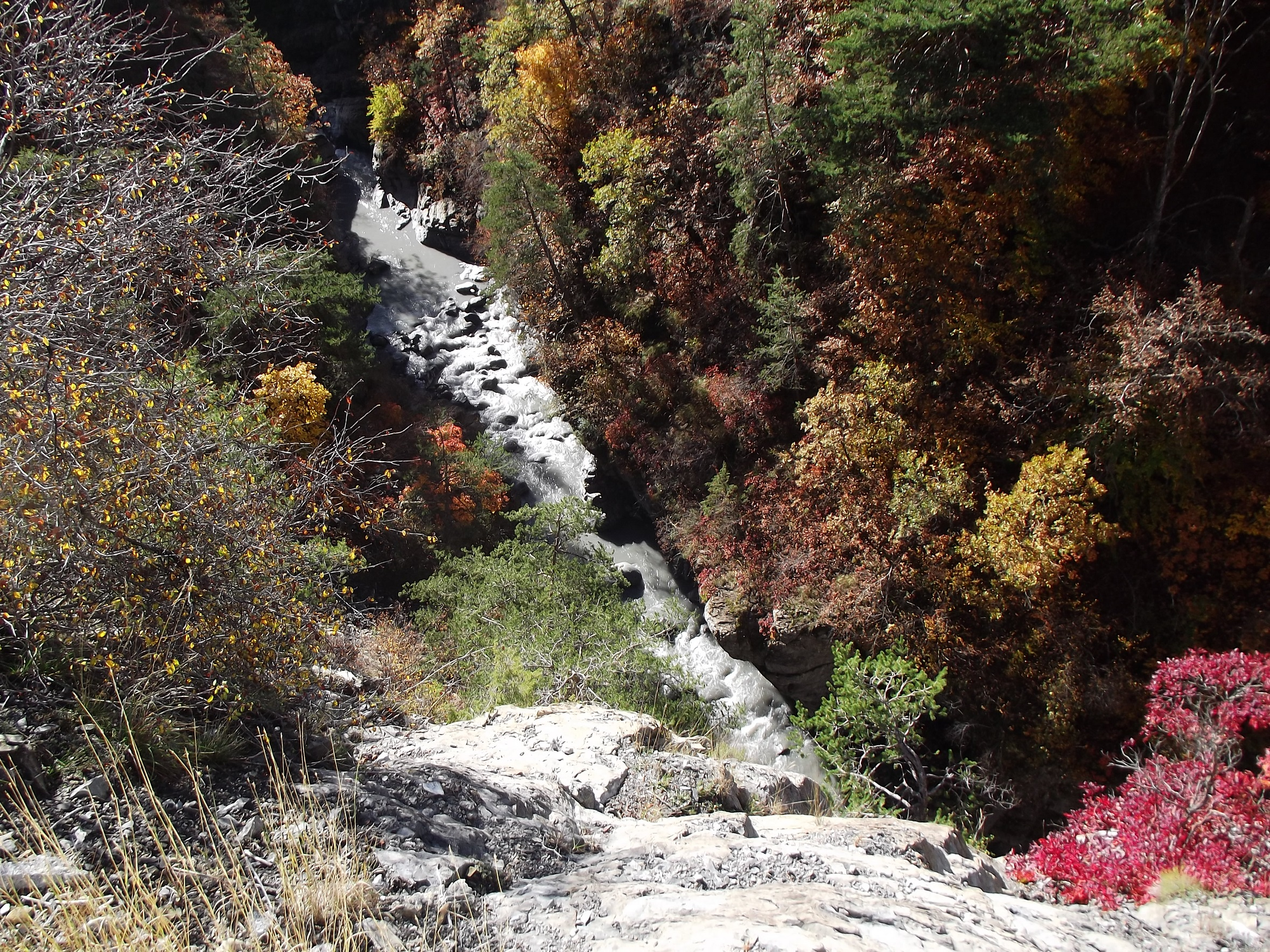
- The gorge in La Bréole

- Coat of arms
- Location of La Bréole
- Location within France Location within Provence-Alpes-Côte d'Azur
- Coordinates: 44°27′27″N 6°17′43″E
- Country: France
- Region: Provence-Alpes-Côte d'Azur
- Department: Alpes-de-Haute-Provence
- Arrondissement: Barcelonnette
- Canton: Barcelonnette
- Commune: Ubaye-Serre-Ponçon
- Area^{1}: 39.66 km^{2} (15.31 sq mi)
- Elevation: 998 m (3,274 ft)
- Highest elevation: 1,590 m (5,220 ft)
- Lowest elevation: 650 m (2,130 ft)
- Population (2021): 395
  - Density: 9.96/km^{2} (25.8/sq mi)
- Time zone: UTC+01:00 (CET)
  - Summer (DST): UTC+02:00 (CEST)
- Postal code: 04340
- ^{1} French Land Register data, which excludes lakes, ponds, glaciers > 1 km^{2} (0.386 sq mi or 247 acres) and river estuaries.

La Bréole (French pronunciation: [la bʁeɔl]; Vivaro-Alpine: La Breula) is a former commune in the Alpes-de-Haute-Provence department in southeastern France. On 1 January 2017, it was merged into the new commune Ubaye-Serre-Ponçon.

== Population ==
Historical population
| Year | Pop. | ±% p.a. |
|---|---|---|
| 2006 | 342 | — |
| 2011 | 394 | +2.87% |
| 2021 | 395 | +0.03% |
Source: INSEE

== See also ==
- Communes of the Alpes-de-Haute-Provence department
