= Verdaches =

- Commune
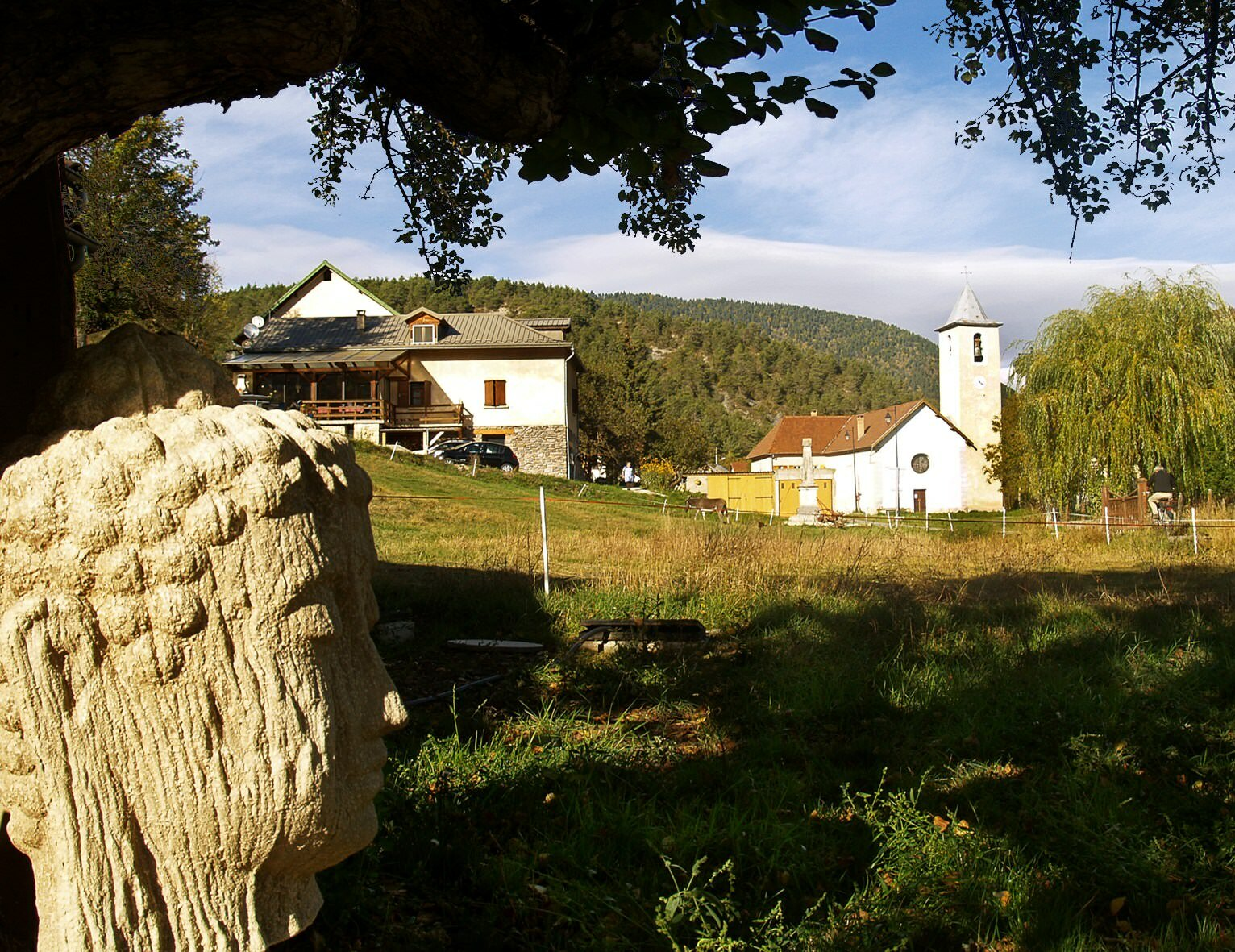
- The entrance to the village of Verdaches

- Coat of arms
- Location of Verdaches
- Location within France Location within Provence-Alpes-Côte d'Azur
- Coordinates: 44°15′51″N 6°20′35″E
- Country: France
- Region: Provence-Alpes-Côte d'Azur
- Department: Alpes-de-Haute-Provence
- Arrondissement: Digne-les-Bains
- Canton: Seyne
- Intercommunality: CA Provence-Alpes

Government
  - Mayor (2026–32): Bruno Lombard
- Area^{1}: 22.92 km^{2} (8.85 sq mi)
- Elevation: 1,127 m (3,698 ft)
- Highest elevation: 2,186 m (7,172 ft)
- Lowest elevation: 1,078 m (3,537 ft)
- Population (2023): 61
  - Density: 2.7/km^{2} (6.9/sq mi)
- Time zone: UTC+01:00 (CET)
  - Summer (DST): UTC+02:00 (CEST)
- INSEE/Postal code: 04235 /04140
- ^{1} French Land Register data, which excludes lakes, ponds, glaciers > 1 km^{2} (0.386 sq mi or 247 acres) and river estuaries.

Verdaches (French pronunciation: [vɛʁdaʃ]; Occitan: Verdacha) is a commune in the Alpes-de-Haute-Provence department in southeastern France.

== Population ==
Historical population
Year	Pop.	±% p.a.
1968	95	—
1975	72	−3.88%
1982	72	+0.00%
1990	61	−2.05%
1999	48	−2.63%
2007	64	+3.66%
2012	60	−1.28%
2017	59	−0.34%
2023	61	+0.56%
Source: INSEE

== See also ==
- Communes of the Alpes-de-Haute-Provence department
