= Canton of Savines-le-Lac =

Coordinates: 44°31′37″N 6°24′20″E

Savines-le-Lac
- Former canton
- Interactive map of Savines-le-Lac
- Country: France
- Region: Provence-Alpes-Côte d'Azur
- Department: Hautes-Alpes
- No. of communes: {{{nbcomm}}}
- Disbanded: 2015
- Area: 135.25 km^{2} (52.22 sq mi)
- Population (2012): 1,943
  - Density: 14.37/km^{2} (37.21/sq mi)

The Canton of Savines-le-Lac is a former canton in the Arrondissement of Gap in the department of Hautes-Alpes in the region Provence-Alpes-Côte d'Azur in France. It was disbanded following the French canton reorganisation which came into effect in March 2015. It consisted of 6 communes, which joined the canton of Chorges in 2015. It had 1,943 inhabitants (2012). Its main town and commune was Savines-le-Lac and its last representative in the conseil général was Victor Berengue.

== Communes ==
It consisted of the following communes:

- Puy-Saint-Eusèbe
- Puy-Sanières
- Réallon
- Saint-Apollinaire
- Le Sauze-du-Lac
- Savines-le-Lac

== See also ==
- Cantons of the Hautes-Alpes department
