= 2017 Tour de France, Stage 12 to Stage 21 =

Stages of cycle race

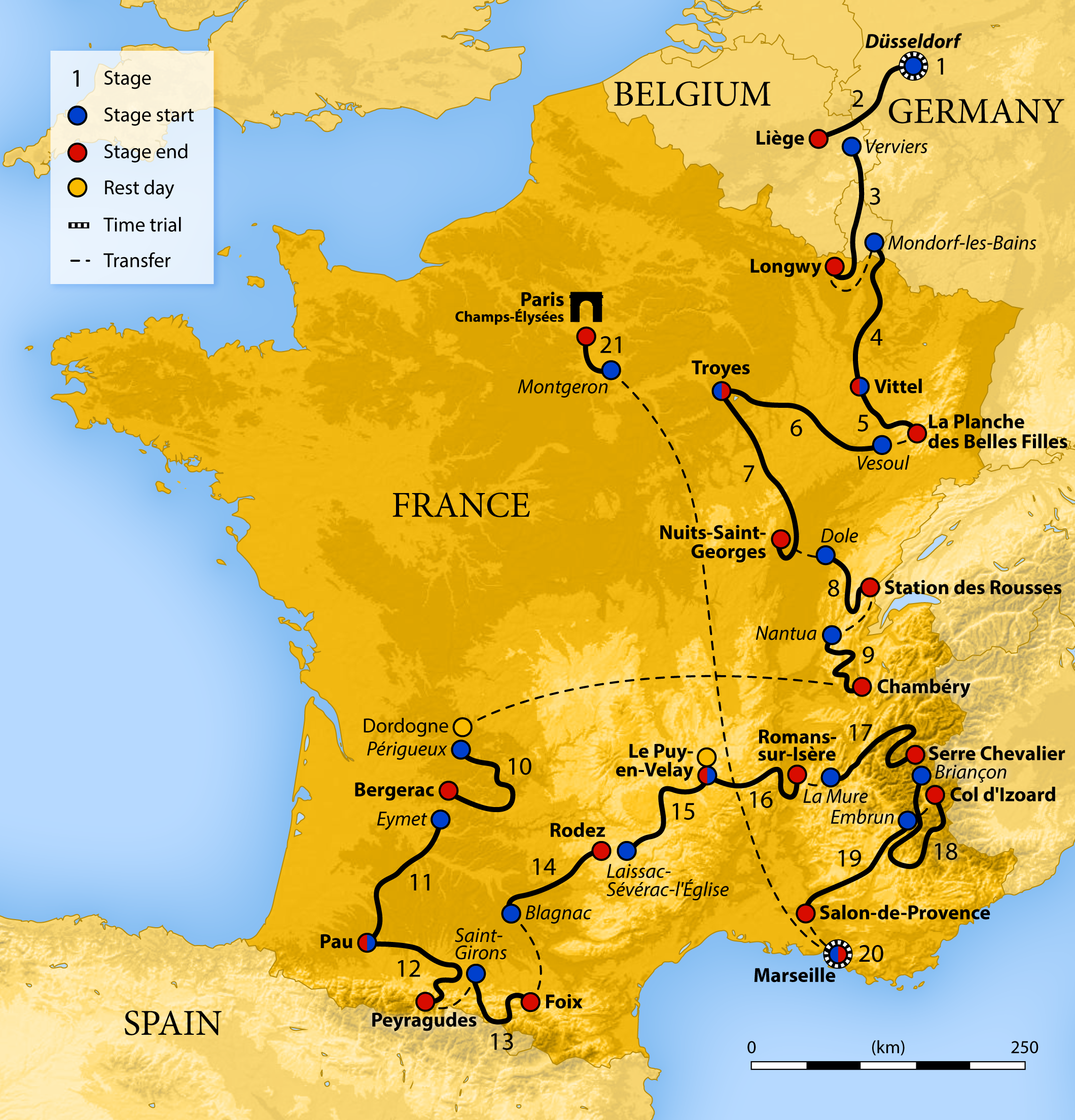
Route of the 2017 Tour de France

The 2017 Tour de France is the 104th edition of the cycle race, one of cycling's Grand Tours. The race started in Düsseldorf, Germany on 1 July, with stage 12 occurring on 13 July with a stage departing from Pau. The race finished on the Champs-Élysées in Paris on 23 July.

== Classification standings ==
Legend
A yellow jersey.	Denotes the leader of the general classification	A white jersey with red polka dots.	Denotes the leader of the mountains classification
A green jersey.	Denotes the leader of the points classification	A white jersey.	Denotes the leader of the young rider classification
A white jersey with a yellow number bib.	Denotes the leader of the team classification	A white jersey with a red number bib.	Denotes the winner of the combativity award

== Stage 12 ==
13 July 2017 — Pau to Peyragudes, 214.5 km (133 mi)

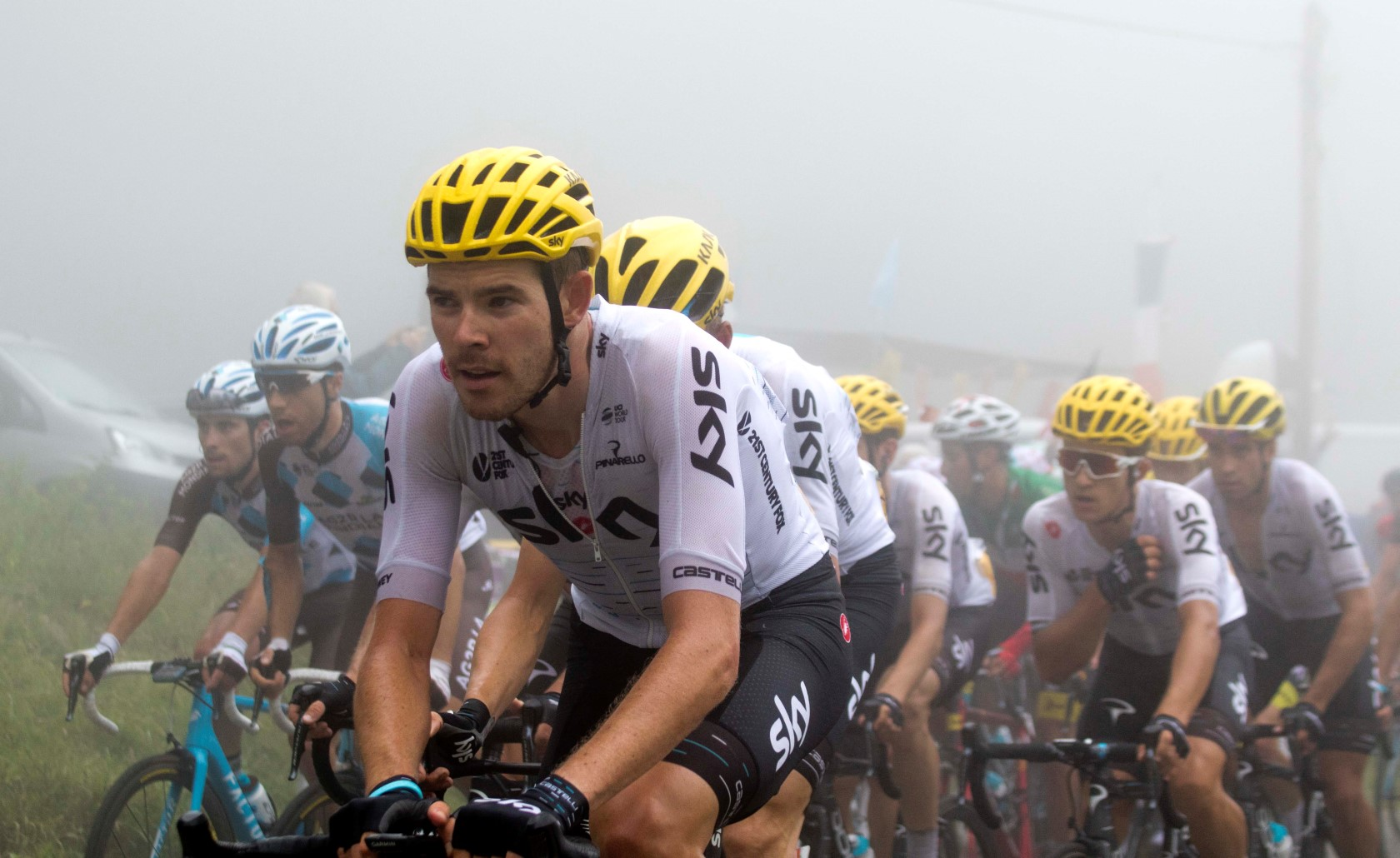
Luke Rowe at the head of the peloton on stage 12

This mountain stage departed east from Pau. With the race starting at Ousse, the peloton continued through Tarbes and headed southeast through Tournay, for the category 4 climb of the Côte de Capvern. Continuing east through La Barthe-de-Neste, the riders took a southeasterly direction from Aventignan, to an intermediate sprint at Loures-Barousse. The route then turned northeast from Fronsac, into the category 2 climb of the Col des Ares to 797 m (2,615 ft) which then descended to Sengouagnet. The riders then commenced ascending south, and then west, into the category 1 climb of the Col de Menté to 1,349 m (4,426 ft). After descending to Saint-Béat and continuing along the valley to Mauléon-Barousse, the race headed south into the 11.7 km (7.3 mi) climb of the Hors catégorie Port de Balès to 1,755 m (5,758 ft), descending to Saint-Aventin where the race turned west. The route continued into the 9.7 km (6 mi) category 1 climb of the Col de Peyresourde to 1,569 m (5,148 ft), with a brief partial descent before the category 2 climb to the finish line at Peyragudes.

Stage 12 result
Rank	Rider	Team	Time
1	Romain Bardet (FRA)	AG2R La Mondiale	5h 49' 38"
2	Rigoberto Urán (COL)	Cannondale–Drapac	+ 2"
3	Fabio Aru (ITA)	Astana	+ 2"
4	Mikel Landa (ESP)	Team Sky	+ 5"
5	Louis Meintjes (RSA)	UAE Team Emirates	+ 7"
6	Dan Martin (IRL)	Quick-Step Floors	+ 13"
7	Chris Froome (GBR)	Team Sky	+ 22"
8	George Bennett (NZL)	LottoNL–Jumbo	+ 27"
9	Simon Yates (GBR)	Orica–Scott	+ 27"
10	Mikel Nieve (ESP)	Team Sky	+ 1' 28"

General classification after Stage 12
Rank	Rider	Team	Time
1	Fabio Aru (ITA)	Astana	52h 51' 49"
2	Chris Froome (GBR)	Team Sky	+ 6"
3	Romain Bardet (FRA)	AG2R La Mondiale	+ 25"
4	Rigoberto Urán (COL)	Cannondale–Drapac	+ 35"
5	Dan Martin (IRL)	Quick-Step Floors	+ 1' 41"
6	Simon Yates (GBR)	Orica–Scott	+ 2' 13"
7	Mikel Landa (ESP)	Team Sky	+ 2' 55"
8	Nairo Quintana (COL)	Movistar Team	+ 4' 01"
9	George Bennett (NZL)	LottoNL–Jumbo	+ 4' 04"
10	Louis Meintjes (RSA)	UAE Team Emirates	+ 4' 51"

== Stage 13 ==
14 July 2017 — Saint-Girons to Foix, 101 km (63 mi)

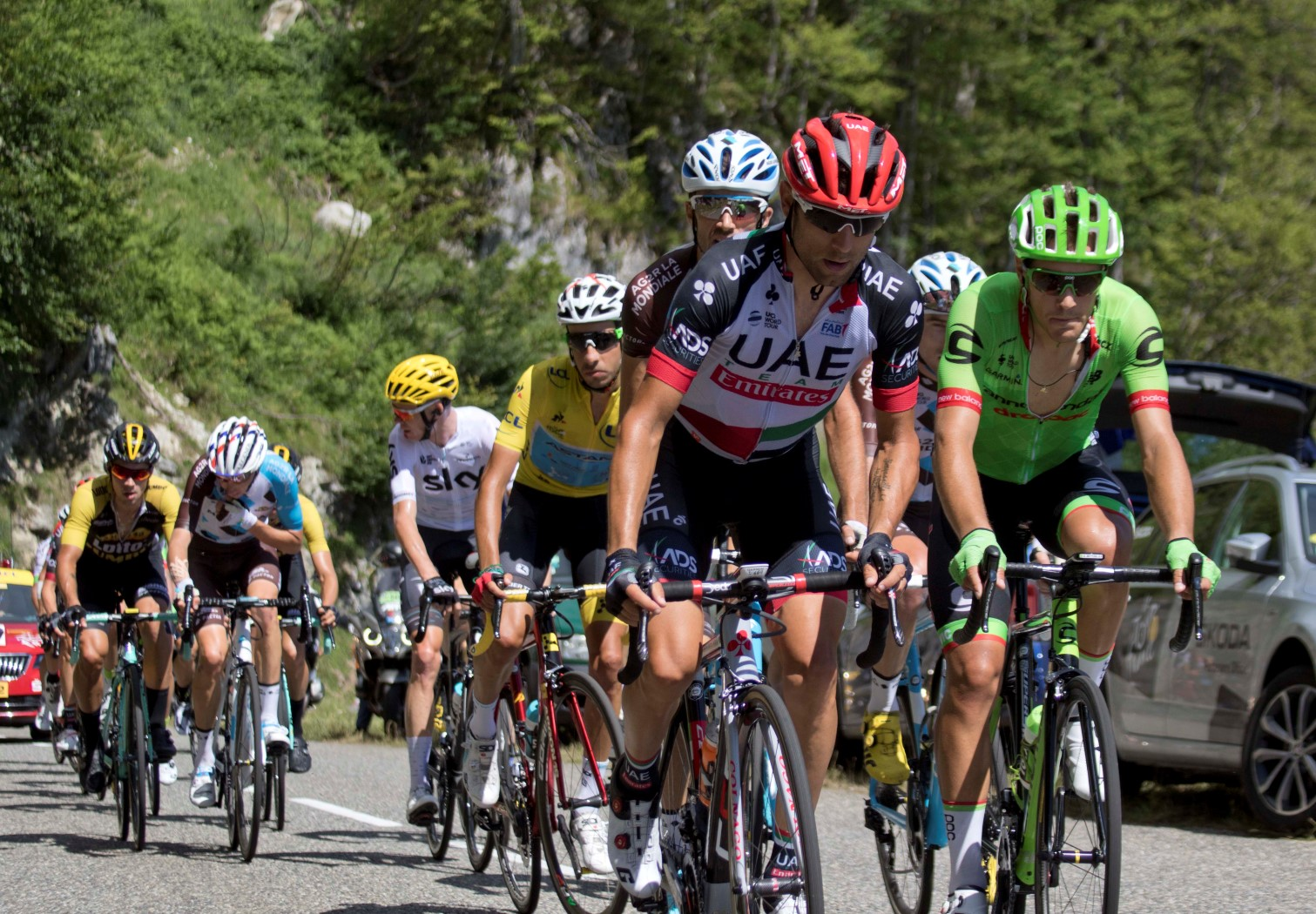
The yellow jersey group, climbing during stage 13

This mountain stage departed south-east from Saint-Girons. With the race starting outside Lacourt, the peloton continued south through Oust to an intermediate sprint at Seix. The peloton continued south and then south-east, through Ustou, to the category 1 climb of the Col de Latrape at 1,110 m (3,640 ft). After descending to Aulus-les-Bains, the riders commenced an ascent east and then north into the 10 km (6.2 mi) category 1 climb of the Col d'Agnes at 1,570 m (5,150 ft). The riders then took a long descent north to Massat to begin the route north-east into the 9.3 km (5.8 mi) category 1 climb of the Mur de Péguère at 1,375 m (4,511 ft). After a descent north-east through Burret, the race continued descending east through Saint-Pierre-de-Rivière, to the finish line at Foix.

On Bastille Day, Warren Barguil (Team Sunweb) achieved his first Tour de France stage victory; as a result, he became the first French rider to win on the national holiday since David Moncoutié's stage 12 victory, at Digne-les-Bains, in 2005.

Stage 13 result
Rank	Rider	Team	Time
1	Warren Barguil (FRA)	Team Sunweb	2h 36' 29"
2	Nairo Quintana (COL)	Movistar Team	+ 0"
3	Alberto Contador (ESP)	Trek–Segafredo	+ 0"
4	Mikel Landa (ESP)	Team Sky	+ 2"
5	Simon Yates (GBR)	Orica–Scott	+ 1' 39"
6	Dan Martin (IRL)	Quick-Step Floors	+ 1' 39"
7	Michał Kwiatkowski (POL)	Team Sky	+ 1' 48"
8	Chris Froome (GBR)	Team Sky	+ 1' 48"
9	Fabio Aru (ITA)	Astana	+ 1' 48"
10	Rigoberto Urán (COL)	Cannondale–Drapac	+ 1' 48"

General classification after Stage 13
Rank	Rider	Team	Time
1	Fabio Aru (ITA)	Astana	55h 30' 06"
2	Chris Froome (GBR)	Team Sky	+ 6"
3	Romain Bardet (FRA)	AG2R La Mondiale	+ 25"
4	Rigoberto Urán (COL)	Cannondale–Drapac	+ 35"
5	Mikel Landa (ESP)	Team Sky	+ 1' 09"
6	Dan Martin (IRL)	Quick-Step Floors	+ 1' 32"
7	Simon Yates (GBR)	Orica–Scott	+ 2' 04"
8	Nairo Quintana (COL)	Movistar Team	+ 2' 07"
9	Louis Meintjes (RSA)	UAE Team Emirates	+ 4' 51"
10	Alberto Contador (ESP)	Trek–Segafredo	+ 5' 22"

== Stage 14 ==
15 July 2017 — Blagnac to Rodez, 181.5 km (113 mi)

This hilly stage departed north-west from Blagnac. With the race starting outside Seilh, the peloton continued through Grenade before turning east. After heading through Castelnau-d'Estrétefonds, Villariès and Bessières, an intermediate sprint took place at Rabastens. Continuing north-east through Gaillac and Carmaux, the riders then faced the category 3 climb of the Côte du viaduc du Viaur. Following a false flat and a brief descent was the category 3 Côte de Centrès. The race continued on an undulating route west and then north to a short, steep uphill finish in Rodez.

Stage 14 result
Rank	Rider	Team	Time
1	Michael Matthews (AUS)	Team Sunweb	4h 21' 56"
2	Greg Van Avermaet (BEL)	BMC Racing Team	+ 0"
3	Edvald Boasson Hagen (NOR)	Team Dimension Data	+ 1"
4	Philippe Gilbert (BEL)	Quick-Step Floors	+ 1"
5	Jay McCarthy (AUS)	Bora–Hansgrohe	+ 1"
6	Sonny Colbrelli (ITA)	Bahrain–Merida	+ 1"
7	Chris Froome (GBR)	Team Sky	+ 1"
8	Dan Martin (IRL)	Quick-Step Floors	+ 1"
9	Rigoberto Urán (COL)	Cannondale–Drapac	+ 1"
10	Tiesj Benoot (BEL)	Lotto–Soudal	+ 5"

General classification after Stage 14
Rank	Rider	Team	Time
1	Chris Froome (GBR)	Team Sky	59h 52' 09"
2	Fabio Aru (ITA)	Astana	+ 18"
3	Romain Bardet (FRA)	AG2R La Mondiale	+ 23"
4	Rigoberto Urán (COL)	Cannondale–Drapac	+ 29"
5	Mikel Landa (ESP)	Team Sky	+ 1' 17"
6	Dan Martin (IRL)	Quick-Step Floors	+ 1' 26"
7	Simon Yates (GBR)	Orica–Scott	+ 2' 02"
8	Nairo Quintana (COL)	Movistar Team	+ 2' 22"
9	Louis Meintjes (RSA)	UAE Team Emirates	+ 5' 09"
10	Alberto Contador (ESP)	Trek–Segafredo	+ 5' 37"

== Stage 15 ==
16 July 2017 — Laissac-Sévérac-l'Église to Le Puy-en-Velay, 189.5 km (118 mi)

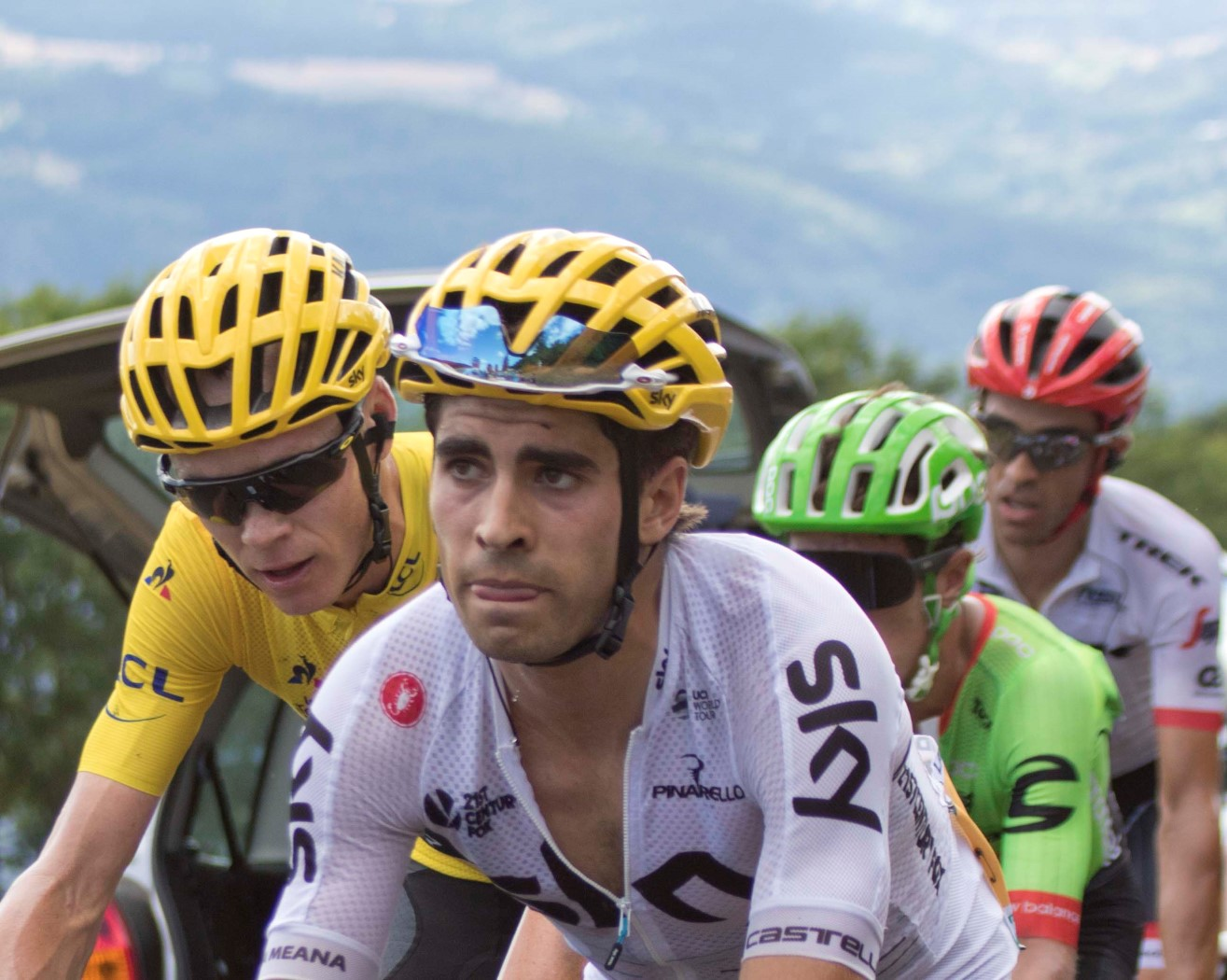
Mikel Landa, with Froome in the yellow jersey, during stage 15

This hilly stage departed north-east from Laissac-Sévérac-l'Église, with racing starting in the vicinity of Palmas-d'Aveyron. The peloton continued through Saint-Geniez-d'Olt-et-d'Aubrac into the 8.9 km (5.5 mi) category 1 climb of the Montée de Naves d’Aubrac to 1,058 m (3,471 ft). The route then plateaued, before continuing into the category 3 Côte de Vieurals to 1,358 m (4,455 ft). The race then continued north-west, and then north-east through Nasbinals and Malbouzon. After passing through Rimeize, there was an intermediate sprint at Saint-Alban-sur-Limagnole, followed by an uncategorised climb for approximately 10 km (6.2 mi). The riders then gradually descended through Esplantas-Vazeilles and north to Saint-Arcons-d'Allier, where the route turned east to the valley floor at Prades. From here, the race immediately commenced the ascent of the 8.3 km (5.2 mi) category 1 Col de Peyra Taillade to 1,190 m (3,900 ft). The riders then descended through Chaspuzac, before the brief category 4 climb of the Côte de Saint-Vidal. The race continued descending, through Polignac, to the finish line in Le Puy-en-Velay.

Stage 15 result
Rank	Rider	Team	Time
1	Bauke Mollema (NED)	Trek–Segafredo	4h 41' 47"
2	Diego Ulissi (ITA)	UAE Team Emirates	+ 19"
3	Tony Gallopin (FRA)	Lotto–Soudal	+ 19"
4	Primož Roglič (SLO)	LottoNL–Jumbo	+ 19"
5	Warren Barguil (FRA)	Team Sunweb	+ 23"
6	Nicolas Roche (IRL)	BMC Racing Team	+ 1' 00"
7	Lilian Calmejane (FRA)	Direct Énergie	+ 1' 04"
8	Jan Bakelants (BEL)	AG2R La Mondiale	+ 1' 04"
9	Thibaut Pinot (FRA)	FDJ	+ 1' 04"
10	Serge Pauwels (BEL)	Team Dimension Data	+ 1' 04"

General classification after Stage 15
Rank	Rider	Team	Time
1	Chris Froome (GBR)	Team Sky	64h 40' 21"
2	Fabio Aru (ITA)	Astana	+ 18"
3	Romain Bardet (FRA)	AG2R La Mondiale	+ 23"
4	Rigoberto Urán (COL)	Cannondale–Drapac	+ 29"
5	Dan Martin (IRL)	Quick-Step Floors	+ 1' 12"
6	Mikel Landa (ESP)	Team Sky	+ 1' 17"
7	Simon Yates (GBR)	Orica–Scott	+ 2' 02"
8	Louis Meintjes (RSA)	UAE Team Emirates	+ 5' 09"
9	Alberto Contador (ESP)	Trek–Segafredo	+ 5' 37"
10	Damiano Caruso (ITA)	BMC Racing Team	+ 6' 05"

== Rest day 2 ==
17 July 2017 — Le Puy-en-Velay

== Stage 16 ==
18 July 2017 — Le Puy-en-Velay to Romans-sur-Isère, 165 km (103 mi)

This hilly-to-flat stage departed east, ascending from Le Puy-en-Velay, with racing starting after passing through Brives-Charensac. The riders continued through Saint-Julien-Chapteuil, before reaching the undulating plateau after the category 3 Côte de Boussoulet at 1,204 m (3,950 ft). The race then partially descended into Le Chambon-sur-Lignon and reascended into Devesset, where the race turned north-east to Saint-Bonnet-le-Froid. Continuing east into the category 4 Col du Rouvey at 1,250 m (4,100 ft), the riders then completed a full descent, south-east through Lalouvesc and Saint-Félicien to Tournon-sur-Rhône. After crossing the Rhône into Tain-l'Hermitage, the race then turned north-east to an intermediate sprint at Chantemerle-les-Blés, before eventually turning south-east for Bren. Once through the outskirts of Saint-Donat-sur-l'Herbasse, the route turned south to Châteauneuf-sur-Isère and then south-east to Alixan. From there, the race headed north, through Bourg-de-Péage, to the finish line at Romans-sur-Isère.

Stage 16 result
Rank	Rider	Team	Time
1	Michael Matthews (AUS)	Team Sunweb	3h 38' 15"
2	Edvald Boasson Hagen (NOR)	Team Dimension Data	+ 0"
3	John Degenkolb (GER)	Trek–Segafredo	+ 0"
4	Greg Van Avermaet (BEL)	BMC Racing Team	+ 0"
5	Christophe Laporte (FRA)	Cofidis	+ 0"
6	Jens Keukeleire (BEL)	Orica–Scott	+ 0"
7	Tony Gallopin (FRA)	Lotto–Soudal	+ 0"
8	Tiesj Benoot (BEL)	Lotto–Soudal	+ 0"
9	Maciej Bodnar (POL)	Bora–Hansgrohe	+ 0"
10	Romain Hardy (FRA)	Fortuneo–Oscaro	+ 0"

General classification after Stage 16
Rank	Rider	Team	Time
1	Chris Froome (GBR)	Team Sky	68h 18' 36"
2	Fabio Aru (ITA)	Astana	+ 18"
3	Romain Bardet (FRA)	AG2R La Mondiale	+ 23"
4	Rigoberto Urán (COL)	Cannondale–Drapac	+ 29"
5	Mikel Landa (ESP)	Team Sky	+ 1' 17"
6	Simon Yates (GBR)	Orica–Scott	+ 2' 02"
7	Dan Martin (IRL)	Quick-Step Floors	+ 2' 03"
8	Louis Meintjes (RSA)	UAE Team Emirates	+ 6' 00"
9	Damiano Caruso (ITA)	BMC Racing Team	+ 6' 05"
10	Nairo Quintana (COL)	Movistar Team	+ 6' 16"

== Stage 17 ==
19 July 2017 — La Mure to Serre Chevalier, 183 km (114 mi)

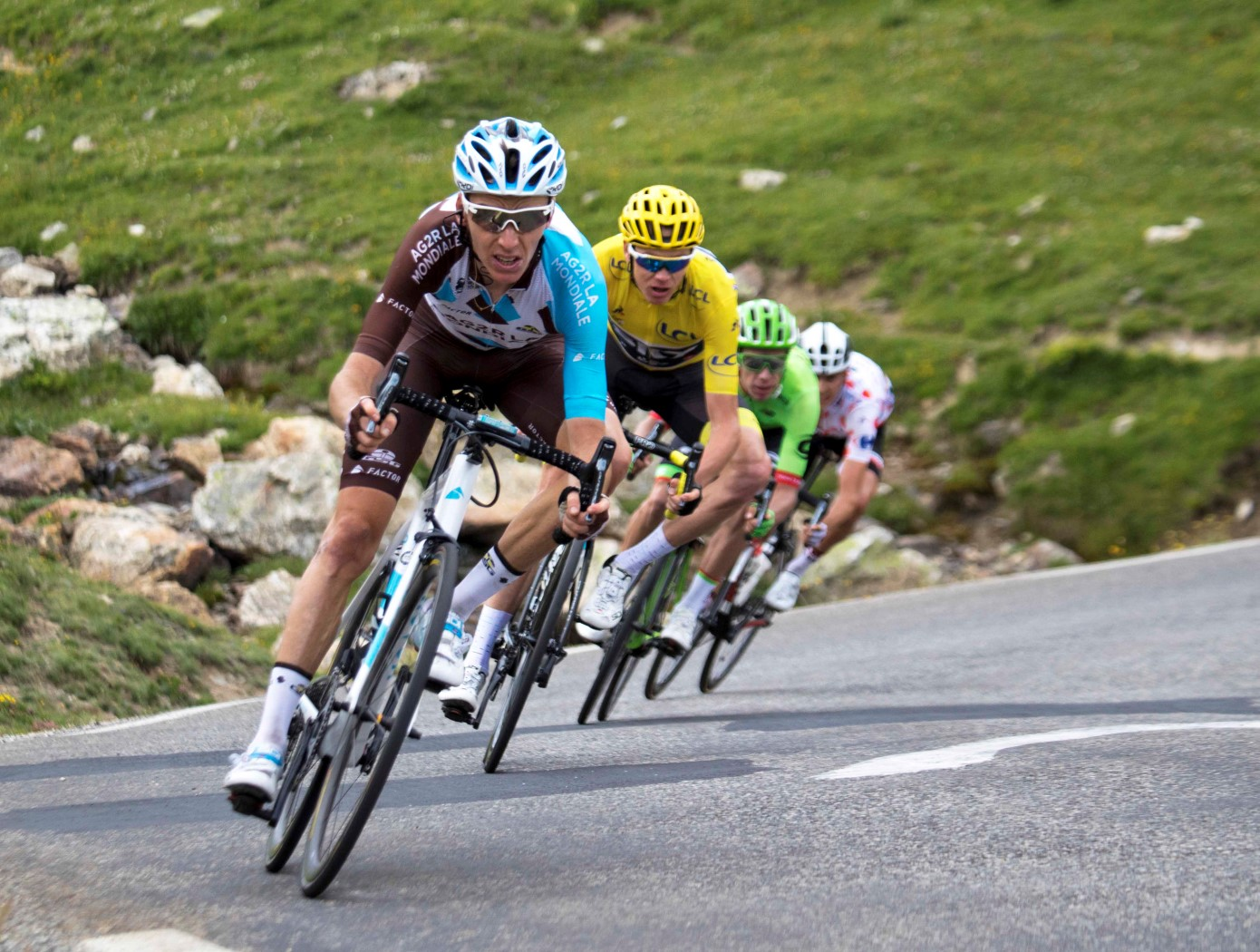
Bardet leading Froome, Urán and Barguil on a descent during stage 17

This mountain stage departed east from La Mure. With racing starting at Sousville, the peloton continued through Valbonnais before turning north at Entraigues. The riders then headed into the category 2 climb of the Col d'Ornon at 1,371 m (4,498 ft), and then descended to an intermediate sprint at Allemont. The race continued climbing north and then east, into the 24 km (15 mi) Hors catégorie climb of the Col de la Croix de Fer at 2,067 m (6,781 ft). After descending east and then north to Saint-Jean-de-Maurienne, the riders continued in the valley south-east to Saint-Michel-de-Maurienne. The race then went south-west into the 11.9 km (7.4 mi) category 1 ascent of the Col du Télégraphe at 1,566 m (5,138 ft), with a partial descent south to Valloire. The route then immediately ascended into the 17.7 km (11 mi) Hors catégorie Col du Galibier, for the Souvenir Henri Desgrange. The riders then descended south-east through the uncategorised Col du Lautaret, and Le Monêtier-les-Bains, to the finish line at Serre Chevalier.

Stage 17 result
Rank	Rider	Team	Time
1	Primož Roglič (SLO)	LottoNL–Jumbo	5h 07' 41"
2	Rigoberto Urán (COL)	Cannondale–Drapac	+ 1' 13"
3	Chris Froome (GBR)	Team Sky	+ 1' 13"
4	Romain Bardet (FRA)	AG2R La Mondiale	+ 1' 13"
5	Warren Barguil (FRA)	Team Sunweb	+ 1' 13"
6	Mikel Landa (ESP)	Team Sky	+ 1' 16"
7	Dan Martin (IRL)	Quick-Step Floors	+ 1' 43"
8	Alberto Contador (ESP)	Trek–Segafredo	+ 1' 44"
9	Louis Meintjes (RSA)	UAE Team Emirates	+ 1' 44"
10	Fabio Aru (ITA)	Astana	+ 1' 44"

General classification after Stage 17
Rank	Rider	Team	Time
1	Chris Froome (GBR)	Team Sky	73h 27' 26"
2	Rigoberto Urán (COL)	Cannondale–Drapac	+ 27"
3	Romain Bardet (FRA)	AG2R La Mondiale	+ 27"
4	Fabio Aru (ITA)	Astana	+ 53"
5	Mikel Landa (ESP)	Team Sky	+ 1' 24"
6	Dan Martin (IRL)	Quick-Step Floors	+ 2' 37"
7	Simon Yates (GBR)	Orica–Scott	+ 4' 07"
8	Louis Meintjes (RSA)	UAE Team Emirates	+ 6' 35"
9	Alberto Contador (ESP)	Trek–Segafredo	+ 7' 45"
10	Warren Barguil (FRA)	Team Sunweb	+ 8' 52"

== Stage 18 ==
20 July 2017 — Briançon to Col d'Izoard, 179.5 km (112 mi)

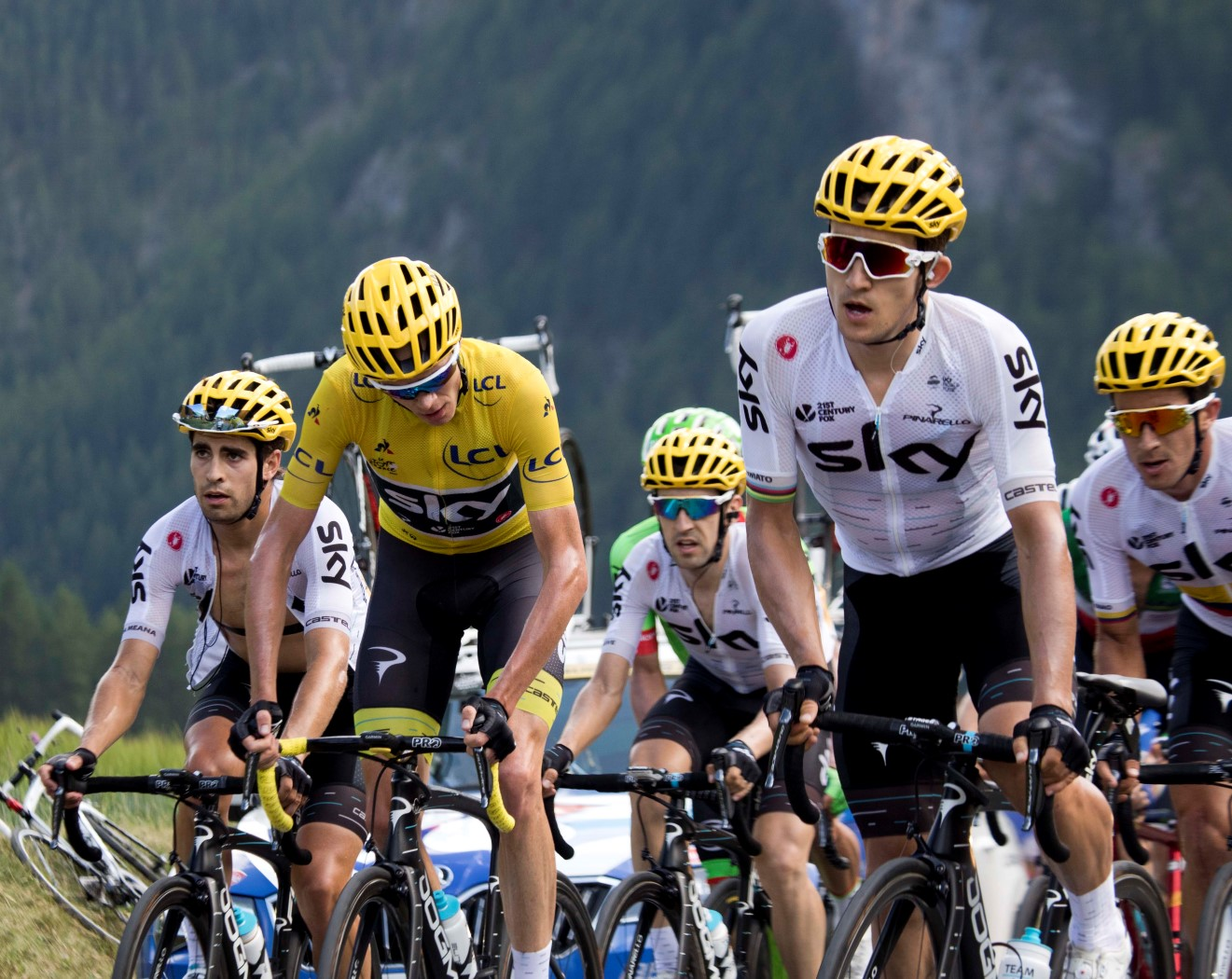
The Sky team, at the head of the peloton, on stage 18

This mountain stage departed south-west from Briançon, with racing starting approximately halfway to Saint-Martin-de-Queyrières. The peloton continued south through L'Argentière-la-Bessée and Saint-Clément-sur-Durance, and south-west through Embrun and Savines-le-Lac to the category 3 Côte des Demoiselles Coiffées. The race continued to Le Sauze-du-Lac before turning south-east towards Le Lauzet-Ubaye, and then heading east to an intermediate sprint at Les Thuiles. After passing through Barcelonnette and Jausiers, the riders turned north for Saint-Paul-sur-Ubaye, and then the 9.3 km (5.8 mi) category 1 ascent of the Col de Vars, from where the race descended north to Guillestre. The riders then began gradually ascending again, continuing north-east through Arvieux. The route continued north with a 14.7 km (9.1 mi) climb to the finish line on the Hors catégorie Col d'Izoard. This was the first stage finish on the Col d'Izoard in Tour history.

Stage 18 result
Rank	Rider	Team	Time
1	Warren Barguil (FRA)	Team Sunweb	4h 40' 33"
2	Darwin Atapuma (COL)	UAE Team Emirates	+ 20"
3	Romain Bardet (FRA)	AG2R La Mondiale	+ 20"
4	Chris Froome (GBR)	Team Sky	+ 20"
5	Rigoberto Urán (COL)	Cannondale–Drapac	+ 22"
6	Mikel Landa (ESP)	Team Sky	+ 32"
7	Louis Meintjes (RSA)	UAE Team Emirates	+ 37"
8	Dan Martin (IRL)	Quick-Step Floors	+ 39"
9	Simon Yates (GBR)	Orica–Scott	+ 59"
10	Alberto Contador (ESP)	Trek–Segafredo	+ 1' 09"

General classification after Stage 18
Rank	Rider	Team	Time
1	Chris Froome (GBR)	Team Sky	78h 08' 19"
2	Romain Bardet (FRA)	AG2R La Mondiale	+ 23"
3	Rigoberto Urán (COL)	Cannondale–Drapac	+ 29"
4	Mikel Landa (ESP)	Team Sky	+ 1' 36"
5	Fabio Aru (ITA)	Astana	+ 1' 55"
6	Dan Martin (IRL)	Quick-Step Floors	+ 2' 56"
7	Simon Yates (GBR)	Orica–Scott	+ 4' 46"
8	Louis Meintjes (RSA)	UAE Team Emirates	+ 6' 52"
9	Warren Barguil (FRA)	Team Sunweb	+ 8' 22"
10	Alberto Contador (ESP)	Trek–Segafredo	+ 8' 34"

== Stage 19 ==
21 July 2017 — Embrun to Salon-de-Provence, 222.5 km (138 mi)

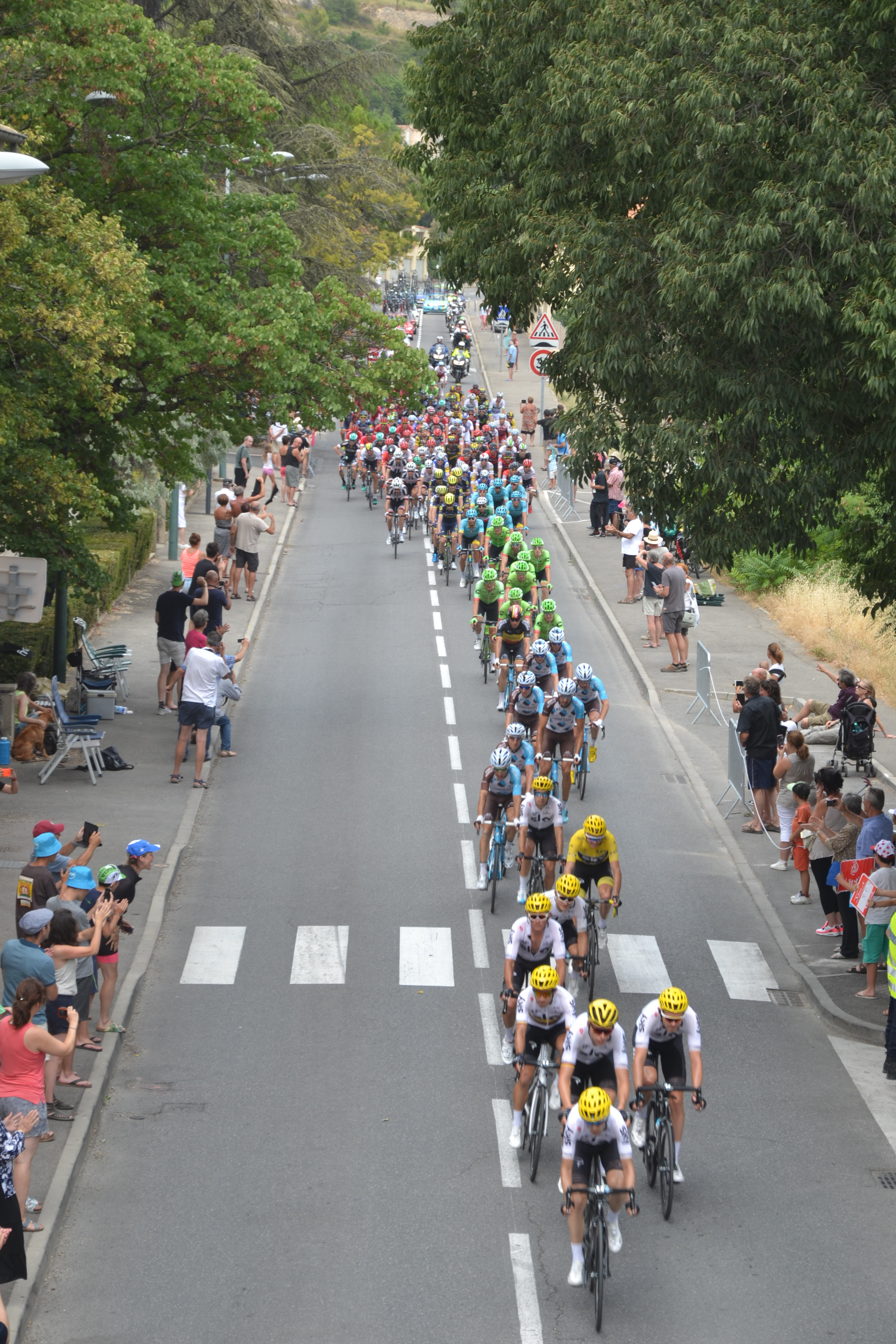
The peloton passing through Apt on stage 19

This undulating stage departed west from Embrun, heading through Chorges and turning south. Following the category 3 Col Lebraut, the race descended south-west into Espinasses and immediately ascended into the category 3 Côte de Bréziers, continuing into the uncategorised Col de Sarraut. After gently descending through La Motte-du-Caire to Sisteron, the route rose towards Saint-Étienne-les-Orgues, where the race took a winding route west for an intermediate sprint at Banon. From there, the race descended south-west through Apt, and turned south to the category 3 Col du Pointu. The riders descended to Lourmarin and turned west for Mérindol. After continuing south-west to Lamanon, the race headed south to the finish line at Salon-de-Provence.

Stage 19 result
Rank	Rider	Team	Time
1	Edvald Boasson Hagen (NOR)	Team Dimension Data	5h 06' 09"
2	Nikias Arndt (GER)	Team Sunweb	+ 5"
3	Jens Keukeleire (BEL)	Orica–Scott	+ 17"
4	Daniele Bennati (ITA)	Movistar Team	+ 17"
5	Thomas De Gendt (BEL)	Lotto–Soudal	+ 17"
6	Sylvain Chavanel (FRA)	Direct Énergie	+ 17"
7	Élie Gesbert (FRA)	Fortuneo–Oscaro	+ 17"
8	Jan Bakelants (BEL)	AG2R La Mondiale	+ 17"
9	Michael Albasini (SWI)	Orica–Scott	+ 19"
10	Pierre-Luc Périchon (FRA)	Fortuneo–Oscaro	+ 1' 32"

General classification after Stage 19
Rank	Rider	Team	Time
1	Chris Froome (GBR)	Team Sky	83h 26' 55"
2	Romain Bardet (FRA)	AG2R La Mondiale	+ 23"
3	Rigoberto Urán (COL)	Cannondale–Drapac	+ 29"
4	Mikel Landa (ESP)	Team Sky	+ 1' 36"
5	Fabio Aru (ITA)	Astana	+ 1' 55"
6	Dan Martin (IRL)	Quick-Step Floors	+ 2' 56"
7	Simon Yates (GBR)	Orica–Scott	+ 4' 46"
8	Louis Meintjes (RSA)	UAE Team Emirates	+ 6' 52"
9	Warren Barguil (FRA)	Team Sunweb	+ 8' 22"
10	Alberto Contador (ESP)	Trek–Segafredo	+ 8' 34"

== Stage 20 ==
22 July 2017 — Marseille to Marseille, 22.5 km (14 mi), individual time trial (ITT)

The final individual time trial departed from inside the Stade Vélodrome, with the riders heading along the Boulevard Michelet and Avenue du Prado towards the Plage du Prado. After a brief journey south alongside the Marseille Borely Racecourse, the route then doubled back, following the coast north along the Corniche du Président-John-Fitzgerald-Kennedy, to the first time check at the Palais du Pharo. Continuing around the Old Port of Marseille to the Museum of European and Mediterranean Civilisations, the riders again doubled back. The route then took the other side of the road around the Old Port before heading inland, with a 1.2 km (0.75 mi) climb, to the second time check at Notre-Dame de la Garde. The riders then faced a winding descent back to the Corniche du Président-John-Fitzgerald-Kennedy, before taking the Avenue du Prado and Boulevard Michelet back to the finish line inside the stadium.

Stage 20 result
Rank	Rider	Team	Time
1	Maciej Bodnar (POL)	Bora–Hansgrohe	28' 15"
2	Michał Kwiatkowski (POL)	Team Sky	+ 1"
3	Chris Froome (GBR)	Team Sky	+ 6"
4	Tony Martin (GER)	Team Katusha–Alpecin	+ 14"
5	Daryl Impey (RSA)	Orica–Scott	+ 20"
6	Alberto Contador (ESP)	Trek–Segafredo	+ 21"
7	Nikias Arndt (GER)	Team Sunweb	+ 28"
8	Rigoberto Urán (COL)	Cannondale–Drapac	+ 31"
9	Stefan Küng (SUI)	BMC Racing Team	+ 34"
10	Sylvain Chavanel (FRA)	Direct Énergie	+ 37"

General classification after Stage 20
Rank	Rider	Team	Time
1	Chris Froome (GBR)	Team Sky	83h 55' 16"
2	Rigoberto Urán (COL)	Cannondale–Drapac	+ 54"
3	Romain Bardet (FRA)	AG2R La Mondiale	+ 2' 20"
4	Mikel Landa (ESP)	Team Sky	+ 2' 21"
5	Fabio Aru (ITA)	Astana	+ 3' 05"
6	Dan Martin (IRL)	Quick-Step Floors	+ 4' 42"
7	Simon Yates (GBR)	Orica–Scott	+ 6' 14"
8	Louis Meintjes (RSA)	UAE Team Emirates	+ 8' 20"
9	Alberto Contador (ESP)	Trek–Segafredo	+ 8' 49"
10	Warren Barguil (FRA)	Team Sunweb	+ 9' 25"

== Stage 21 ==
23 July 2017 — Montgeron to Paris Champs-Élysées, 103 km (64 mi)

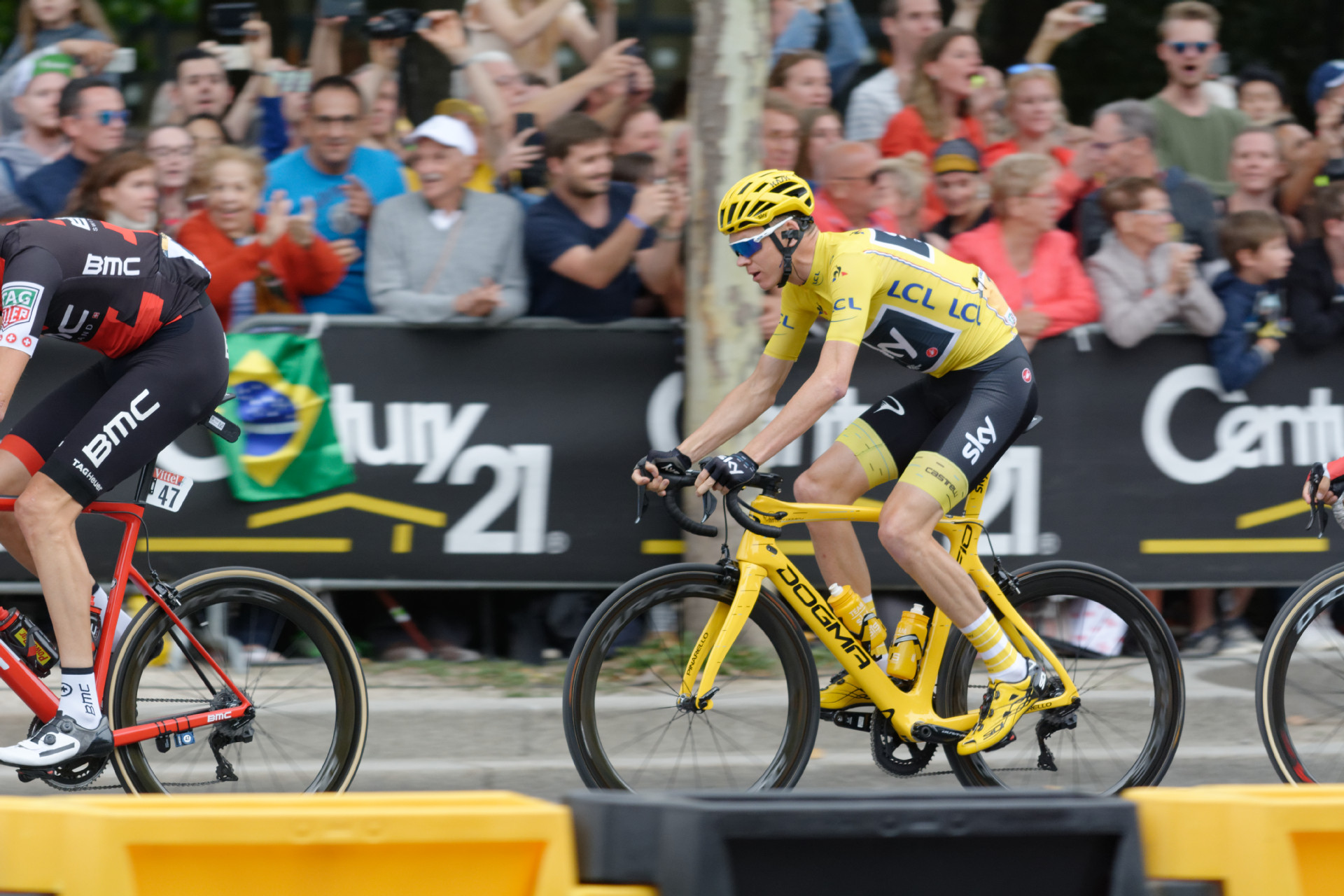
Froome wearing yellow in Paris, on the final stage

This flat stage departed north-west from Montgeron, with racing starting before reaching Villeneuve-Saint-Georges. After continuing west to Villeneuve-le-Roi, the peloton headed south-west to Villemoisson-sur-Orge and turned north-west. On reaching Longjumeau, the riders headed north to Montrouge, entered Paris at the Porte d'Orléans and turned west along the southern Boulevards of the Marshals. After crossing the Seine at the Pont du Garigliano, the race headed north along the Voie Georges-Pompidou, crossing back at the Pont des Invalides and quickly crossing for the final time at the Pont Alexandre III. After passing through the Grand Palais, the race then entered the Champs-Élysées. The riders then faced the circuit around the Tuileries Garden, through the Place de la Concorde and around the Arc de Triomphe. The race had an intermediate sprint after the third pass of the finish line, with the race ending after the ninth pass of the finish line.

Stage 21 result
Rank	Rider	Team	Time
1	Dylan Groenewegen (NED)	LottoNL–Jumbo	2h 25' 39"
2	André Greipel (GER)	Lotto–Soudal	+ 0"
3	Edvald Boasson Hagen (NOR)	Team Dimension Data	+ 0"
4	Nacer Bouhanni (FRA)	Cofidis	+ 0"
5	Alexander Kristoff (NOR)	Team Katusha–Alpecin	+ 0"
6	Borut Božič (SLO)	Bahrain–Merida	+ 0"
7	Davide Cimolai (ITA)	FDJ	+ 0"
8	Pierre-Luc Périchon (FRA)	Fortuneo–Oscaro	+ 0"
9	Rüdiger Selig (GER)	Bora–Hansgrohe	+ 0"
10	Daniele Bennati (ITA)	Movistar Team	+ 0"

Final general classification
Rank	Rider	Team	Time
1	Chris Froome (GBR)	Team Sky	86h 20' 55"
2	Rigoberto Urán (COL)	Cannondale–Drapac	+ 54"
3	Romain Bardet (FRA)	AG2R La Mondiale	+ 2' 20"
4	Mikel Landa (ESP)	Team Sky	+ 2' 21"
5	Fabio Aru (ITA)	Astana	+ 3' 05"
6	Dan Martin (IRL)	Quick-Step Floors	+ 4' 42"
7	Simon Yates (GBR)	Orica–Scott	+ 6' 14"
8	Louis Meintjes (RSA)	UAE Team Emirates	+ 8' 20"
9	Alberto Contador (ESP)	Trek–Segafredo	+ 8' 49"
10	Warren Barguil (FRA)	Team Sunweb	+ 9' 25"
