= Prunières =

Prunières is the name of several communes in France:

- Prunières, Hautes-Alpes
- Prunières, Isère
- Prunières, Lozère

== See also ==
- Henry Prunières (1886–1942), French musicologist
