= Prunières, Hautes-Alpes =

Prunières
- Commune
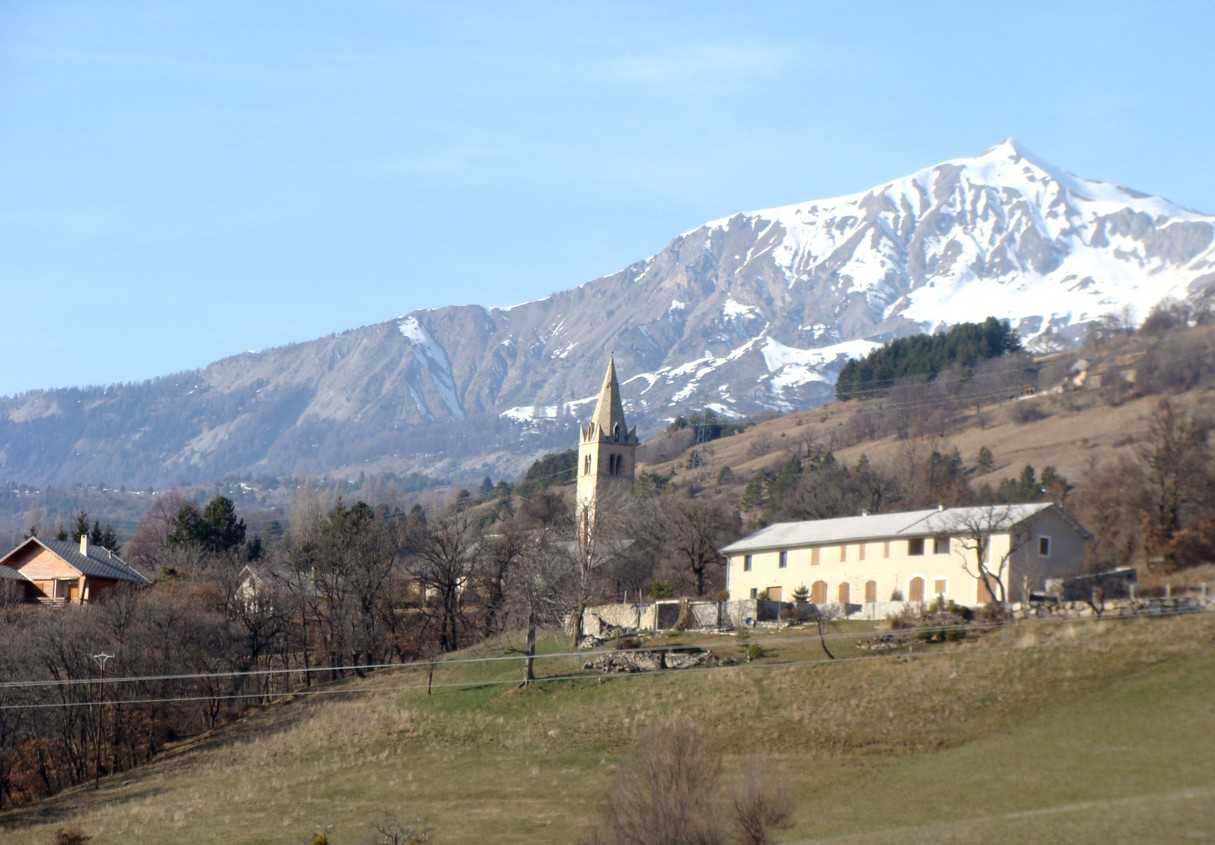
- The church and surrounding area, in Prunières

- Coat of arms
- Location of Prunières
- Location within France Location within Provence-Alpes-Côte d'Azur
- Coordinates: 44°32′34″N 6°20′03″E
- Country: France
- Region: Provence-Alpes-Côte d'Azur
- Department: Hautes-Alpes
- Arrondissement: Gap
- Canton: Chorges

Government
  - Mayor (2026–32): Jean-Luc Verrier
- Area^{1}: 13.2 km^{2} (5.1 sq mi)
- Elevation: 1,000 m (3,300 ft)
- Highest elevation: 2,390 m (7,840 ft)
- Lowest elevation: 770 m (2,530 ft)
- Population (2023): 318
  - Density: 24.1/km^{2} (62.4/sq mi)
- Time zone: UTC+01:00 (CET)
  - Summer (DST): UTC+02:00 (CEST)
- INSEE/Postal code: 05106 /05230
- ^{1} French Land Register data, which excludes lakes, ponds, glaciers > 1 km^{2} (0.386 sq mi or 247 acres) and river estuaries.

Prunières (French pronunciation: [pʁynjɛʁ]; Occitan: Prunieras) is a commune in the Hautes Alpes department in southeastern France.

== Geography ==
It is close to Chorges which is the closest commerce town. Bigger towns near Prunières include Gap (25 km) to the west or Embrun (15 km) to the east. Prunières is located close to the Lac de Serre-Ponçon, one of the largest artificial lakes in Western Europe, and surrounded by mountains.

== Population ==
Historical population
Year	Pop.	±% p.a.
1968	154	—
1975	121	−3.39%
1982	138	+1.90%
1990	175	+3.01%
1999	232	+3.18%
2007	283	+2.51%
2012	294	+0.77%
2017	298	+0.27%
2023	318	+1.09%
Source: INSEE

== Tourism ==
The main activity in the winter is skiing, while one can enjoy mountain climbing/hiking and water activities on the Lac de Serre-Ponçon.

== See also ==
- Communes of the Hautes-Alpes department
