= Théus =

- Commune
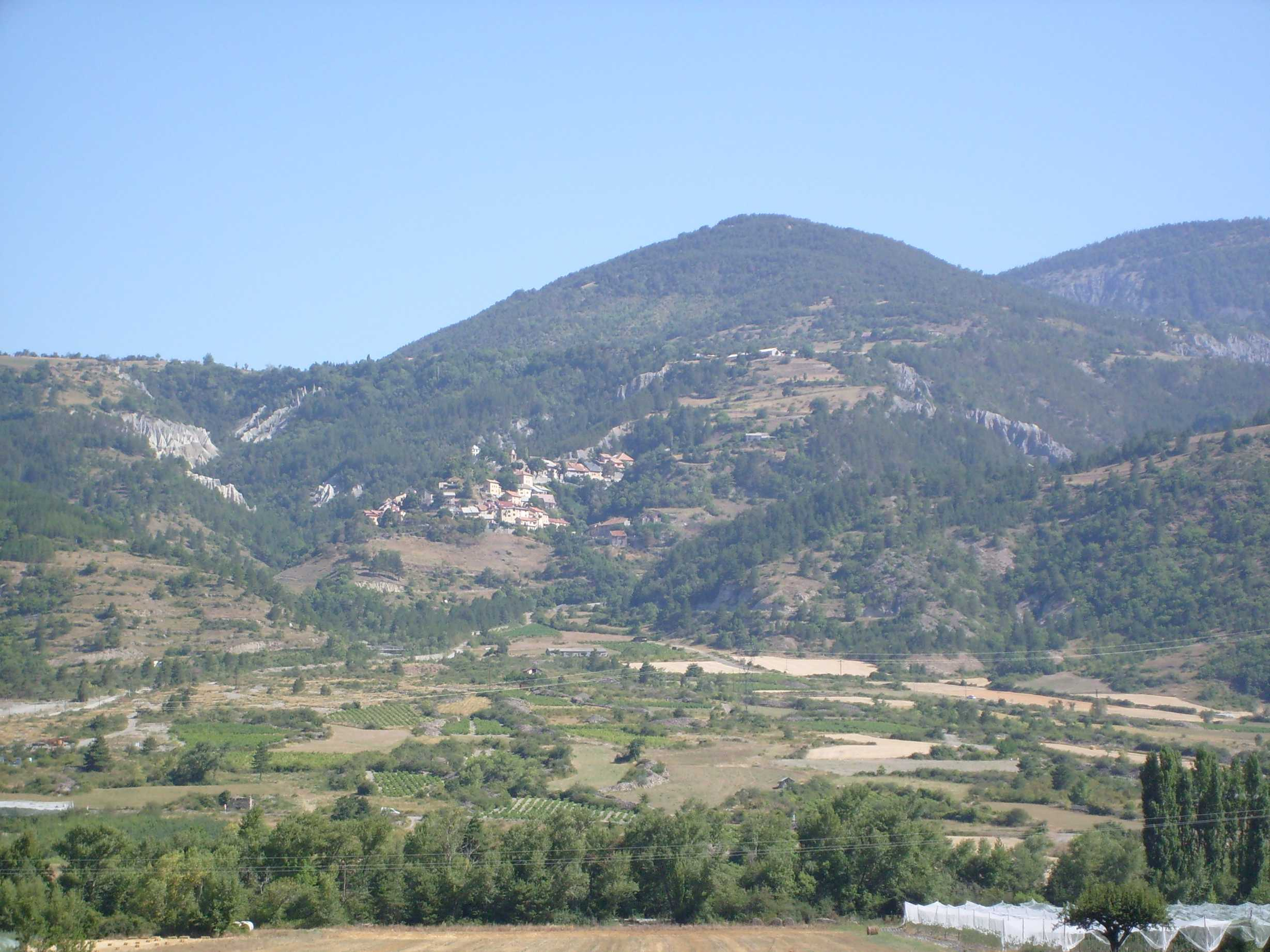
- A view over Théus village

- Coat of arms
- Location of Théus
- Location within France Location within Provence-Alpes-Côte d'Azur
- Coordinates: 44°28′38″N 6°11′21″E
- Country: France
- Region: Provence-Alpes-Côte d'Azur
- Department: Hautes-Alpes
- Arrondissement: Gap
- Canton: Chorges

Government
  - Mayor (2026–32): Cédric Bertochio
- Area^{1}: 16.71 km^{2} (6.45 sq mi)
- Elevation: 875 m (2,871 ft)
- Highest elevation: 1,732 m (5,682 ft)
- Lowest elevation: 635 m (2,083 ft)
- Population (2023): 232
  - Density: 13.9/km^{2} (36.0/sq mi)
- Time zone: UTC+01:00 (CET)
  - Summer (DST): UTC+02:00 (CEST)
- INSEE/Postal code: 05171 /05190
- ^{1} French Land Register data, which excludes lakes, ponds, glaciers > 1 km^{2} (0.386 sq mi or 247 acres) and river estuaries.

Théus is a commune in the Hautes-Alpes department in southeastern France.

== Population ==
Historical population
Year	Pop.	±% p.a.
1968	144	—
1975	132	−1.24%
1982	137	+0.53%
1990	140	+0.27%
1999	156	+1.21%
2007	175	+1.45%
2012	208	+3.52%
2017	200	−0.78%
2023	232	+2.50%
Source: INSEE

== See also ==
- Communes of the Hautes-Alpes department
