= Bréziers =

- Commune
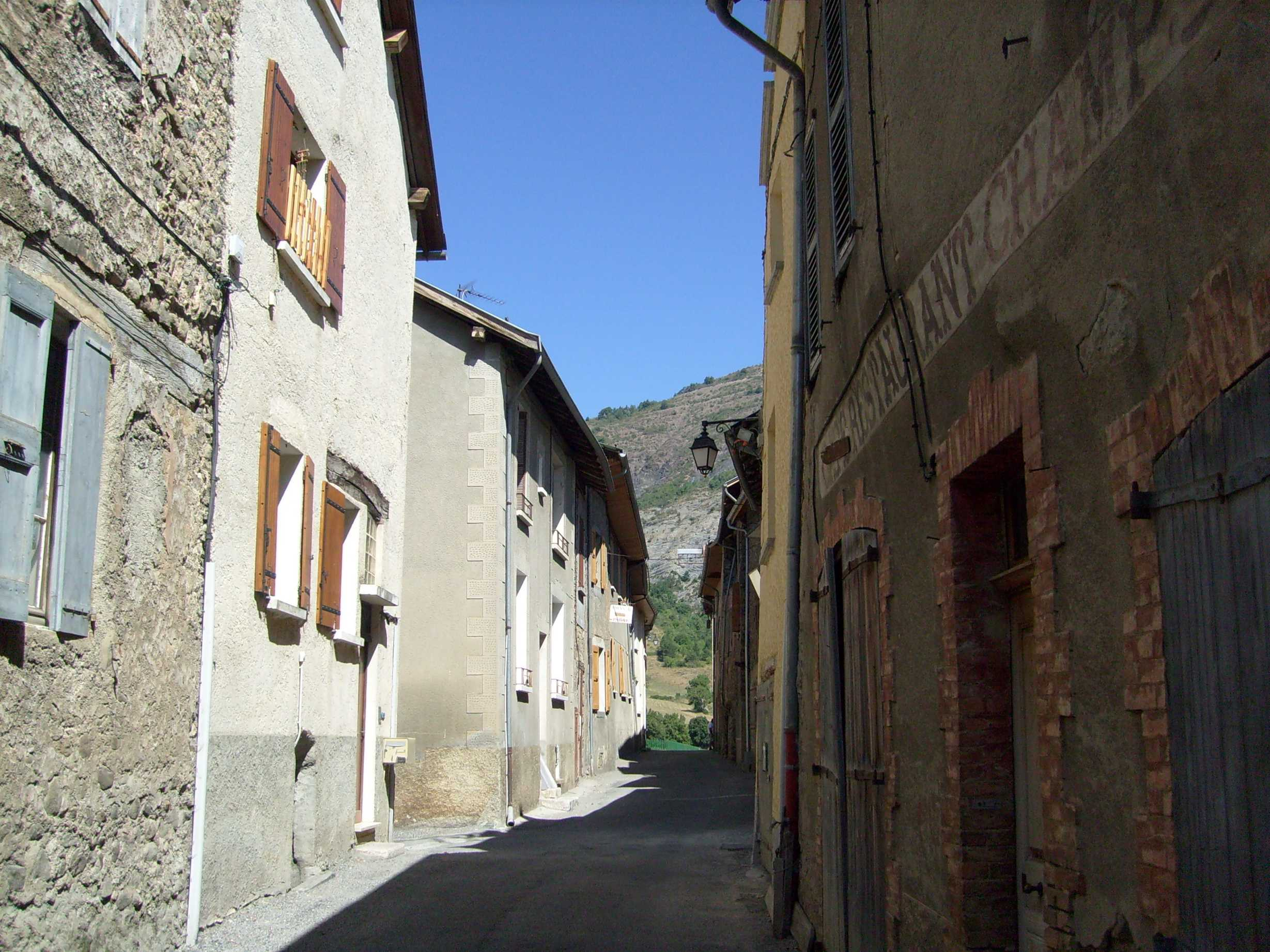
- A street in the village of Breziers

- Coat of arms
- Location of Bréziers
- Location within France Location within Provence-Alpes-Côte d'Azur
- Coordinates: 44°25′38″N 6°12′00″E
- Country: France
- Region: Provence-Alpes-Côte d'Azur
- Department: Hautes-Alpes
- Arrondissement: Gap
- Canton: Chorges
- Intercommunality: Serre-Ponçon Val d'Avance

Government
  - Mayor (2026–32): Dominique Dubois
- Area^{1}: 30.35 km^{2} (11.72 sq mi)
- Elevation: 815 m (2,674 ft)
- Highest elevation: 1,578 m (5,177 ft)
- Lowest elevation: 707 m (2,320 ft)
- Population (2023): 229
  - Density: 7.55/km^{2} (19.5/sq mi)
- Time zone: UTC+01:00 (CET)
  - Summer (DST): UTC+02:00 (CEST)
- INSEE/Postal code: 05022 /05190
- ^{1} French Land Register data, which excludes lakes, ponds, glaciers > 1 km^{2} (0.386 sq mi or 247 acres) and river estuaries.

Bréziers (French pronunciation: [bʁezje]; Occitan: Brezièrs) is a commune in the Hautes-Alpes department in southeastern France.

== Population ==
Historical population
Year	Pop.	±% p.a.
1968	225	—
1975	182	−2.98%
1982	156	−2.18%
1990	128	−2.44%
1999	124	−0.35%
2007	139	+1.44%
2012	201	+7.66%
2017	230	+2.73%
2023	229	−0.07%
Source: INSEE

== See also ==
- Communes of the Hautes-Alpes department
