= Le Sauze-du-Lac =

- Commune
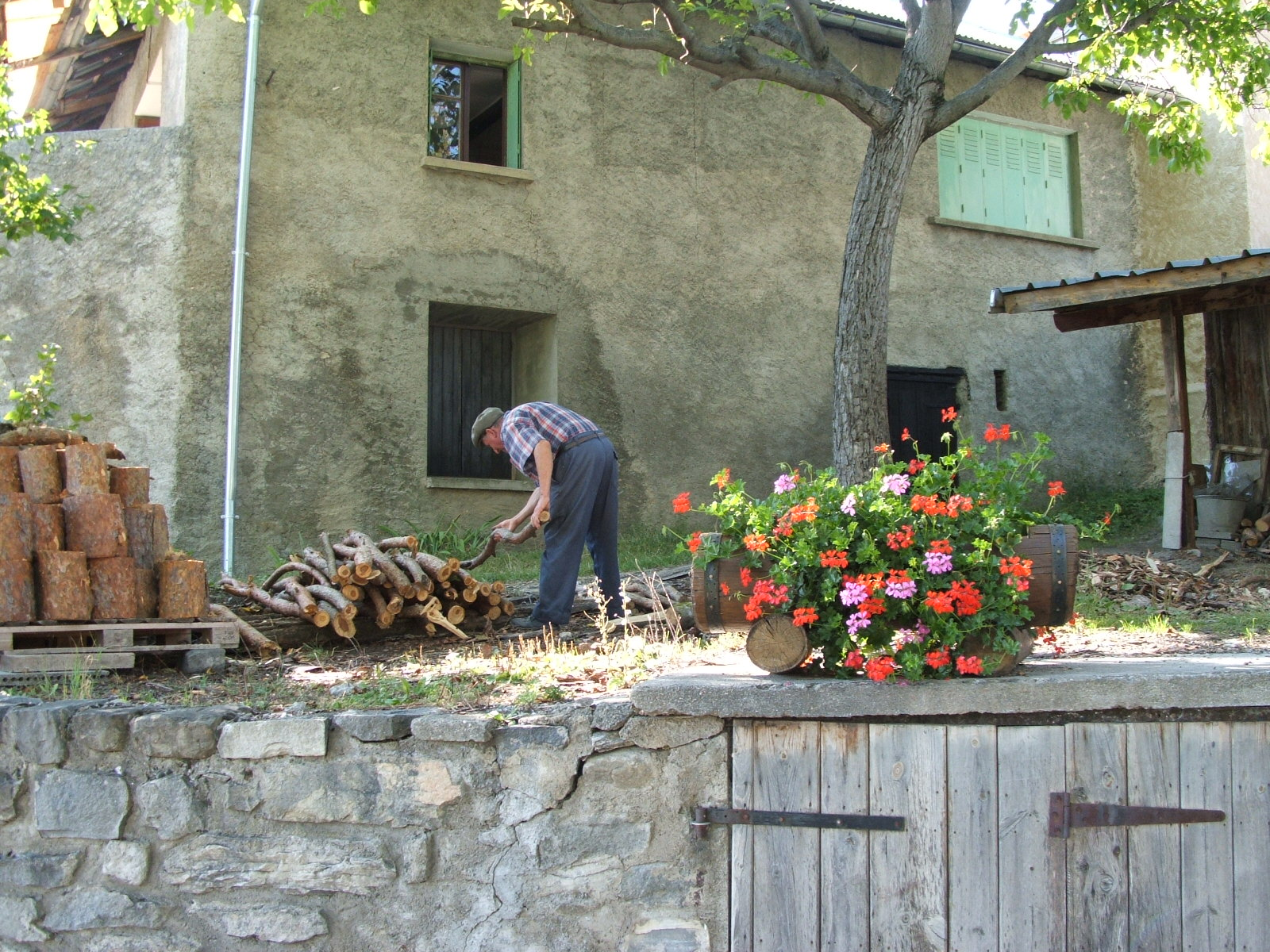
- A view within Le Sauze-du-Lac
- Location of Le Sauze-du-Lac
- Location within France Location within Provence-Alpes-Côte d'Azur
- Coordinates: 44°28′45″N 6°18′53″E
- Country: France
- Region: Provence-Alpes-Côte d'Azur
- Department: Hautes-Alpes
- Arrondissement: Gap
- Canton: Chorges

Government
  - Mayor (2026–32): Alain Bonhomme
- Area^{1}: 8.49 km^{2} (3.28 sq mi)
- Elevation: 1,052 m (3,451 ft)
- Highest elevation: 1,300 m (4,300 ft)
- Lowest elevation: 770 m (2,530 ft)
- Population (2023): 159
  - Density: 18.7/km^{2} (48.5/sq mi)
- Time zone: UTC+01:00 (CET)
  - Summer (DST): UTC+02:00 (CEST)
- INSEE/Postal code: 05163 /05160
- ^{1} French Land Register data, which excludes lakes, ponds, glaciers > 1 km^{2} (0.386 sq mi or 247 acres) and river estuaries.

Le Sauze-du-Lac (French pronunciation: [lə soz dy lak], literally Le Sauze of the Lake; Occitan: Lo Sause dau Lac, before 1991: Le Sauze) is a commune in the Hautes-Alpes department in southeastern France.

== Geography ==
Situated below the Pic du Morgon mountain, Le Sauze du Lac lies on a promontory sticking out between the two sides of the Lac de Serre-Ponçon. This used to be the meeting point, or confluence, of the Ubaye and Durance rivers. The village is located 9.1 km south east of Savines-le-Lac, and 20.6 km from the capital of the departement, Gap, Hautes-Alpes.

== Population ==
Historical population
Year	Pop.	±% p.a.
1968	72	—
1975	68	−0.81%
1982	55	−2.99%
1990	72	+3.42%
1999	87	+2.12%
2007	122	+4.32%
2012	139	+2.64%
2017	146	+0.99%
2023	159	+1.43%
Source: INSEE

== History ==
Le Sauze du Lac, previously just Le Sauze, is located above the Lac de Serre Poncon. The village was moved after its original site was flooded by the lake in the early 1960s.

== See also ==
- Communes of the Hautes-Alpes department
