= Rochebrune, Hautes-Alpes =

Rochebrune
- Commune
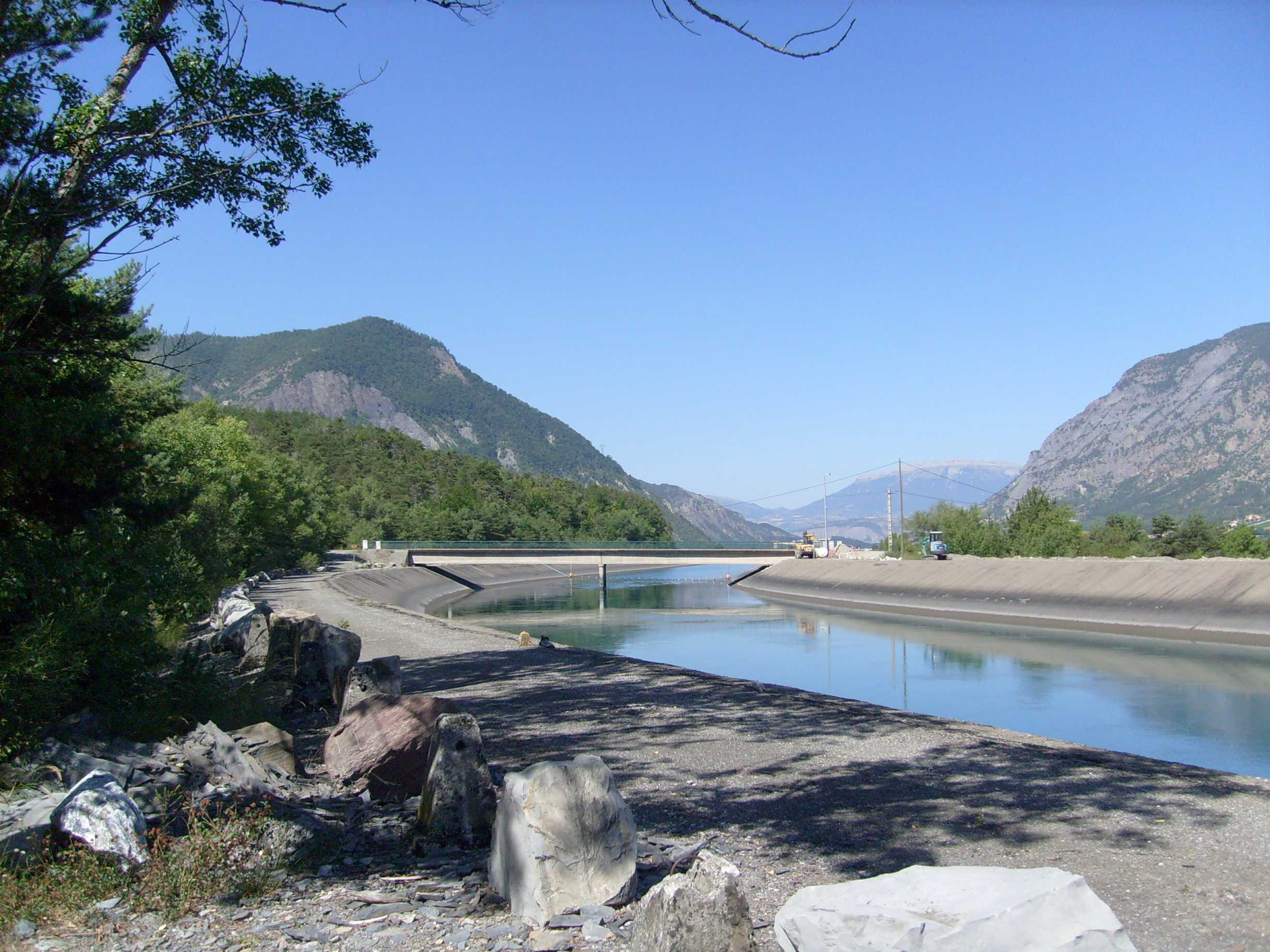
- Curban Canal

- Coat of arms
- Location of Rochebrune
- Location within France Location within Provence-Alpes-Côte d'Azur
- Coordinates: 44°27′25″N 6°10′39″E
- Country: France
- Region: Provence-Alpes-Côte d'Azur
- Department: Hautes-Alpes
- Arrondissement: Gap
- Canton: Chorges

Government
  - Mayor (2026–32): Daniel Aubin
- Area^{1}: 12.37 km^{2} (4.78 sq mi)
- Elevation: 600 m (2,000 ft)
- Highest elevation: 1,374 m (4,508 ft)
- Lowest elevation: 622 m (2,041 ft)
- Population (2023): 195
  - Density: 15.8/km^{2} (40.8/sq mi)
- Time zone: UTC+01:00 (CET)
  - Summer (DST): UTC+02:00 (CEST)
- INSEE/Postal code: 05121 /05190
- ^{1} French Land Register data, which excludes lakes, ponds, glaciers > 1 km^{2} (0.386 sq mi or 247 acres) and river estuaries.

Rochebrune (French pronunciation: [ʁɔʃbʁyn]; Occitan: Ròchabruna) is a commune in the Hautes-Alpes department in southeastern France.

== Population ==
Historical population
Year	Pop.	±% p.a.
1968	78	—
1975	94	+2.70%
1982	106	+1.73%
1990	99	−0.85%
1999	128	+2.90%
2007	150	+2.00%
2012	171	+2.66%
2017	171	+0.00%
2023	195	+2.21%
Source: INSEE

== See also ==
- Communes of the Hautes-Alpes department
