= Montgardin =

- Commune
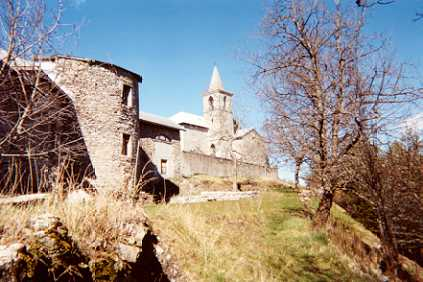
- A view of the church in the village of Montgardin

- Coat of arms
- Location of Montgardin
- Location within France Location within Provence-Alpes-Côte d'Azur
- Coordinates: 44°33′04″N 6°14′25″E
- Country: France
- Region: Provence-Alpes-Côte d'Azur
- Department: Hautes-Alpes
- Arrondissement: Gap
- Canton: Chorges

Government
  - Mayor (2026–32): Chloé Lallemand
- Area^{1}: 15.32 km^{2} (5.92 sq mi)
- Elevation: 839 m (2,753 ft)
- Highest elevation: 1,420 m (4,660 ft)
- Lowest elevation: 772 m (2,533 ft)
- Population (2023): 481
  - Density: 31.4/km^{2} (81.3/sq mi)
- Time zone: UTC+01:00 (CET)
  - Summer (DST): UTC+02:00 (CEST)
- INSEE/Postal code: 05084 /05230
- ^{1} French Land Register data, which excludes lakes, ponds, glaciers > 1 km^{2} (0.386 sq mi or 247 acres) and river estuaries.

Montgardin (French pronunciation: [mɔ̃ɡaʁdɛ̃]) is a commune in the Hautes-Alpes department in southeastern France.

== Population ==
Historical population
Year	Pop.	±% p.a.
1968	182	—
1975	176	−0.48%
1982	249	+5.08%
1990	304	+2.53%
1999	380	+2.51%
2007	418	+1.20%
2012	458	+1.84%
2017	464	+0.26%
2023	481	+0.60%
Source: INSEE

== See also ==
- Communes of the Hautes-Alpes department
