= Rousset-Serre-Ponçon =

- Commune
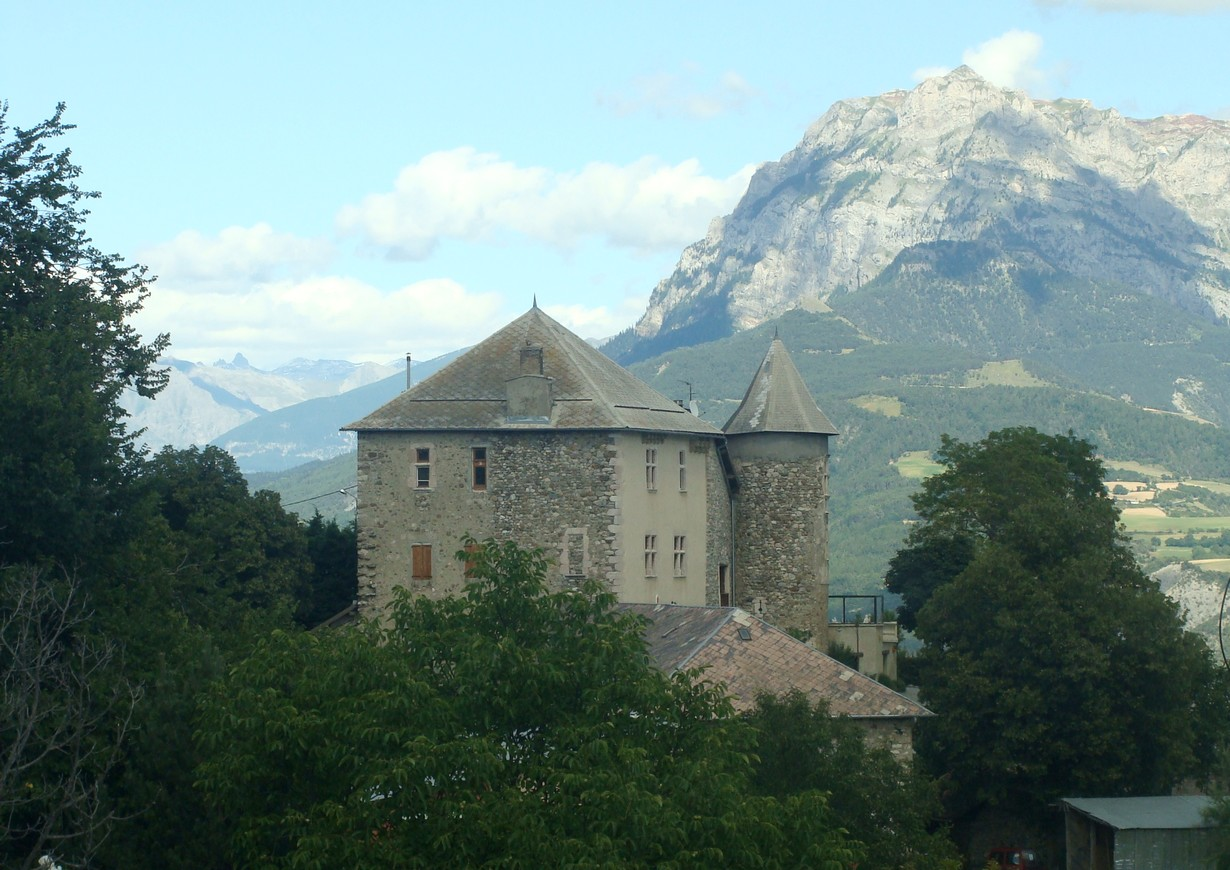
- Chateau

- Coat of arms
- Location of Rousset-Serre-Ponçon
- Location within France Location within Provence-Alpes-Côte d'Azur
- Coordinates: 44°28′02″N 6°14′06″E
- Country: France
- Region: Provence-Alpes-Côte d'Azur
- Department: Hautes-Alpes
- Arrondissement: Gap
- Canton: Chorges

Government
  - Mayor (2026–32): Catherine Saumont
- Area^{1}: 14.38 km^{2} (5.55 sq mi)
- Elevation: 1,040 m (3,410 ft)
- Highest elevation: 1,500 m (4,900 ft)
- Lowest elevation: 650 m (2,130 ft)
- Population (2023): 167
  - Density: 11.6/km^{2} (30.1/sq mi)
- Time zone: UTC+01:00 (CET)
  - Summer (DST): UTC+02:00 (CEST)
- INSEE/Postal code: 05127 /05190
- ^{1} French Land Register data, which excludes lakes, ponds, glaciers > 1 km^{2} (0.386 sq mi or 247 acres) and river estuaries.

Rousset-Serre-Ponçon (French pronunciation: [ʁusɛ]; Occitan: Rosset, before 2025: Rousset) is a commune in the Hautes-Alpes department in southeastern France.

== Population ==
Historical population
Year	Pop.	±% p.a.
1968	174	—
1975	156	−1.55%
1982	127	−2.90%
1990	172	+3.86%
1999	176	+0.26%
2007	171	−0.36%
2012	160	−1.32%
2017	183	+2.72%
2023	167	−1.51%
Source: INSEE

== See also ==
- Communes of the Hautes-Alpes department
