= Réallon =

- Commune
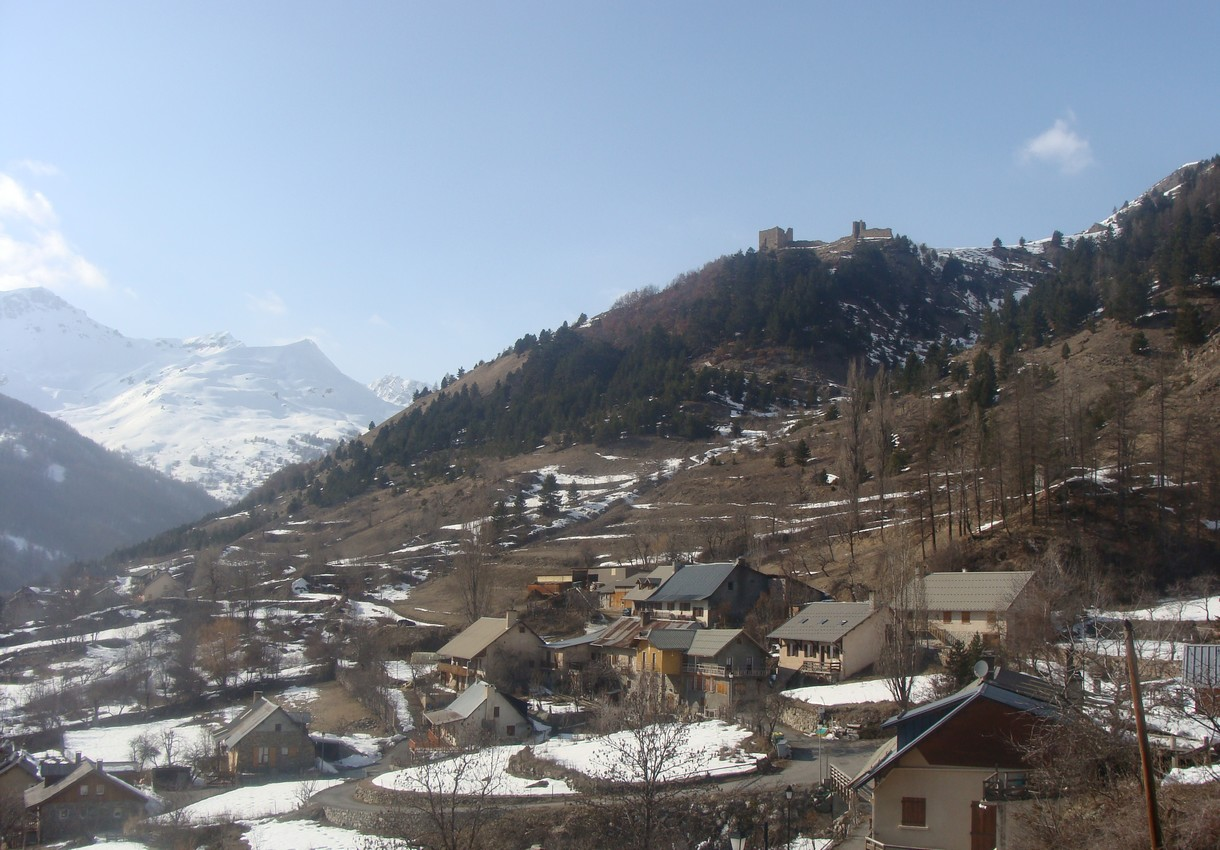
- Location of Réallon
- Location within France Location within Provence-Alpes-Côte d'Azur
- Coordinates: 44°35′47″N 6°21′56″E
- Country: France
- Region: Provence-Alpes-Côte d'Azur
- Department: Hautes-Alpes
- Arrondissement: Gap
- Canton: Chorges
- Intercommunality: Serre-Ponçon

Government
  - Mayor (2026–32): Michel Montabone
- Area^{1}: 71.4 km^{2} (27.6 sq mi)
- Elevation: 1,400 m (4,600 ft)
- Highest elevation: 2,990 m (9,810 ft)
- Lowest elevation: 1,000 m (3,300 ft)
- Population (2023): 242
  - Density: 3.39/km^{2} (8.78/sq mi)
- Time zone: UTC+01:00 (CET)
  - Summer (DST): UTC+02:00 (CEST)
- INSEE/Postal code: 05114 /05160
- ^{1} French Land Register data, which excludes lakes, ponds, glaciers > 1 km^{2} (0.386 sq mi or 247 acres) and river estuaries.

Réallon (French pronunciation: [ʁealɔ̃]; Occitan: Realon) is a commune in the Hautes-Alpes department in southeastern France.

== Population ==
Historical population
Year	Pop.	±% p.a.
1968	288	—
1975	237	−2.75%
1982	179	−3.93%
1990	185	+0.41%
1999	194	+0.53%
2007	228	+2.04%
2012	252	+2.02%
2017	256	+0.32%
2023	242	−0.93%
Source: INSEE

== See also ==
- Communes of the Hautes-Alpes department
