= Lac de Serre-Ponçon =

- Lac de Sèrra Ponçon (Vivaro-Alpine)
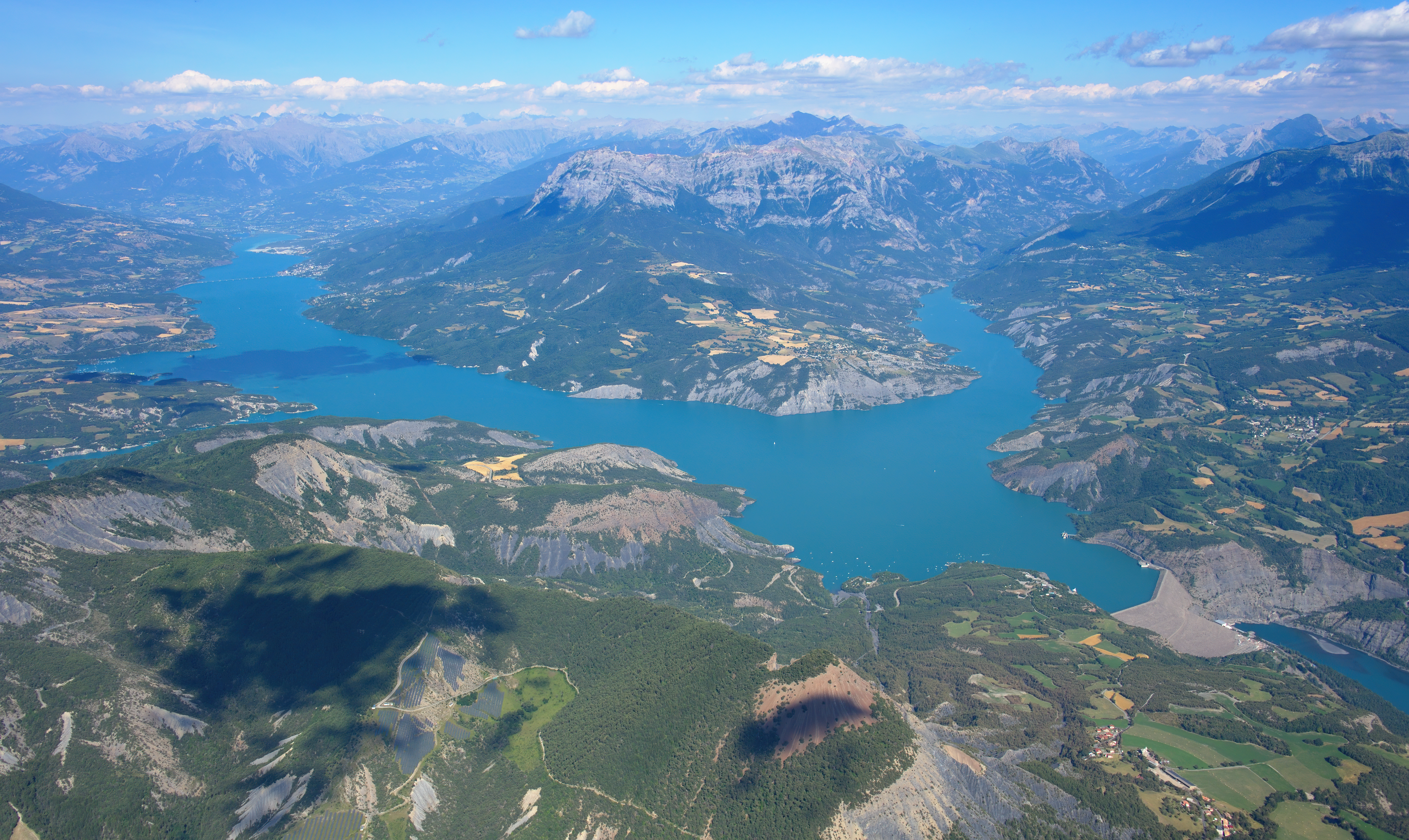

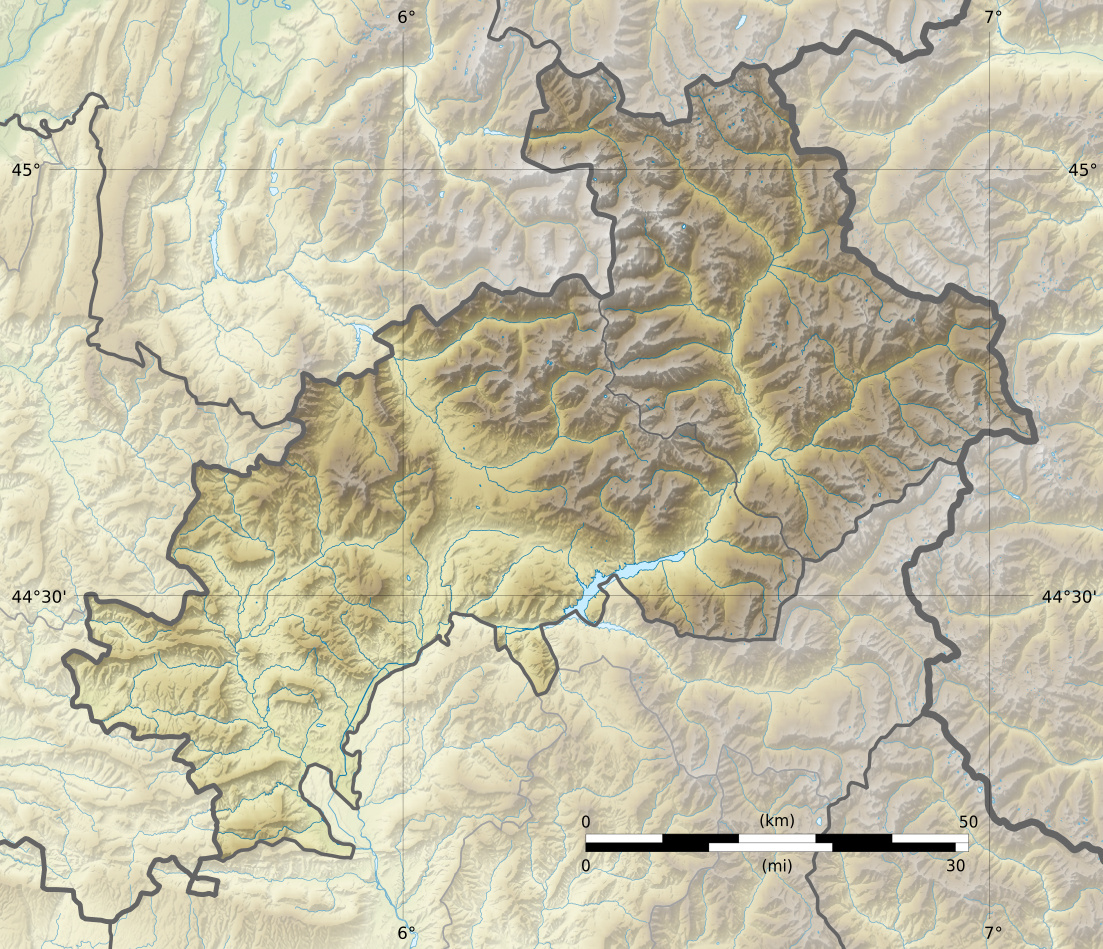
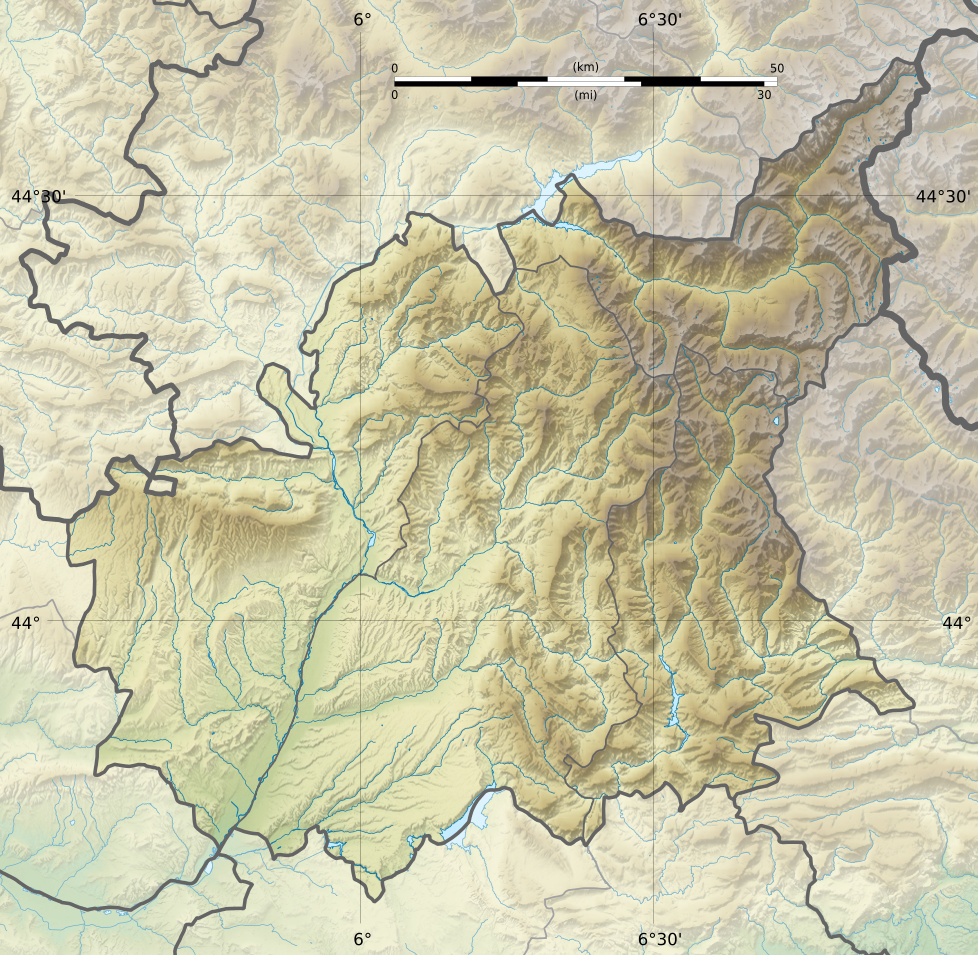
- Location within Hautes-Alpes Location within Alpes-de-Haute-Provence Location within France Location within Provence-Alpes-Côte d'Azur
- Location: Hautes-Alpes and Alpes-de-Haute-Provence
- Coordinates: 44°31′N 6°21′E
- Type: Reservoir
- Primary inflows: Durance, Ubaye
- Primary outflows: Durance
- Catchment area: 3,600 km^{2} (1,400 sq mi)
- Basin countries: France
- Built: 1955
- Max. length: 20 km (12 mi)
- Max. width: 3 km (1.9 mi)
- Surface area: 28 km^{2} (11 sq mi)
- Max. depth: 90 m (300 ft)
- Water volume: 1.272 km^{3} (1,031,000 acre⋅ft)
- Residence time: 0.5 year
- Surface elevation: Max. 780 m (2,560 ft)

The Lac de Serre-Ponçon (French pronunciation: [lak də sɛʁ pɔ̃sɔ̃]; Vivaro-Alpine: Lac de Sèrra Ponçon), known in English as the Lake of Serre-Ponçon, is a reservoir on the border between the Hautes-Alpes and Alpes-de-Haute-Provence departments, in the Provence-Alpes-Côte d'Azur region, Southeastern France, one of the largest in Western Europe. The lake gathers the waters of the Durance and the Ubaye rivers, flowing down through the Hautes-Alpes and the Alpes du Sud to the Rhône. The waters are dammed by the Barrage de Serre-Ponçon, a 123-metre (404 ft) high earth core dam.

As well as water control, sixteen hydroelectric plants use the water, with additional water control supporting; the lake provides irrigation to 1,500 square kilometres (580 sq mi) of land.

== History ==
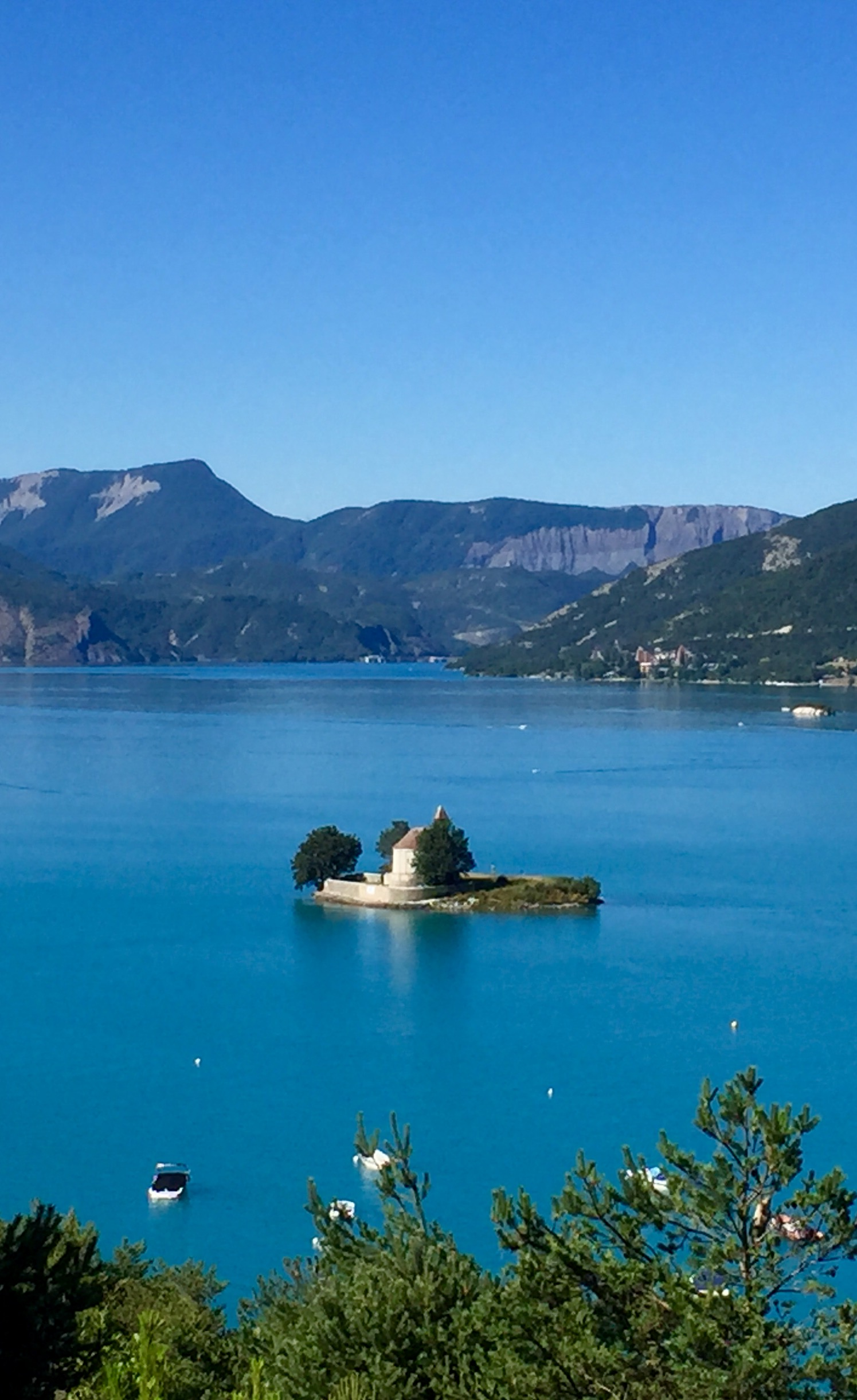
Chapelle Saint-Michel, the island it stands on was once a hill, prior to the construction of the dam.

The lake was created to control water flow after disastrous floods caused severe damage and loss of life in 1843 and 1856. First proposed in 1895, construction started in 1955 and was completed by 1961.

During construction of the lake, approximately 3,000,000 cubic metres (110,000,000 cu ft) of material was moved. The dam was constructed and the valley slowly became a lake, flooding some villages in the process. This flooding is the subject of Jean Giono's movie Girl and the River (1958), starring Guy Béart.

According to the official website of the Muséoscope, the "museum of the largest dam in Europe made of compacted soil", Lac de Serre-Ponçon includes a hydroelectric power plant with a 380 MW generator. In addition to the power plant on the lake itself, the dam provides the reservoir and overall water management to facilitate an additional 15 hydroelectric plants along the Durance and Verdon rivers in Southeastern France, with total capacity of 2,000 MW.

The dam's effects go beyond only the lake itself. It serves as a focal point that supports the functioning of a vast hydroelectric infrastructure network. In Southeast France, this network consists of 15 hydroelectric facilities that are carefully placed along the Durance and Verdon rivers. The combined capacity of these linked plants, which totals 2,000 MW, makes a substantial contribution to sustainable power generation and the region's energy landscape.

Within the lake is a small chapel, Chapelle Saint-Michel, which was originally built on a hill in the 12th century, destroyed by the army of Victor Amadeus II, Duke of Savoy in 1692, and rebuilt soon after. The chapel was originally condemned during the construction of the dam and lake, but survived, its hill becoming an island in the lake. The island is accessible on foot during winter and early spring as the lake is emptier at this period

== Geography ==
Neighboring communes:

- Embrun
- Savines-le-Lac
- Chorges
