= Canton of Chorges =

Coordinates: 44°32′47″N 6°16′38″E

Chorges
- Canton
- Country: France
- Region: Provence-Alpes-Côte d'Azur
- Department: Hautes-Alpes
- No. of communes: {{{nbcomm}}}
- Area: 349.56 km^{2} (134.97 sq mi)
- Population (2023): 11,304
  - Density: 32.338/km^{2} (83.755/sq mi)
- INSEE code: 05 04

The canton of Chorges is an administrative division in southeastern France. At the French canton reorganisation which came into effect in March 2015, the canton was expanded from 8 to 17 communes:

- La Bâtie-Neuve
- Bréziers
- Chorges
- Espinasses
- Montgardin
- Prunières
- Puy-Saint-Eusèbe
- Puy-Sanières
- Réallon
- Remollon
- Rochebrune
- La Rochette
- Rousset-Serre-Ponçon
- Saint-Apollinaire
- Le Sauze-du-Lac
- Savines-le-Lac
- Théus

== Demographics ==
Historical population
Year	Pop.	±% p.a.
2013	10,267	—
2018	10,933	+1.26%
Source: INSEE

== See also ==
- Cantons of the Hautes-Alpes department
- Communes of France
