= Puy-Saint-Eusèbe =

- Commune
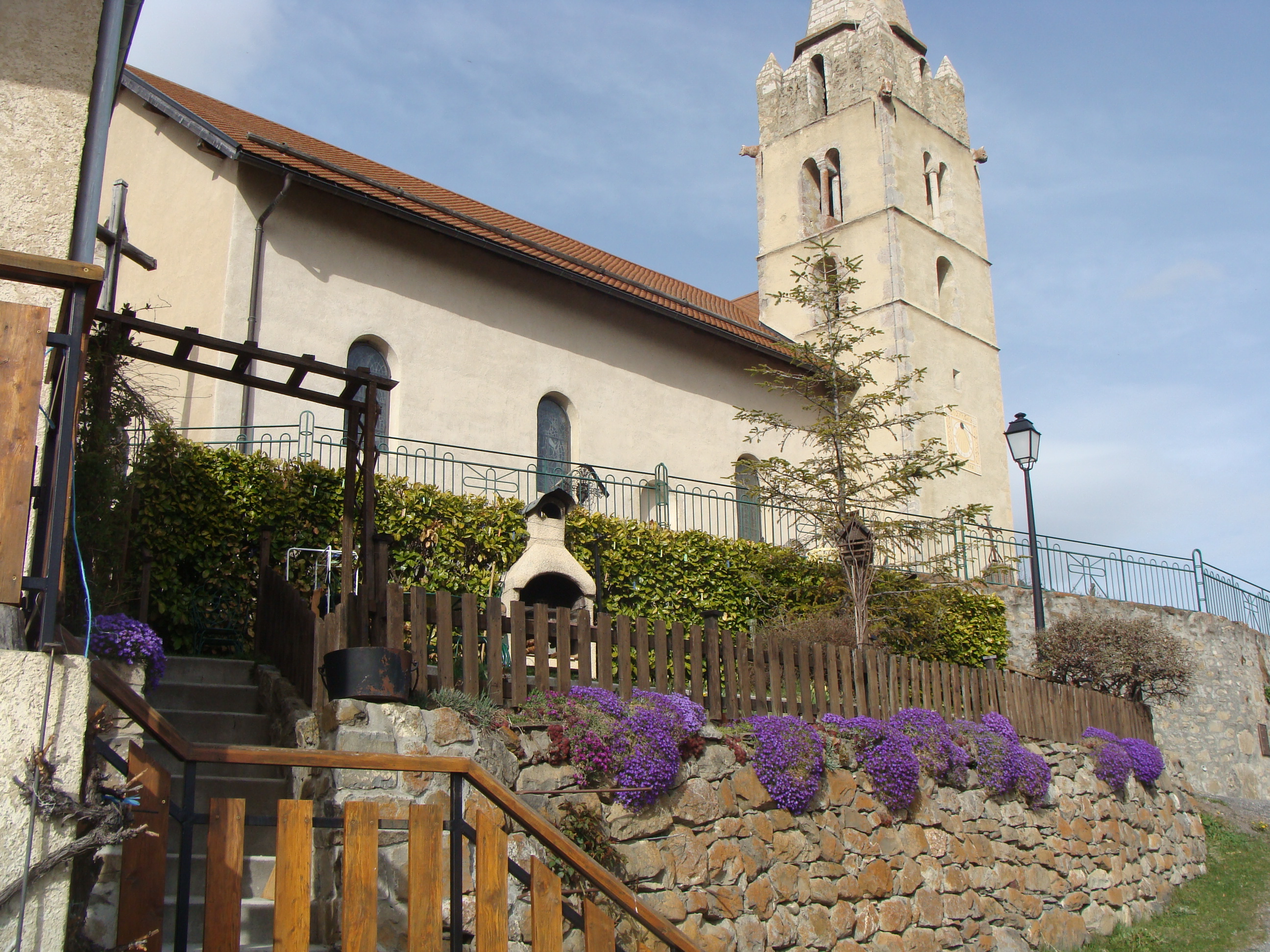
- Puy-Saint-Eusèbe in springtime

- Coat of arms
- Location of Puy-Saint-Eusèbe
- Location within France Location within Provence-Alpes-Côte d'Azur
- Coordinates: 44°34′07″N 6°24′06″E
- Country: France
- Region: Provence-Alpes-Côte d'Azur
- Department: Hautes-Alpes
- Arrondissement: Gap
- Canton: Chorges

Government
  - Mayor (2026–32): Gustave Bosq
- Area^{1}: 11.31 km^{2} (4.37 sq mi)
- Elevation: 1,150 m (3,770 ft)
- Highest elevation: 2,620 m (8,600 ft)
- Lowest elevation: 860 m (2,820 ft)
- Population (2023): 191
  - Density: 16.9/km^{2} (43.7/sq mi)
- Time zone: UTC+01:00 (CET)
  - Summer (DST): UTC+02:00 (CEST)
- INSEE/Postal code: 05108 /05200
- ^{1} French Land Register data, which excludes lakes, ponds, glaciers > 1 km^{2} (0.386 sq mi or 247 acres) and river estuaries.

Puy-Saint-Eusèbe (French pronunciation: [pɥi sɛ̃.t‿øzɛb]; Vivaro-Alpine: Puei Sant Eusebi) is a commune in the Hautes-Alpes department in southeastern France.

== Population ==
Historical population
Year	Pop.	±% p.a.
1968	81	—
1975	64	−3.31%
1982	73	+1.90%
1990	93	+3.07%
1999	115	+2.39%
2007	120	+0.53%
2012	130	+1.61%
2017	138	+1.20%
2023	191	+5.57%
Source: INSEE

== See also ==
- Communes of the Hautes-Alpes department
