= Espinasses =

- Commune
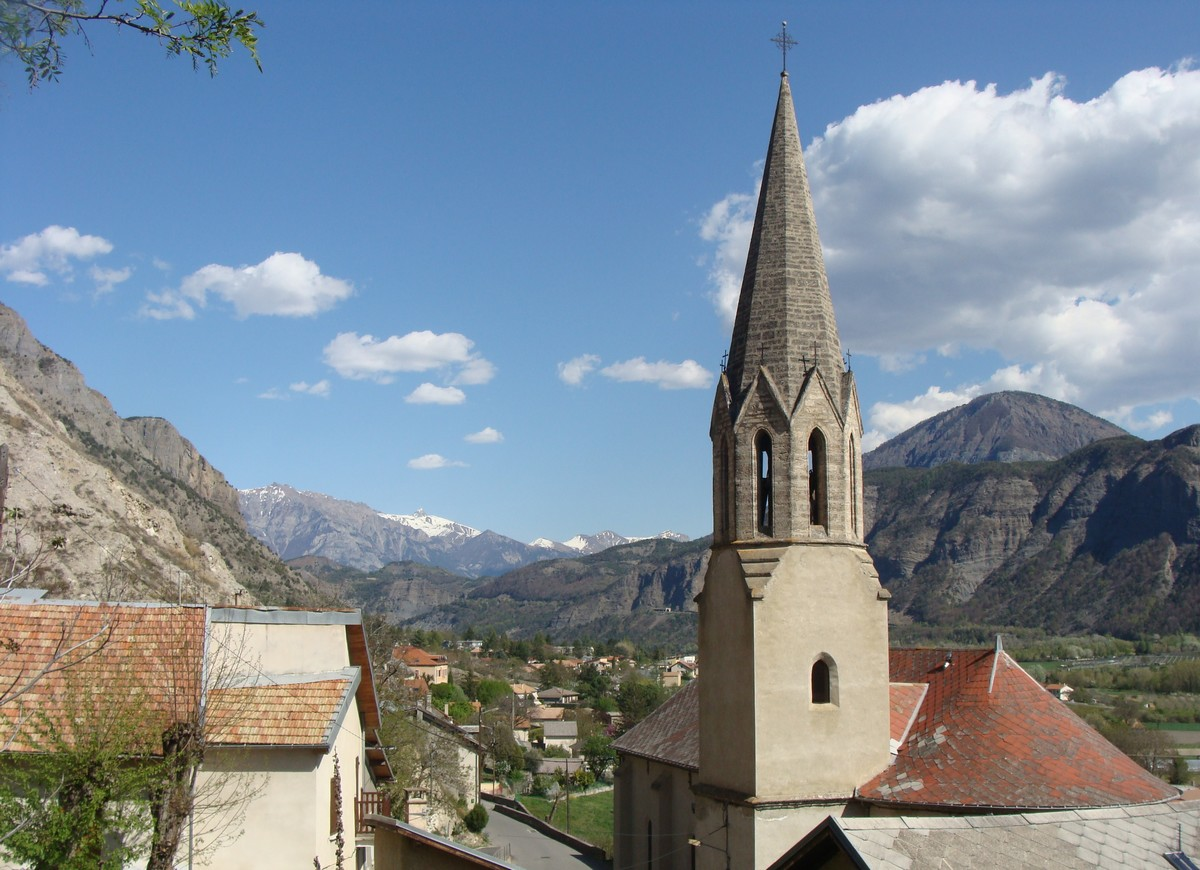
- The church and the village of Espinasses

- Coat of arms
- Location of Espinasses
- Location within France Location within Provence-Alpes-Côte d'Azur
- Coordinates: 44°28′02″N 6°13′32″E
- Country: France
- Region: Provence-Alpes-Côte d'Azur
- Department: Hautes-Alpes
- Arrondissement: Gap
- Canton: Chorges

Government
  - Mayor (2026–32): Clémence Saunier
- Area^{1}: 13.86 km^{2} (5.35 sq mi)
- Elevation: 652 m (2,139 ft)
- Highest elevation: 1,730 m (5,680 ft)
- Lowest elevation: 637 m (2,090 ft)
- Population (2023): 777
  - Density: 56.1/km^{2} (145/sq mi)
- Time zone: UTC+01:00 (CET)
  - Summer (DST): UTC+02:00 (CEST)
- INSEE/Postal code: 05050 /05190
- ^{1} French Land Register data, which excludes lakes, ponds, glaciers > 1 km^{2} (0.386 sq mi or 247 acres) and river estuaries.

Espinasses (French pronunciation: [ɛspinas]) is a commune in the Hautes-Alpes department in southeastern France.

== Population ==
Historical population
Year	Pop.	±% p.a.
1968	506	—
1975	533	+0.75%
1982	565	+0.84%
1990	505	−1.39%
1999	587	+1.69%
2007	660	+1.48%
2012	695	+1.04%
2017	796	+2.75%
2023	777	−0.40%
Source: INSEE

== See also ==
- Communes of the Hautes-Alpes department
