= Saint-Apollinaire, Hautes-Alpes =

Saint-Apollinaire
- Commune
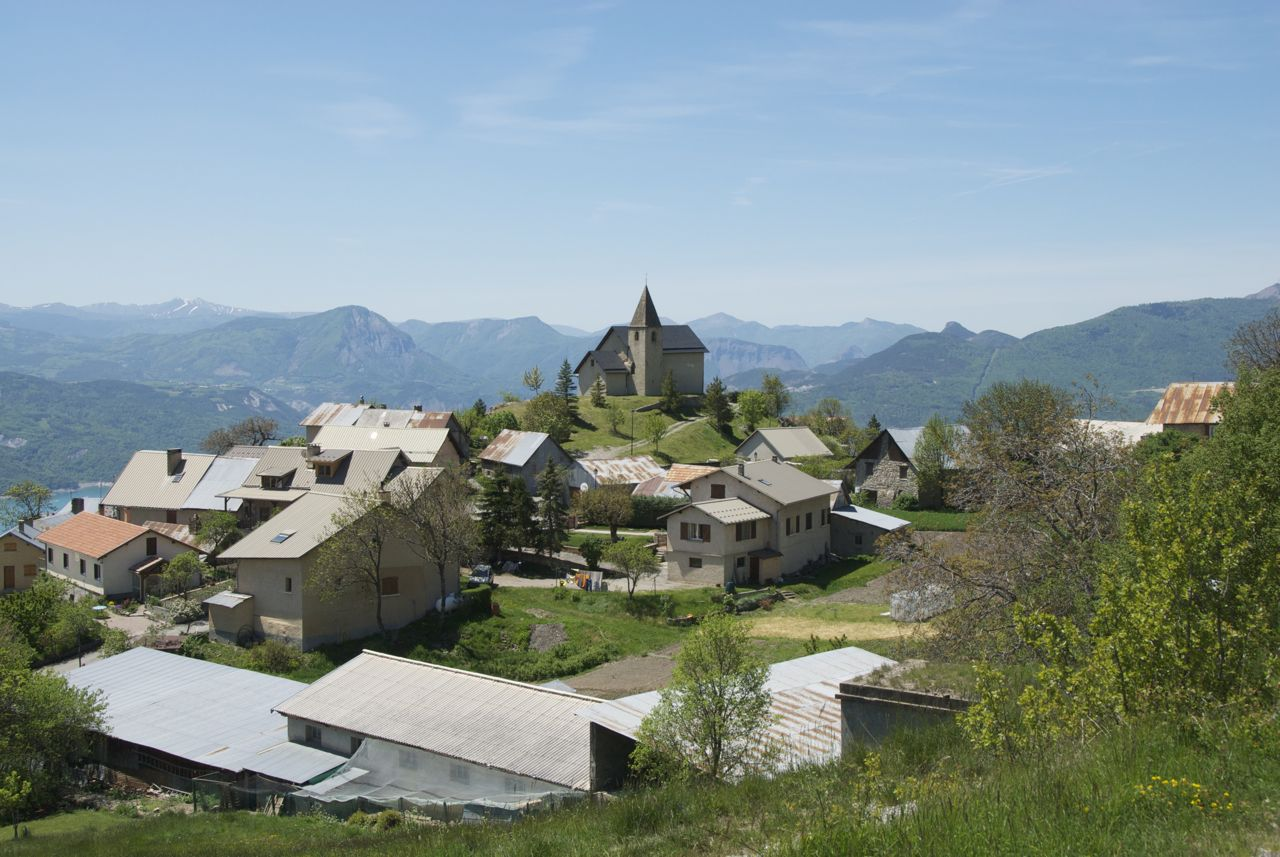
- A general view of Saint-Apollinaire with the church and surrounding buildings

- Coat of arms
- Location of Saint-Apollinaire
- Location within France Location within Provence-Alpes-Côte d'Azur
- Coordinates: 44°33′25″N 6°21′47″E
- Country: France
- Region: Provence-Alpes-Côte d'Azur
- Department: Hautes-Alpes
- Arrondissement: Gap
- Canton: Chorges

Government
  - Mayor (2026–32): Daniel Bey
- Area^{1}: 7.54 km^{2} (2.91 sq mi)
- Elevation: 1,200 m (3,900 ft)
- Highest elevation: 2,120 m (6,960 ft)
- Lowest elevation: 858 m (2,815 ft)
- Population (2023): 209
  - Density: 27.7/km^{2} (71.8/sq mi)
- Time zone: UTC+01:00 (CET)
  - Summer (DST): UTC+02:00 (CEST)
- INSEE/Postal code: 05130 /05160
- ^{1} French Land Register data, which excludes lakes, ponds, glaciers > 1 km^{2} (0.386 sq mi or 247 acres) and river estuaries.

Saint-Apollinaire (French pronunciation: [sɛ̃.t‿apɔlinɛʁ]; Vivaro-Alpine: Sant Apolinari) is a commune in the Hautes-Alpes department in southeastern France.

== Population ==
Historical population
Year	Pop.	±% p.a.
1968	63	—
1975	71	+1.72%
1982	63	−1.69%
1990	99	+5.81%
1999	106	+0.76%
2007	110	+0.46%
2012	123	+2.26%
2017	141	+2.77%
2023	209	+6.78%
Source: INSEE

== See also ==
- Communes of the Hautes-Alpes department
