= Puy-Sanières =

- Commune
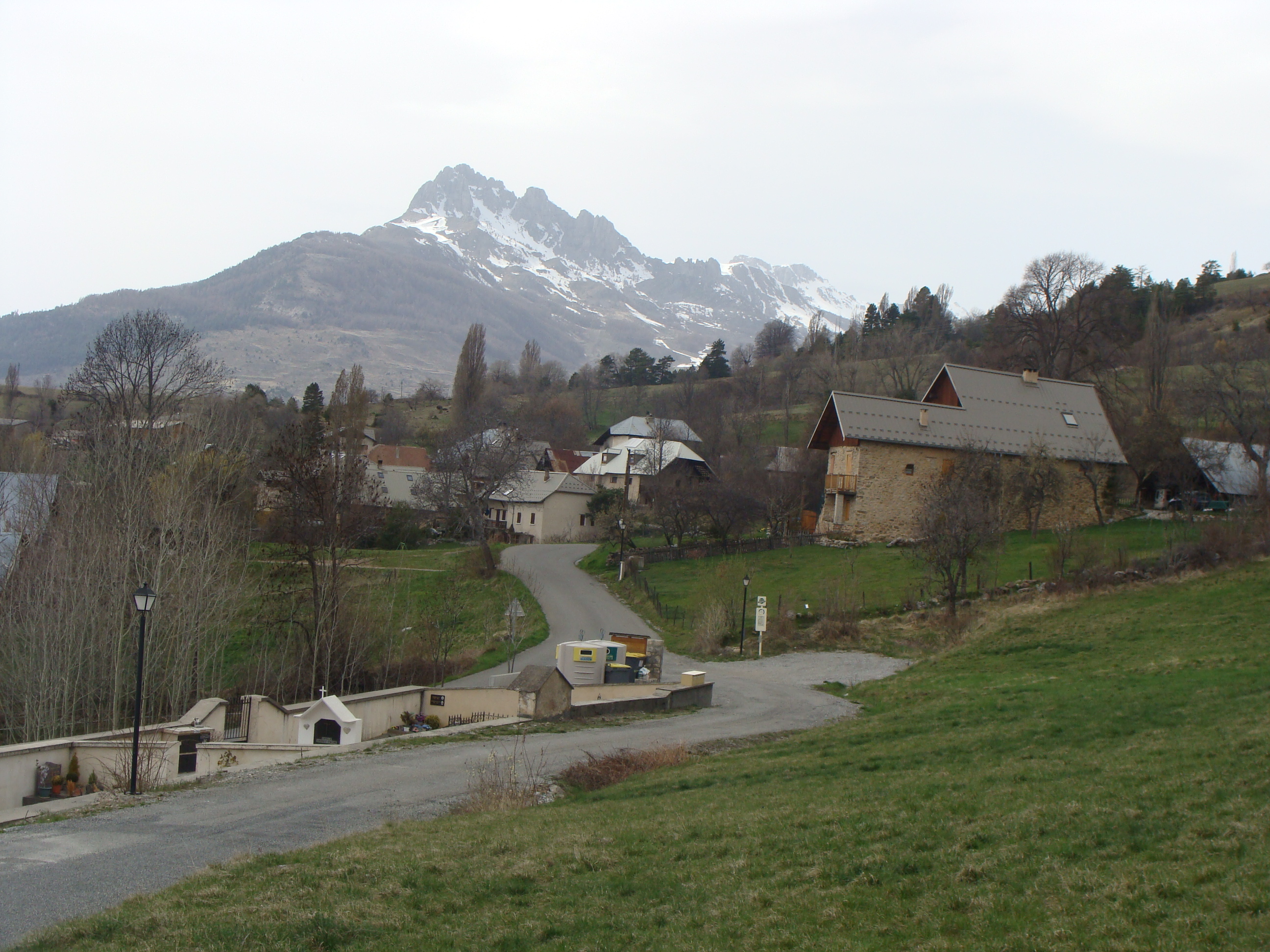
- A partial view of the village of Puy-Sanières

- Coat of arms
- Location of Puy-Sanières
- Location within France Location within Provence-Alpes-Côte d'Azur
- Coordinates: 44°33′32″N 6°26′06″E
- Country: France
- Region: Provence-Alpes-Côte d'Azur
- Department: Hautes-Alpes
- Arrondissement: Gap
- Canton: Chorges

Government
  - Mayor (2026–32): Bruno Paris
- Area^{1}: 11.38 km^{2} (4.39 sq mi)
- Elevation: 1,125 m (3,691 ft)
- Highest elevation: 2,524 m (8,281 ft)
- Lowest elevation: 780 m (2,560 ft)
- Population (2023): 288
  - Density: 25.3/km^{2} (65.5/sq mi)
- Time zone: UTC+01:00 (CET)
  - Summer (DST): UTC+02:00 (CEST)
- INSEE/Postal code: 05111 /05200
- ^{1} French Land Register data, which excludes lakes, ponds, glaciers > 1 km^{2} (0.386 sq mi or 247 acres) and river estuaries.

Puy-Sanières (French pronunciation: [pɥi sanjɛʁ]; Occitan: Puei Sanheras) is a commune in the Hautes-Alpes department in southeastern France.

== Population ==
Historical population
Year	Pop.	±% p.a.
1968	78	—
1975	66	−2.36%
1982	31	−10.23%
1990	106	+16.61%
1999	155	+4.31%
2007	211	+3.93%
2012	231	+1.83%
2017	283	+4.14%
2023	288	+0.29%
Source: INSEE

== See also ==
- Communes of the Hautes-Alpes department
