= Savines-le-Lac =

Savines-le-Lac Savina lo Lac (Occitan)
- Commune
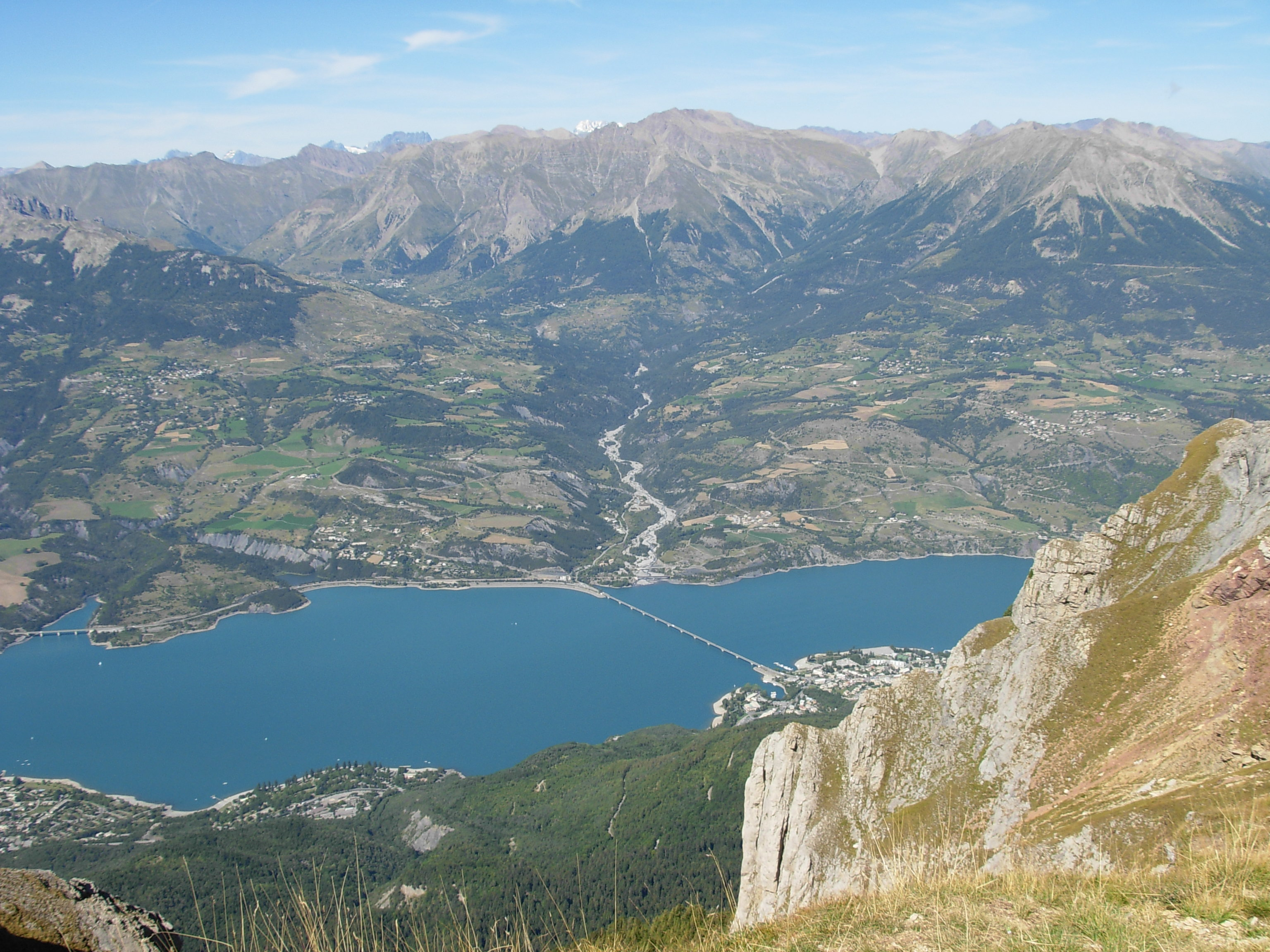
- Savines and the Lac de Serre-Ponçon

- Coat of arms
- Location of Savines-le-Lac
- Location within France Location within Provence-Alpes-Côte d'Azur
- Coordinates: 44°31′37″N 6°24′20″E
- Country: France
- Region: Provence-Alpes-Côte d'Azur
- Department: Hautes-Alpes
- Arrondissement: Gap
- Canton: Chorges
- Intercommunality: CC de Serre-Ponçon

Government
  - Mayor (2026–32): Victor Berenguel
- Area^{1}: 25.13 km^{2} (9.70 sq mi)
- Elevation: 790 m (2,590 ft)
- Highest elevation: 2,260 m (7,410 ft)
- Lowest elevation: 775 m (2,543 ft)
- Population (2023): 1,102
  - Density: 43.85/km^{2} (113.6/sq mi)
- Demonym: Savinois
- Time zone: UTC+01:00 (CET)
  - Summer (DST): UTC+02:00 (CEST)
- INSEE/Postal code: 05164 /05160
- Website: www.savines-le-lac.fr
- ^{1} French Land Register data, which excludes lakes, ponds, glaciers > 1 km^{2} (0.386 sq mi or 247 acres) and river estuaries.

Savines-le-Lac (French pronunciation: [savin lə lak]; Vivaro-Alpine Occitan: Savina lo Lac; lit. 'Savines-the-Lake'; until 1961: Savines) is a commune in the Hautes-Alpes department in southeastern France.

== Population ==
Historical population
Year	Pop.	±% p.a.
1968	589	—
1975	663	+1.71%
1982	790	+2.54%
1990	759	−0.50%
1999	815	+0.79%
2007	1,120	+4.05%
2012	1,068	−0.95%
2017	1,058	−0.19%
2023	1,102	+0.68%
Source: INSEE

== Twin town ==
Savines-le-Lac is twinned with:

- Luserna San Giovanni, Italy

== See also ==
- Communes of the Hautes-Alpes department
