= Chorges =

- Commune
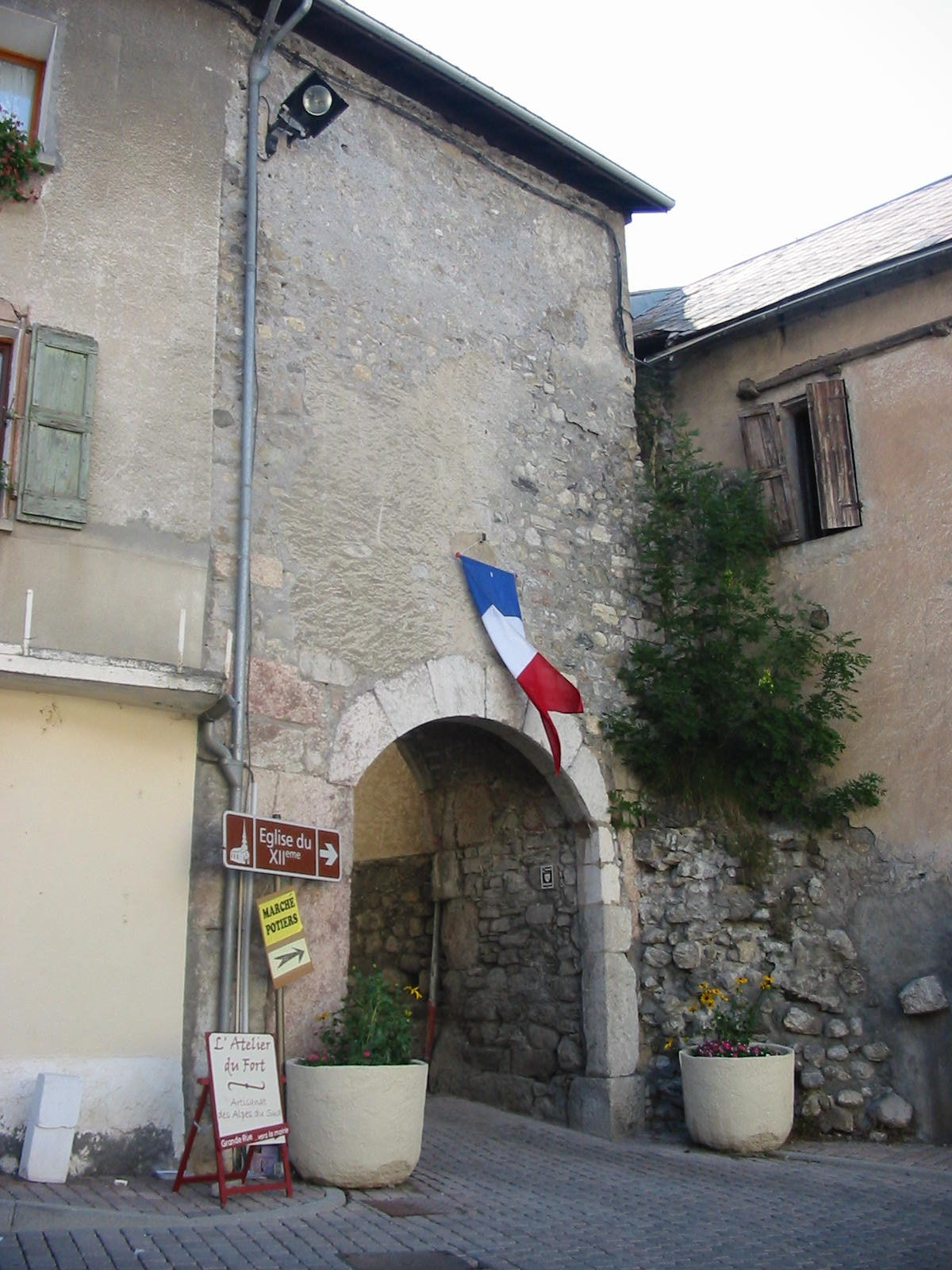
- Porte des Souchons

- Coat of arms
- Location of Chorges
- Location within France Location within Provence-Alpes-Côte d'Azur
- Coordinates: 44°32′47″N 6°16′38″E
- Country: France
- Region: Provence-Alpes-Côte d'Azur
- Department: Hautes-Alpes
- Arrondissement: Gap
- Canton: Chorges

Government
  - Mayor (2026–32): Jérôme Arnaud
- Area^{1}: 53.34 km^{2} (20.59 sq mi)
- Elevation: 864 m (2,835 ft)
- Highest elevation: 2,485 m (8,153 ft)
- Lowest elevation: 773 m (2,536 ft)
- Population (2023): 3,146
  - Density: 58.98/km^{2} (152.8/sq mi)
- Time zone: UTC+01:00 (CET)
  - Summer (DST): UTC+02:00 (CEST)
- INSEE/Postal code: 05040 /05230
- ^{1} French Land Register data, which excludes lakes, ponds, glaciers > 1 km^{2} (0.386 sq mi or 247 acres) and river estuaries.

Chorges (French pronunciation: [ʃɔʁʒ]; Vivaro-Alpine: Chorge) is a commune in the Hautes-Alpes department in southeastern France.

It is close to Gap. The name Chorges derives from Latin Catorimagus, itself coming from the Alpine tribe of the Caturiges in the ancient Roman province of Alpes Maritimae.

== Location ==
The village is 11 km (6.8 mi) away from La Bâtie-Vieille.

== Population ==
Historical population
Year	Pop.	±% p.a.
1968	1,173	—
1975	1,242	+0.82%
1982	1,391	+1.63%
1990	1,561	+1.45%
1999	1,882	+2.10%
2007	2,419	+3.19%
2012	2,714	+2.33%
2017	2,973	+1.84%
2023	3,146	+0.95%
Source: INSEE

== See also ==
- Communes of the Hautes-Alpes department
