= Canton of La Motte-du-Caire =

Coordinates: 44°20′40″N 6°01′45″E

La Motte-du-Caire
- Former canton
- Interactive map of La Motte-du-Caire
- Country: France
- Region: Provence-Alpes-Côte d'Azur
- Department: Alpes-de-Haute-Provence
- No. of communes: {{{nbcomm}}}
- Disbanded: 2015
- Area: 255.99 km^{2} (98.84 sq mi)
- Population (2012): 2,563
  - Density: 10.01/km^{2} (25.93/sq mi)

The canton of La Motte-du-Caire is a former administrative division in southeastern France. It was disbanded following the French canton reorganisation which came into effect in March 2015. It consisted of 13 communes, which joined the canton of Seyne in 2015. It had 2,563 inhabitants (2012).

The canton comprised the following communes:

- Le Caire
- Châteaufort
- Clamensane
- Claret
- Curbans
- Melve
- La Motte-du-Caire
- Nibles
- Sigoyer
- Thèze
- Valavoire
- Valernes
- Vaumeilh

== Demographics ==
Historical population Canton of La Motte-du-Caire
Year	1962	1968	1975	1982	1990	1999
Pop.	1,382	1,536	1,500	1,605	1,897	2,090
±%	—	+11.1%	−2.3%	+7.0%	+18.2%	+10.2%
From the year 1962 on: No double counting – residents of multiple communes (e.g. students and military personnel) are counted only once. Source: INSEE

== See also ==
- Cantons of the Alpes-de-Haute-Provence department
