= Canton of Turriers =

Coordinates: 44°24′08″N 6°10′11″E

Turriers
- Former canton
- Interactive map of Turriers
- Country: France
- Region: Provence-Alpes-Côte d'Azur
- Department: Alpes-de-Haute-Provence
- No. of communes: {{{nbcomm}}}
- Disbanded: 2015
- Area: 226.22 km^{2} (87.34 sq mi)
- Population (2012): 1,265
  - Density: 5.592/km^{2} (14.48/sq mi)

The canton of Turriers is a former administrative division in southeastern France. It was disbanded following the French canton reorganisation which came into effect in March 2015. It consisted of 7 communes, which joined the canton of Seyne in 2015. It had 1,265 inhabitants (2012).

The canton comprised the following communes:

- Bayons
- Bellaffaire
- Faucon-du-Caire
- Gigors
- Piégut
- Turriers
- Venterol

== Demographics ==
Historical population Canton of Turriers
Year	1962	1968	1975	1982	1990	1999
Pop.	731	836	776	799	909	1,033
±%	—	+14.4%	−7.2%	+3.0%	+13.8%	+13.6%
From the year 1962 on: No double counting – residents of multiple communes (e.g. students and military personnel) are counted only once. Source: INSEE

== See also ==
- Cantons of the Alpes-de-Haute-Provence department
