= Arrondissement of Forcalquier =

Coordinates: 43.97°N 5.78°E

Forcalquier
- Arrondissement
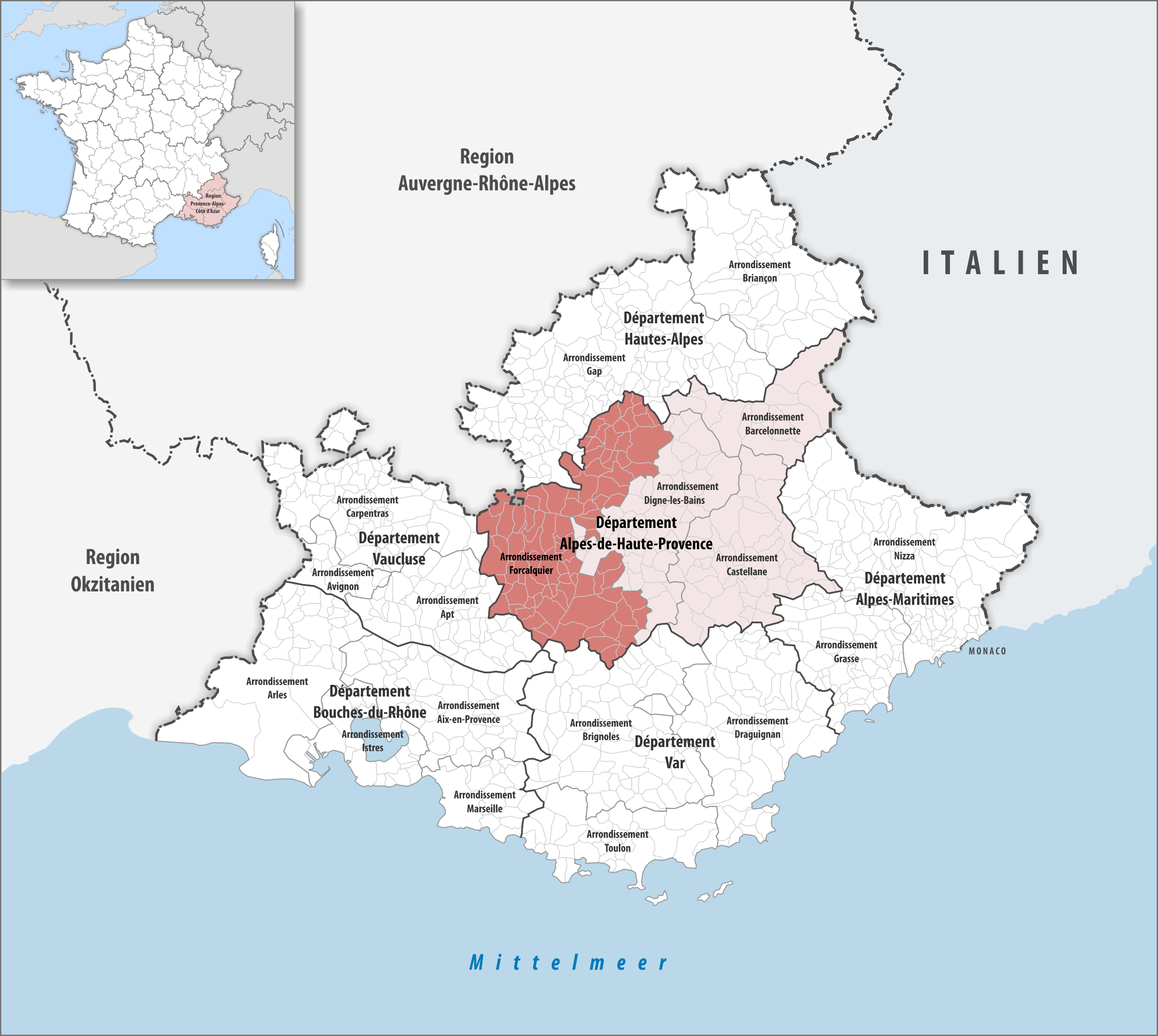
- Location within the region Provence-Alpes-Côte d'Azur
- Country: France
- Region: Provence-Alpes-Côte d'Azur
- Department: Alpes-de-Haute-Provence
- No. of communes: {{{nbcomm}}}
- Area: 2,605.4 km^{2} (1,006.0 sq mi)
- Population (2023): 99,685
  - Density: 38.261/km^{2} (99.095/sq mi)
- INSEE code: 044

The arrondissement of Forcalquier is an arrondissement of France in the Alpes-de-Haute-Provence department in the Provence-Alpes-Côte d'Azur region. It has 97 communes. Its population is 98,841 (2021), and its area is 2,605.4 km^{2} (1,006.0 sq mi).

== Composition ==
The communes of the arrondissement of Forcalquier, and their INSEE codes, are:

1. Allemagne-en-Provence (04004)
2. Aubenas-les-Alpes (04012)
3. Aubignosc (04013)
4. Authon (04016)
5. Banon (04018)
6. Bayons (04023)
7. Bellaffaire (04026)
8. Bevons (04027)
9. La Brillanne (04034)
10. Brunet (04035)
11. Le Caire (04037)
12. Le Castellet (04041)
13. Céreste (04045)
14. Châteaufort (04050)
15. Châteauneuf-Miravail (04051)
16. Châteauneuf-Val-Saint-Donat (04053)
17. Clamensane (04057)
18. Claret (04058)
19. Corbières-en-Provence (04063)
20. Cruis (04065)
21. Curbans (04066)
22. Curel (04067)
23. Dauphin (04068)
24. Entrepierres (04075)
25. Entrevennes (04077)
26. Esparron-de-Verdon (04081)
27. Faucon-du-Caire (04085)
28. Fontienne (04087)
29. Forcalquier (04088)
30. Gigors (04093)
31. Gréoux-les-Bains (04094)
32. L'Hospitalet (04095)
33. Lardiers (04101)
34. Limans (04104)
35. Lurs (04106)
36. Mane (04111)
37. Manosque (04112)
38. Melve (04118)
39. Mison (04123)
40. Montagnac-Montpezat (04124)
41. Montfort (04127)
42. Montfuron (04128)
43. Montjustin (04129)
44. Montlaux (04130)
45. Montsalier (04132)
46. La Motte-du-Caire (04134)
47. Nibles (04137)
48. Niozelles (04138)
49. Noyers-sur-Jabron (04139)
50. Les Omergues (04140)
51. Ongles (04141)
52. Oppedette (04142)
53. Oraison (04143)
54. Peipin (04145)
55. Piégut (04150)
56. Pierrerue (04151)
57. Pierrevert (04152)
58. Puimichel (04156)
59. Puimoisson (04157)
60. Quinson (04158)
61. Redortiers (04159)
62. Reillanne (04160)
63. Revest-des-Brousses (04162)
64. Revest-du-Bion (04163)
65. Revest-Saint-Martin (04164)
66. Riez (04166)
67. La Rochegiron (04169)
68. Roumoules (04172)
69. Sainte-Croix-à-Lauze (04175)
70. Saint-Étienne-les-Orgues (04178)
71. Sainte-Tulle (04197)
72. Saint-Geniez (04179)
73. Saint-Laurent-du-Verdon (04186)
74. Saint-Maime (04188)
75. Saint-Martin-de-Brômes (04189)
76. Saint-Martin-les-Eaux (04190)
77. Saint-Michel-l'Observatoire (04192)
78. Saint-Vincent-sur-Jabron (04199)
79. Salignac (04200)
80. Saumane (04201)
81. Sigonce (04206)
82. Sigoyer (04207)
83. Simiane-la-Rotonde (04208)
84. Sisteron (04209)
85. Sourribes (04211)
86. Thèze (04216)
87. Turriers (04222)
88. Vachères (04227)
89. Valavoire (04228)
90. Valbelle (04229)
91. Valensole (04230)
92. Valernes (04231)
93. Vaumeilh (04233)
94. Venterol (04234)
95. Villemus (04241)
96. Villeneuve (04242)
97. Volx (04245)

== History ==
The arrondissement of Forcalquier was created in 1800. At the January 2017 reorganization of the arrondissements of Alpes-de-Haute-Provence, it gained 16 communes from the arrondissement of Digne-les-Bains, and it lost six communes to the arrondissement of Digne-les-Bains.

As a result of the reorganisation of the cantons of France which came into effect in 2015, the borders of the cantons are no longer related to the borders of the arrondissements. The cantons of the arrondissement of Forcalquier were, as of January 2015:

1. Banon
2. Forcalquier
3. Manosque-Nord
4. Manosque-Sud-Est
5. Manosque-Sud-Ouest
6. La Motte-du-Caire
7. Noyers-sur-Jabron
8. Peyruis
9. Reillanne
10. Saint-Étienne-les-Orgues
11. Sisteron
12. Turriers
13. Volonne
