= Turriers =

- Commune
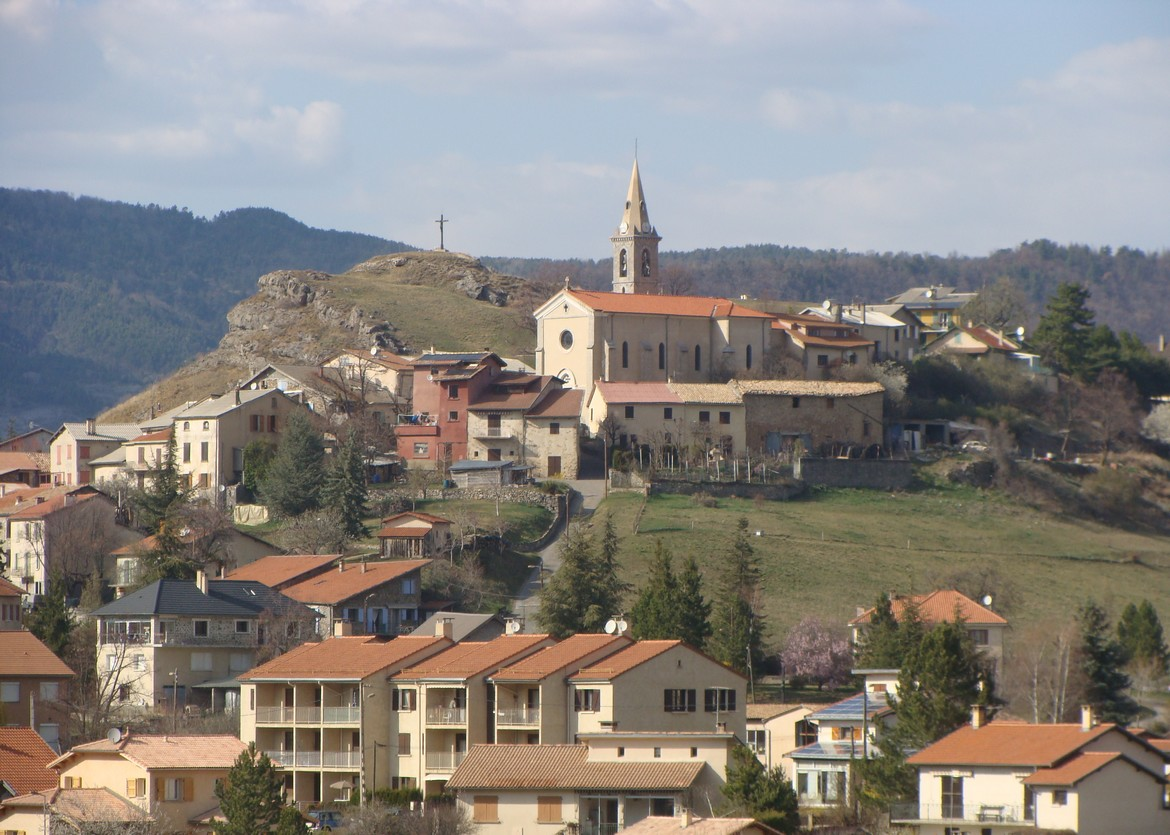
- The church and surrounding buildings in Turriers

- Coat of arms
- Location of Turriers
- Location within France Location within Provence-Alpes-Côte d'Azur
- Coordinates: 44°24′08″N 6°10′11″E
- Country: France
- Region: Provence-Alpes-Côte d'Azur
- Department: Alpes-de-Haute-Provence
- Arrondissement: Forcalquier
- Canton: Seyne

Government
  - Mayor (2026–32): Jean-Yves Sigaud
- Area^{1}: 19.86 km^{2} (7.67 sq mi)
- Elevation: 1,040 m (3,410 ft)
- Highest elevation: 1,714 m (5,623 ft)
- Lowest elevation: 853 m (2,799 ft)
- Population (2023): 345
  - Density: 17.4/km^{2} (45.0/sq mi)
- Time zone: UTC+01:00 (CET)
  - Summer (DST): UTC+02:00 (CEST)
- INSEE/Postal code: 04222 /04250
- ^{1} French Land Register data, which excludes lakes, ponds, glaciers > 1 km^{2} (0.386 sq mi or 247 acres) and river estuaries.

Turriers (French pronunciation: [tyʁje]) is a commune in the Alpes-de-Haute-Provence department in southeastern France.

== Population ==
Historical population
Year	Pop.	±% p.a.
1968	230	—
1975	226	−0.25%
1982	286	+3.42%
1990	276	−0.44%
1999	297	+0.82%
2007	406	+3.99%
2012	367	−2.00%
2017	318	−2.83%
2023	345	+1.37%
Source: INSEE

== Geography ==
The village is situated at an altitude of 1,040 meters on a rocky promontory called "Les Baumelles". It presents the classic aspect of an Haute Provence hilltop village. Turriers has long been a farming community, along with its surrounding hamlets, and is the focal point of a vast basin of meadow and farmland topped by forest. The ancient farming activities are still in evidence. The meadows are enclosed by a spectacular circle of hills rising up to 850 m above Turriers. To the north, there are clear views of the High Alps.

Turriers is approached from Sisteron or Gap by the routes D951 and D1; from the east by the D1 from Seyne Alpes; from the south by the D5 from Bayons. Other communes located near Turriers are Bellaffaire, Saint-Martin-lès-Seyne, Bayons, Faucon-du-Caire, and Gigors.

== Geology ==
Turriers is situated in the northern section of the Digne pre-Alps on the Digne nappe, a thrust sheet with a depth of approx. 5,000 m that moved south-west during the Oligocene epoch towards the end of the period when the Alps were forming. The lobes (or scales) demark the western edge of the nappe. During the Riss glaciation, Turriers was entirely submerged under the Durance glacier. During the Würm glaciation, the glacier was less dense and came to a halt at Les Tourniquets (a series of steep hairpin bends to the south between Turriers and Bayons), at that time crossed by a tongue of the Riss glacier. These two successive glaciers shaped the Col des Sagnes, to the south of the village. In the west, they crossed the Col de Sarraut and entered the valley known as the Grand Vallon. In the Würm glaciation the height of the glacier at Forest Loin, west of Turriers, dropped to approx. 1,250 m. here the ice had a depth of 150 m, compared to over 200 m at Turriers. The successive geological eras have left dramatic traces in the landscapes around Turriers, particularly in the vertical plates of fossil-rich limestone typical of the region; the mountain called Roche Cline to the west of the village is a fine example.

== History ==
The documented history of Turriers goes back to the pre-Roman era when the area was inhabited by a Celtic-Ligurian tribe called the Avantici. At the time of the Roman invasion, 1st century BC, the first military road constructed by the Romans followed the River Durance, 25 km north of Turriers. Today this is the N900 from Gap (05) to Cuneo in Italy. Turriers became part of a Roman farming settlement, centered in the nearby village of Gigors. In the Middle Ages, the lands around Turriers came under the control of the Abbey of Saint-Victor in Marseille. As a result, Turriers had several churches, chapels, monasteries, convents, and shrines. Of these, only the main church at the top of the village and some rural shrines survive. Up until the 1789 French Revolution, Turriers, like its neighboring villages, was governed by a local landed family. The small chateau in the main square still bears testimony to this. After the Revolution protective walls and gates were broken down and the village expanded a little; former sheepfolds on the edge of the village became well-to-do dwellings. In the departmental system created by Napoleon, Turriers was the chef-lieu (main town) of a canton. In the 19th century, this fact justified the placement of a residential police force of 6 officers and a brigadier which is still present today. The original police accommodation, Ancienne Gendarmerie, is now one of the historic buildings in the commune. The Great War 1914 - 1918 and the ensuing flight to the cities did not decimate the population of Turriers as much as most villages in Haute Provence. The surrounding lands were rich enough to continue to feed the population. The Second World War and the German invasion of 1940 hardly impacted local life. There was some Resistance fighting but it was centered on German strongholds in Sisteron and the Ubaye Valley. Under the Fifth Republic and recent European legislation Turriers has moved from being an independent commune to a member of a larger legislative and population group, the Communauté de Communes de Sisteron-Buëch. It still, however, retains its own mayor and local council. Turriers' most famous son is the early 16th-century surgeon Pierre Franco who worked in France and Switzerland. In an age of hacks, he was the first French surgeon to be recognized as such and also for his scholarship. The main square in Turriers is named after Pierre Franco.

== Natural history ==
The countryside around Turriers is rich in flora and fauna. Species may be found here that are endangered or extinct in the rest of Europe. Part of the commune is included in a Natura 2000 zone.

== Tourism ==
The good climate and clean atmosphere attract a small flow of tourists, for whom there is ample accommodation (hotel, holiday apartments, guest rooms). A restaurant, bar and village shop provide for catering needs. Entertainment (cultural and sporting events) is offered by the village committee and the local tourist office. Major international sports events such as the Monte Carlo Rally and the Tour de France also regularly pass through or near Turriers.

Buses and taxis serve the nearby towns of Sisteron (04) and Gap (05).

== See also ==
- Communes of the Alpes-de-Haute-Provence department
