= Montagne de la Baume =

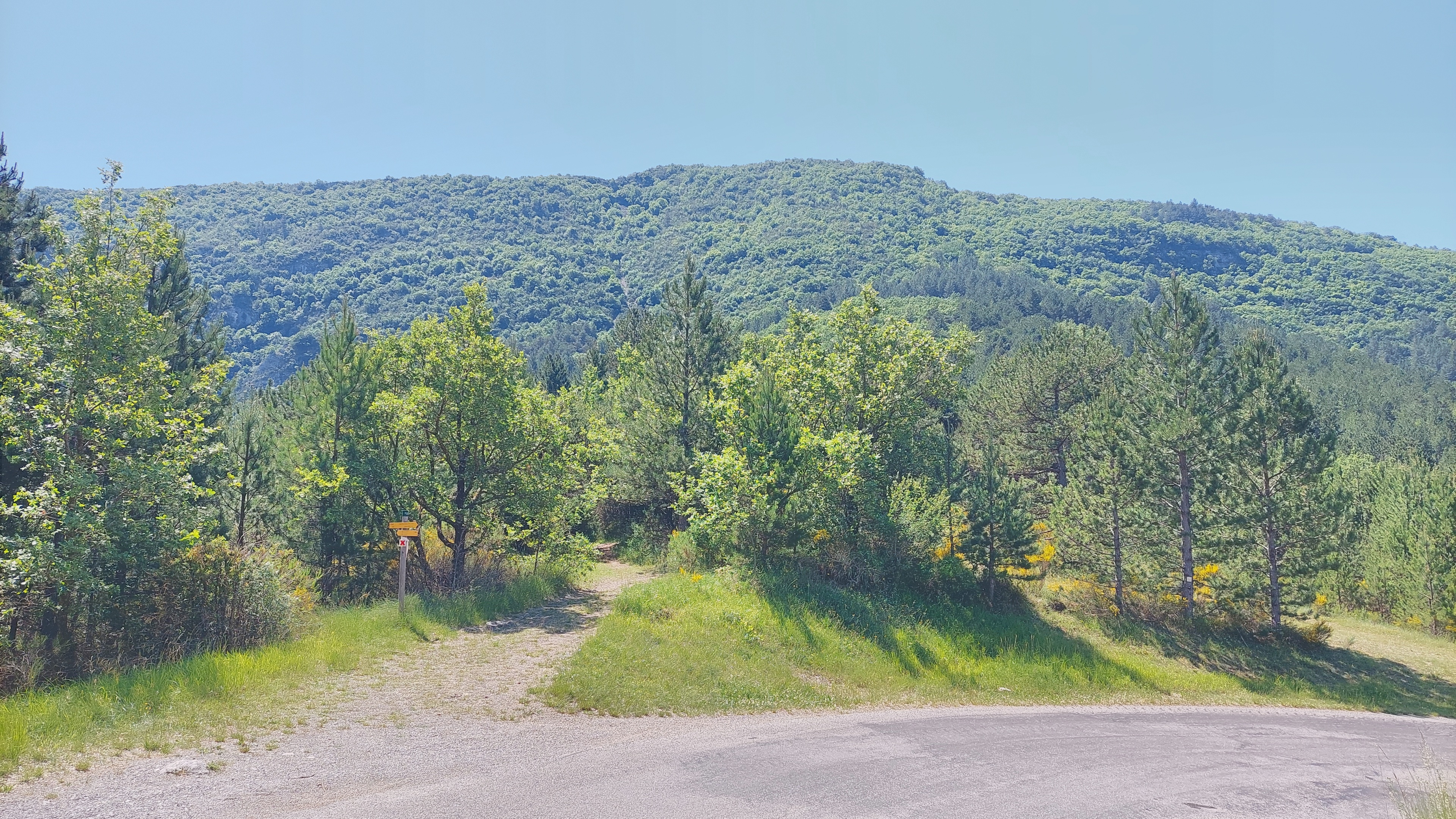
- North side of Montagne de la Baume as seen from Col de Mézien

Highest point
- Elevation: 1,147 m (3,763 ft)
- Prominence: 333 m (1,093 ft)
- Parent peak: Montagne de la Gache (line parent)
- Isolation: 3.15 km (1.96 mi) to Rochers de Saint Michel
- Coordinates: 44°11′55.637″N 5°58′23.279″E

Geography
- Location within France
- Location: Entrepierres and Sisteron, France
- Parent range: Digne Prealps

Climbing
- Easiest route: Hike

Montagne de la Baume is a mountain of the Alps in the department Alpes-de-Haute-Provence in France. It stretches between the settlements of Sisteron to its west, from which it is separated by the river Durance, and Entrepierres to its east. At Sisteron, it ends with the vertically fissured rocky wall Falaise de la Baume. Its key col is Col de Mézien (elevation: 814 metres (2,671 ft)) to the north of its summit. The southern climbing route to the summit of Montagne de la Baume passes through the cave Grotte du Trou de l'Argent.

== Climbing routes ==
The summit of Montagne de la Baume can be reached via a southern route starting in the west at the settlement of Sisteron and passing through the cave Grotte du Trou de l'Argent. Alternatively, it can be reached via a northern route starting at Sisteron and passing Col de Mézien.

=== Southern route ===
The trail to the summit of Montagne de la Baume starts immediately at the foot of Falaise de la Baume. The trail towards the beginning of the summit area has a gravel surface, is comfortably wide and well maintained. It is a normal uphill hike. South of the summit, a steeper trail branches off towards the summit in the north. Its surface is a ground/gravel mixture and therefore, it is possible to slip occasionally. Below the rocky wall of the summit, the trail bends to the east and, after about 50 metres (160 ft), the entrance of the cave Grotte du Trou de l'Argent is reached. The cave acts as an approximately 100 metres (330 ft) long, in one place very narrow passageway. Since the sunlight does not shine through the whole length of the cave, having a torch is advisable. In its upper section, the southern cave wall has holes offering beautiful views towards the Durance valley. Having passed the cave, the summit rock has to be climbed over several rock steps at a length of about 100 metres (330 ft). There are steel cables installed. Yet, a head for heights and sure-footedness are advisable. Having reached the ridge, the last about 100 metres (330 ft) to the summit are not challenging. Due to the southern rocky wall of the summit area, the fall hazard should be observed at the summit.

=== Northern route ===
The northern route is easier to climb than the southern route. It is ideal for the decent. It resembles mostly a normal hiking trail and does not require particular alpine experience. The path from Sisteron in the west to Col de Mézien in the east has a ground/gravel mixture surface, is comfortably wide and mildly inclined. The final ascent from Col de Mézien to the summit is more strongly inclined. Its surface is a ground/gravel mixture as well, but with a greater proportion of earth, particularly towards the summit.

== View ==
The best view is offered through the holes in the southern wall of in the upper section of Grotte du Trou de l'Argent and when climbing the summit rock after having passed the cave. The summit of Montagne de la Baume is densely wooded. Due to the southern rocky wall, it offers some view to the south and southwest. It does not offer a view into other directions.

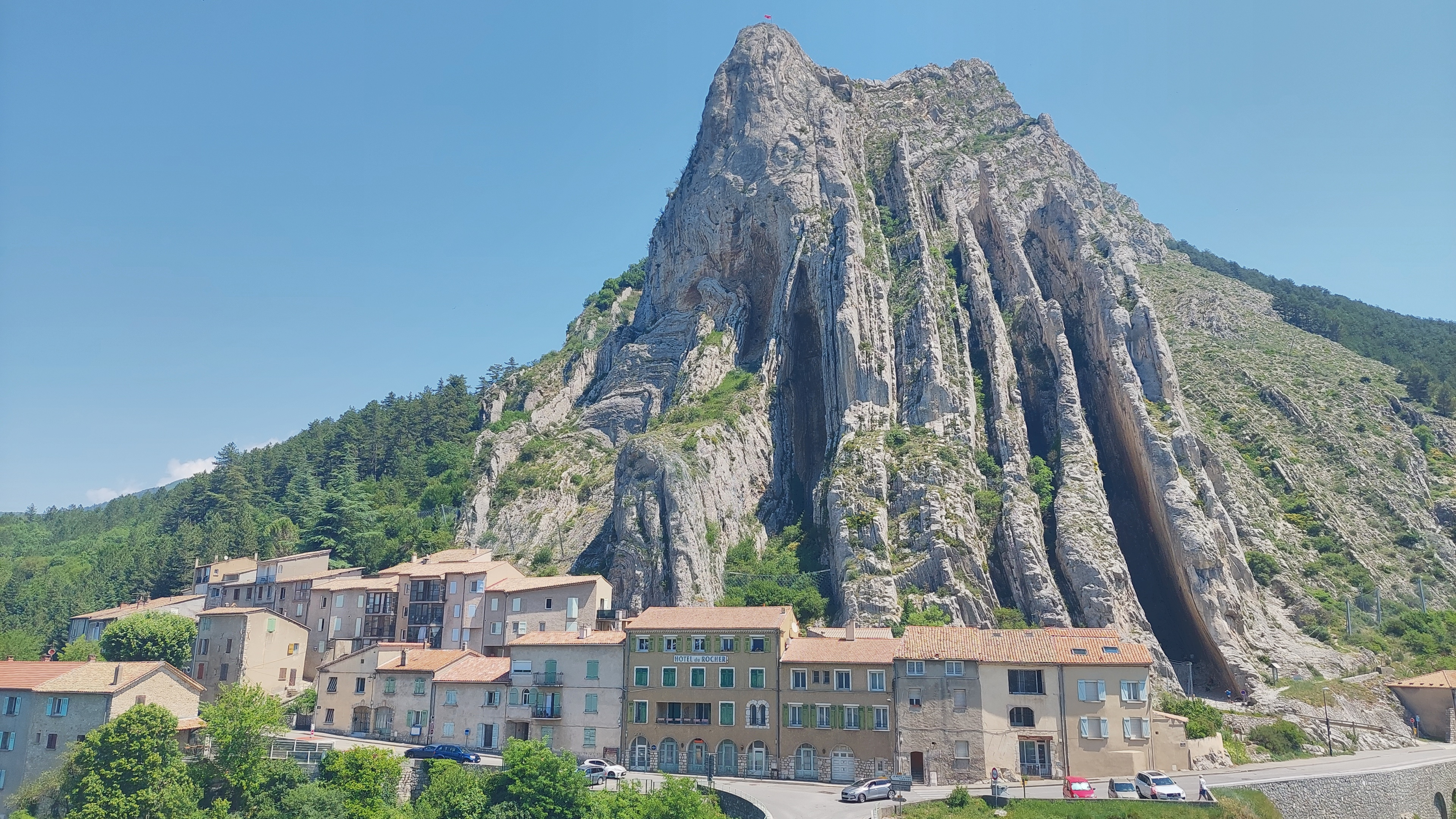
Falaise de la Baume, view from west across Durance.

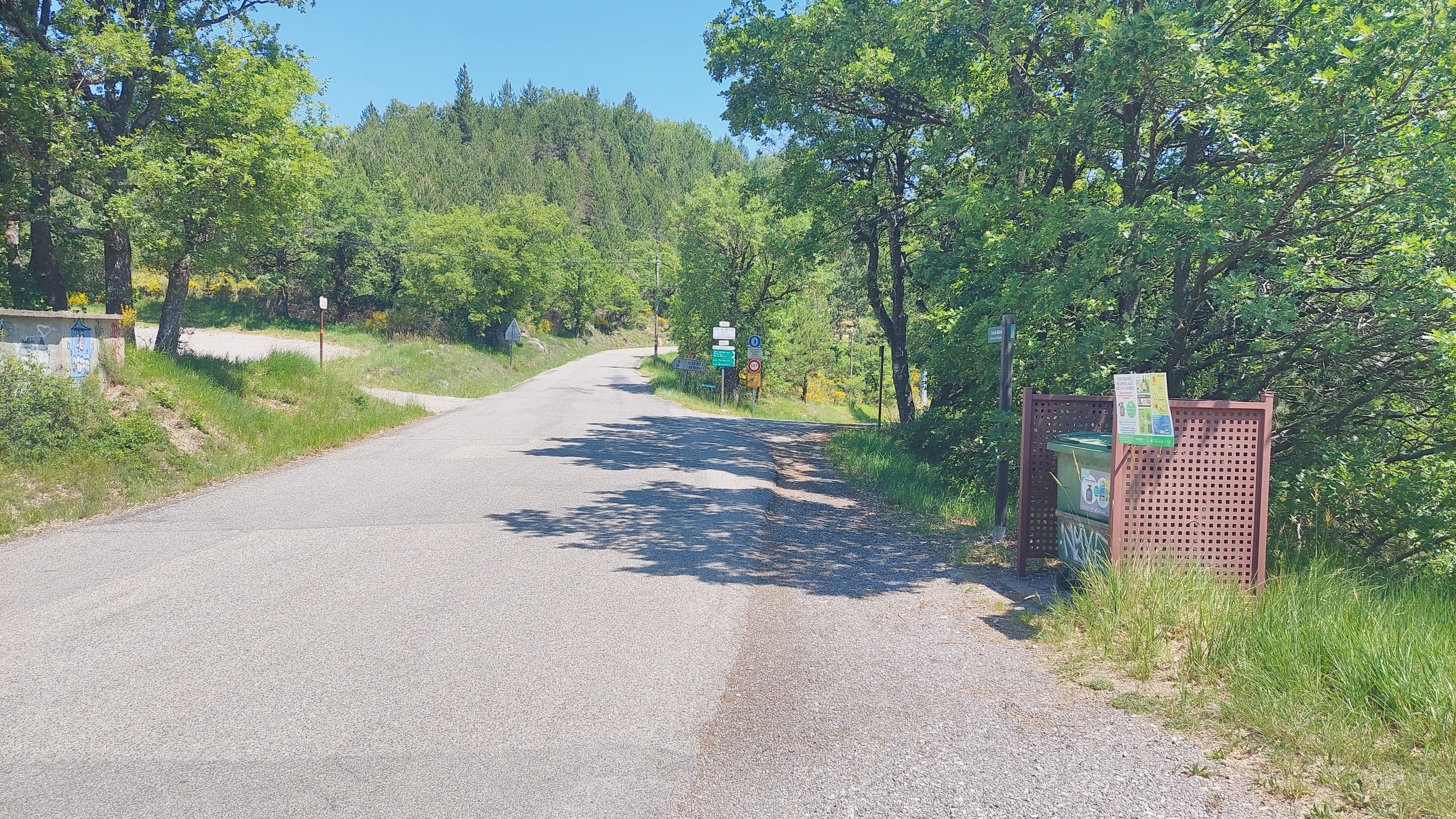
Col de Mézien, the key col of Montagne de la Baume, view from west.

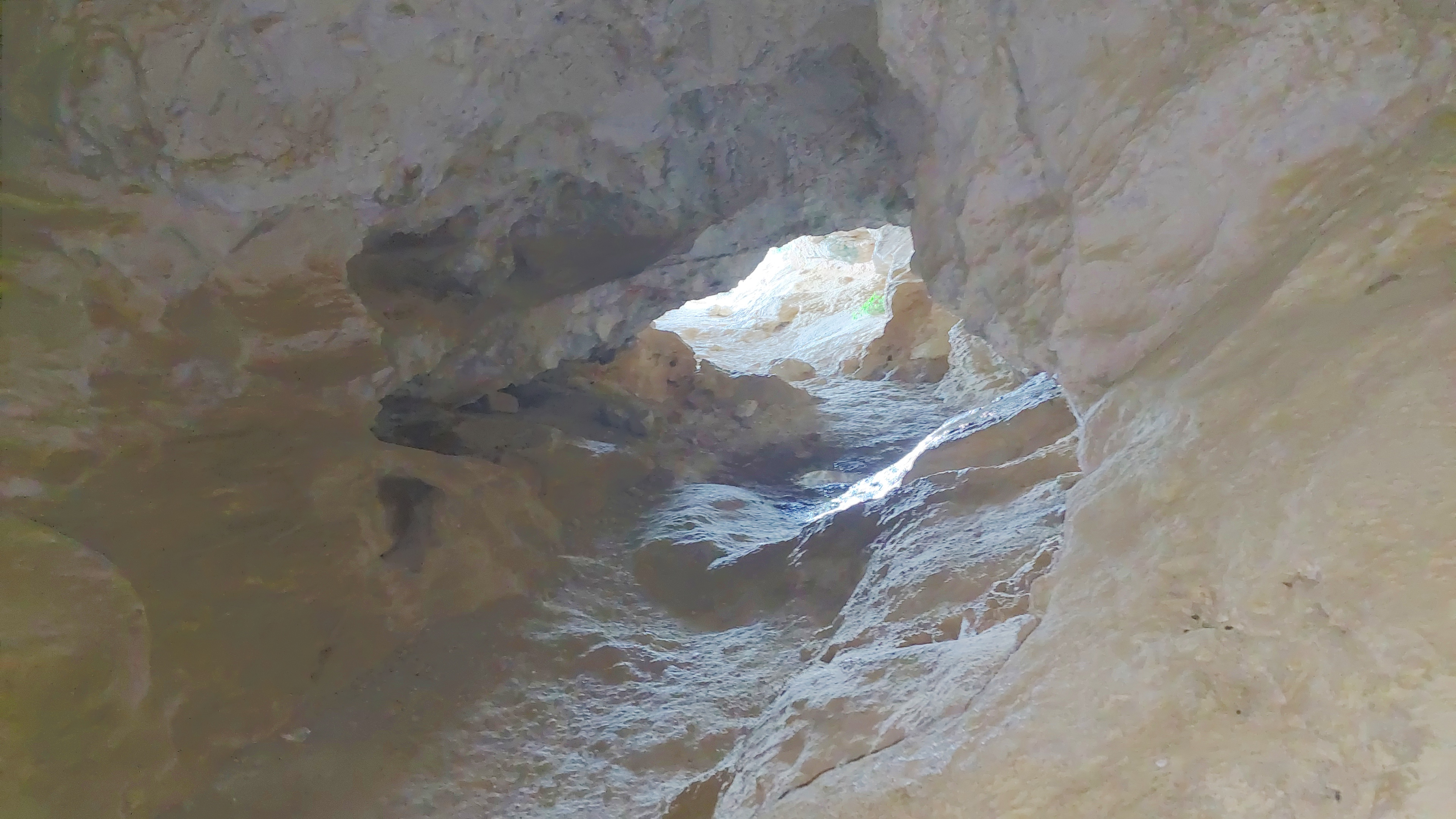
Passageway through the Grotte du Trou de l'Argent.

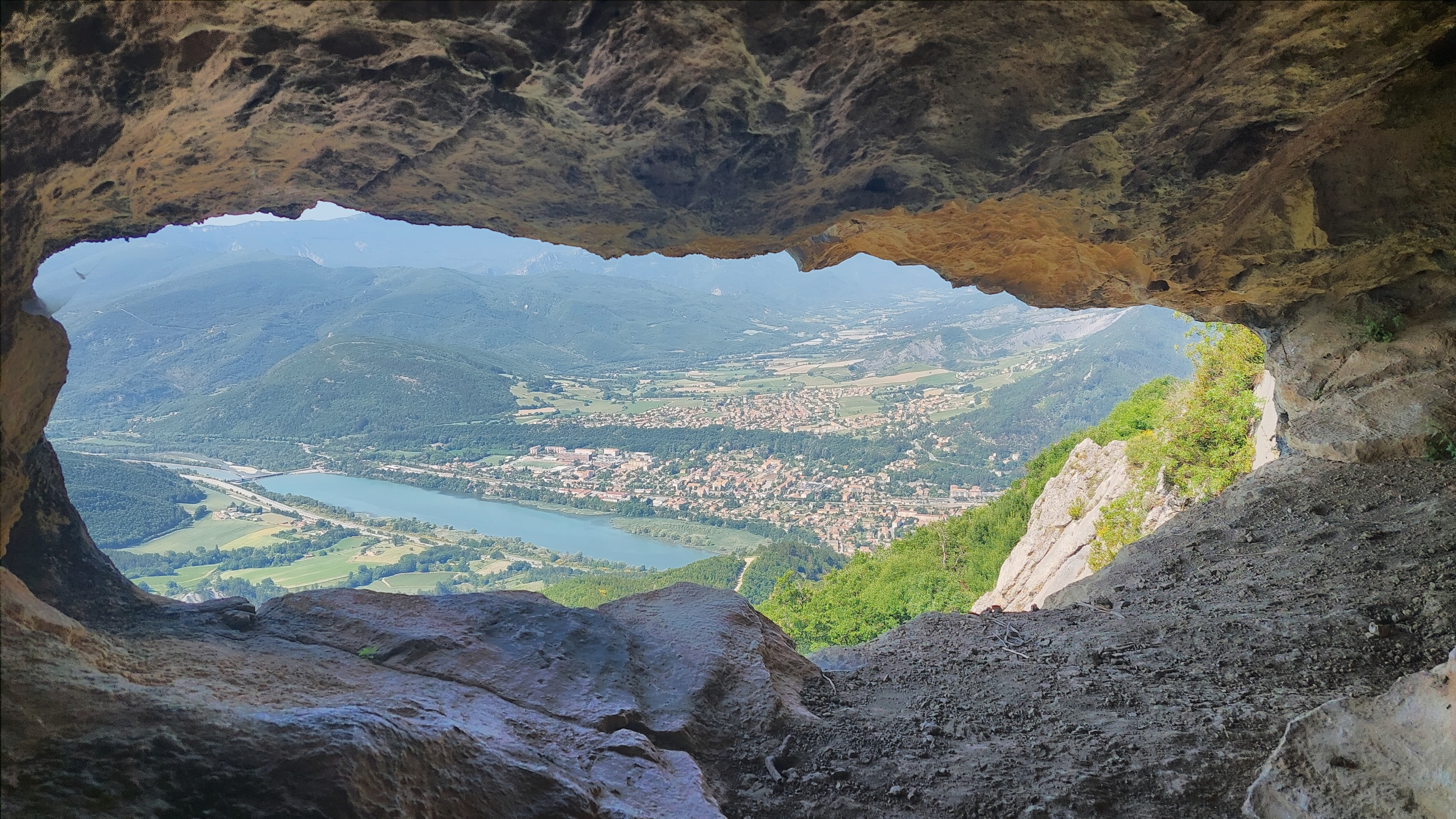
View through one of the holes in the southern wall of Grotte du Trou de l'Argent.

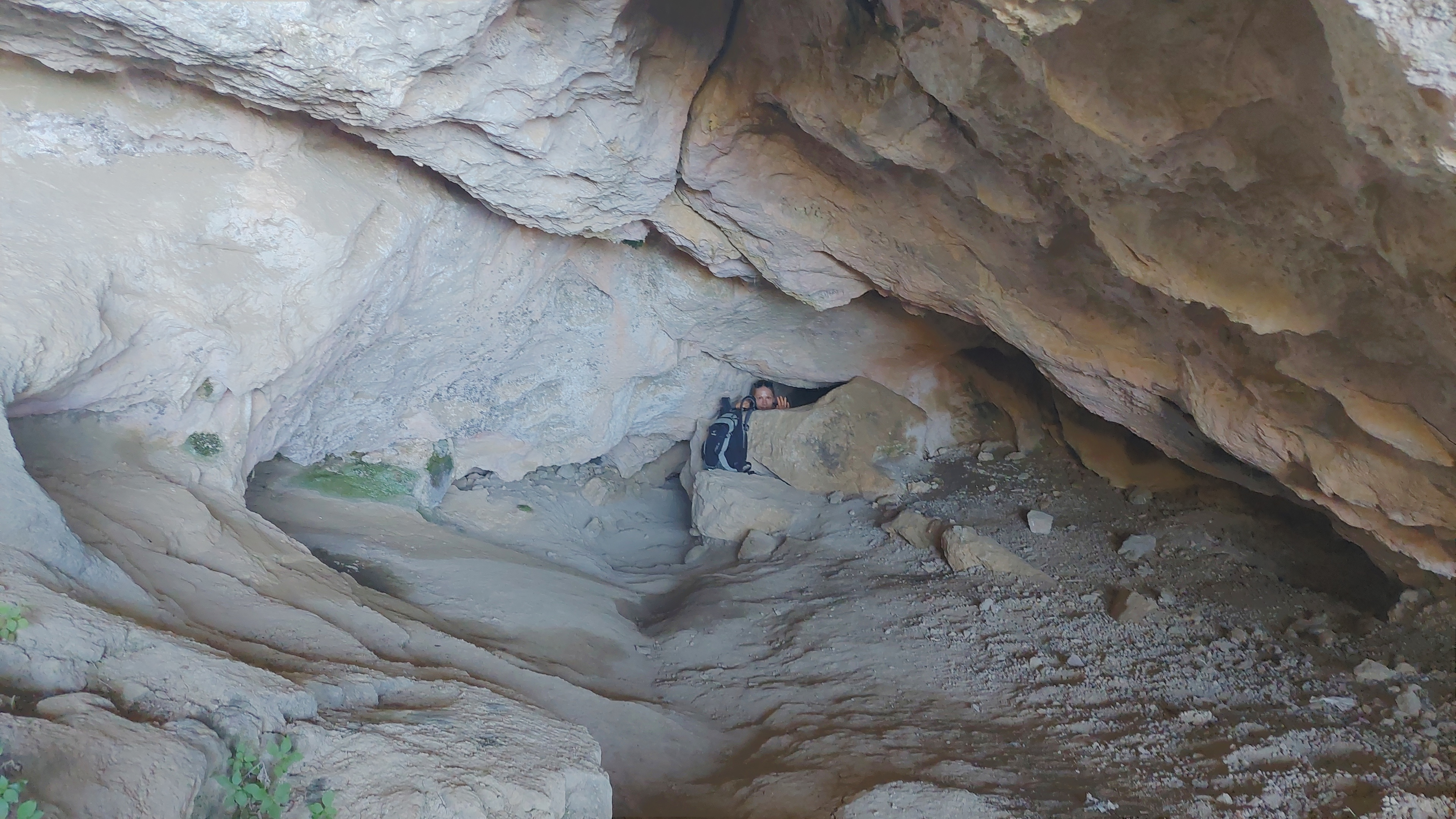
Most narrow point of Grotte du Trou de l'Argent. One has to move through the hole to the left of the backpack.
