= Venterol =

Venterol is the name of 2 communes in France:

- Venterol, in the Alpes-de-Haute-Provence department
- Venterol, in the Drôme department
