= Thèze =

Thèze is the name of 2 communes in France:

- Thèze, in the Alpes-de-Haute-Provence department
- Thèze, in the Pyrénées-Atlantiques department
