= Châteaufort =

Châteaufort (pronounced [ʃɑtofɔʁ]) is the name of two communes in France:

- Châteaufort, Alpes-de-Haute-Provence, in the Alpes-de-Haute-Provence département
- Châteaufort, Yvelines, in the Yvelines département
