= Saint-Martin-les-Eaux =

- Commune
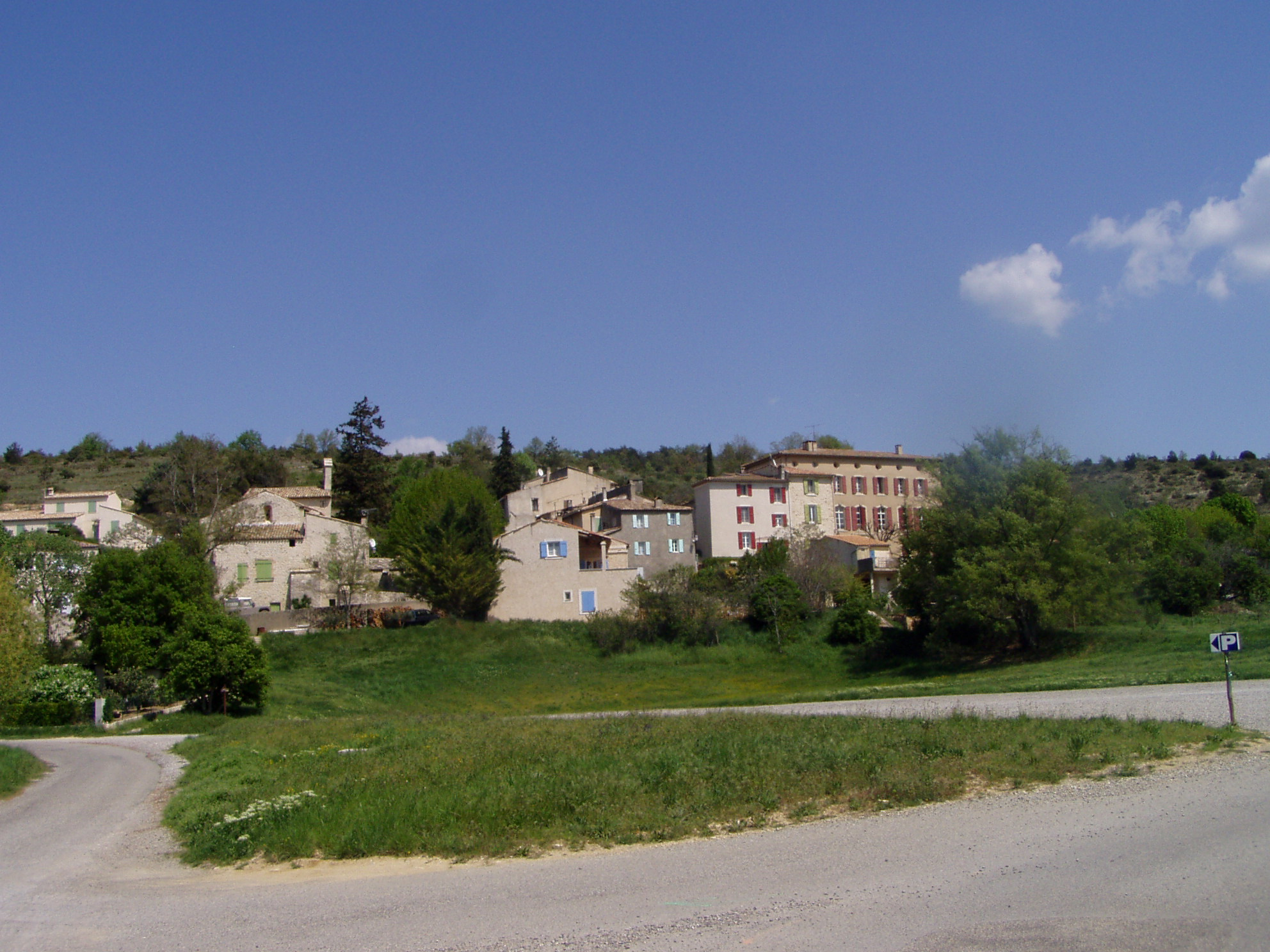
- A general view of the village of Saint-Martin-les-Eaux
- Location of Saint-Martin-les-Eaux
- Location within France Location within Provence-Alpes-Côte d'Azur
- Coordinates: 43°52′31″N 5°44′09″E
- Country: France
- Region: Provence-Alpes-Côte d'Azur
- Department: Alpes-de-Haute-Provence
- Arrondissement: Forcalquier
- Canton: Manosque-2
- Intercommunality: Haute-Provence-Pays de Banon

Government
  - Mayor (2026–32): Sylvie Rouze
- Area^{1}: 9.15 km^{2} (3.53 sq mi)
- Elevation: 500 m (1,600 ft)
- Highest elevation: 705 m (2,313 ft)
- Lowest elevation: 395 m (1,296 ft)
- Population (2023): 120
  - Density: 13/km^{2} (34/sq mi)
- Time zone: UTC+01:00 (CET)
  - Summer (DST): UTC+02:00 (CEST)
- INSEE/Postal code: 04190 /04300
- ^{1} French Land Register data, which excludes lakes, ponds, glaciers > 1 km^{2} (0.386 sq mi or 247 acres) and river estuaries.

Saint-Martin-les-Eaux (French pronunciation: [sɛ̃ maʁtɛ̃ le.z‿o]; Provençal: Sant Martin deis Aigas) is a commune in the Alpes-de-Haute-Provence department in southeastern France.

== Population ==
Historical population
| Year | Pop. | ±% p.a. |
|---|---|---|
| 1968 | 31 | — |
| 1975 | 24 | −3.59% |
| 1982 | 37 | +6.38% |
| 1990 | 69 | +8.10% |
| 1999 | 104 | +4.66% |
| 2007 | 100 | −0.49% |
| 2012 | 110 | +1.92% |
| 2017 | 114 | +0.72% |
| 2023 | 120 | +0.86% |
Source: INSEE

== See also ==
- Luberon
- Communes of the Alpes-de-Haute-Provence department
