= Sourribes =

- Commune
- Coat of arms
- Location of Sourribes
- Location within France Location within Provence-Alpes-Côte d'Azur
- Coordinates: 44°08′58″N 6°00′58″E
- Country: France
- Region: Provence-Alpes-Côte d'Azur
- Department: Alpes-de-Haute-Provence
- Arrondissement: Forcalquier
- Canton: Sisteron
- Intercommunality: Jabron Lure Vançon Durance

Government
  - Mayor (2026–32): Patrick Heyries
- Area^{1}: 19.75 km^{2} (7.63 sq mi)
- Elevation: 420 m (1,380 ft)
- Highest elevation: 1,438 m (4,718 ft)
- Lowest elevation: 467 m (1,532 ft)
- Population (2023): 174
  - Density: 8.81/km^{2} (22.8/sq mi)
- Time zone: UTC+01:00 (CET)
  - Summer (DST): UTC+02:00 (CEST)
- INSEE/Postal code: 04211 /04290
- ^{1} French Land Register data, which excludes lakes, ponds, glaciers > 1 km^{2} (0.386 sq mi or 247 acres) and river estuaries.

Sourribes (French pronunciation: [suʁib]; Occitan: Soribas) is a commune in the Alpes-de-Haute-Provence department in southeastern France.

== Population ==
Historical population
Year	Pop.	±% p.a.
1968	73	—
1975	75	+0.39%
1982	74	−0.19%
1990	116	+5.78%
1999	138	+1.95%
2007	176	+3.09%
2012	177	+0.11%
2017	179	+0.22%
2023	174	−0.47%
Source: INSEE

== Geography ==
The town is crossed by the Vançon. The village is situated 420 m above sea level. Beaudu caves.

== History ==
Roman ruins are found to Beaudu. Several discoveries of Roman coins have been held on the common [2].

The town appears for the first time in the charters in 739.

An abbey of Benedictine nuns was founded before 1160, and remained there until 1464 and its merger with Abbey St. Clare of Sisteron. The abbey is lord of.

The common Beaudu it annexed in 1909. The medieval community had 24 fires in the enumeration of 1315, but was deserted in 1471. In 1765, she had 68 people.

A scrub is created in 1943 it was partly made up of peasants who continued to have a normal life, but who were mobilized in two hours.

== Toponymy ==
The village's name as it appears the first time in 739 (Subtusripas), refers to its position at the foot of a rock.

== See also ==
- Communes of the Alpes-de-Haute-Provence department
