= Puimichel =

- Commune
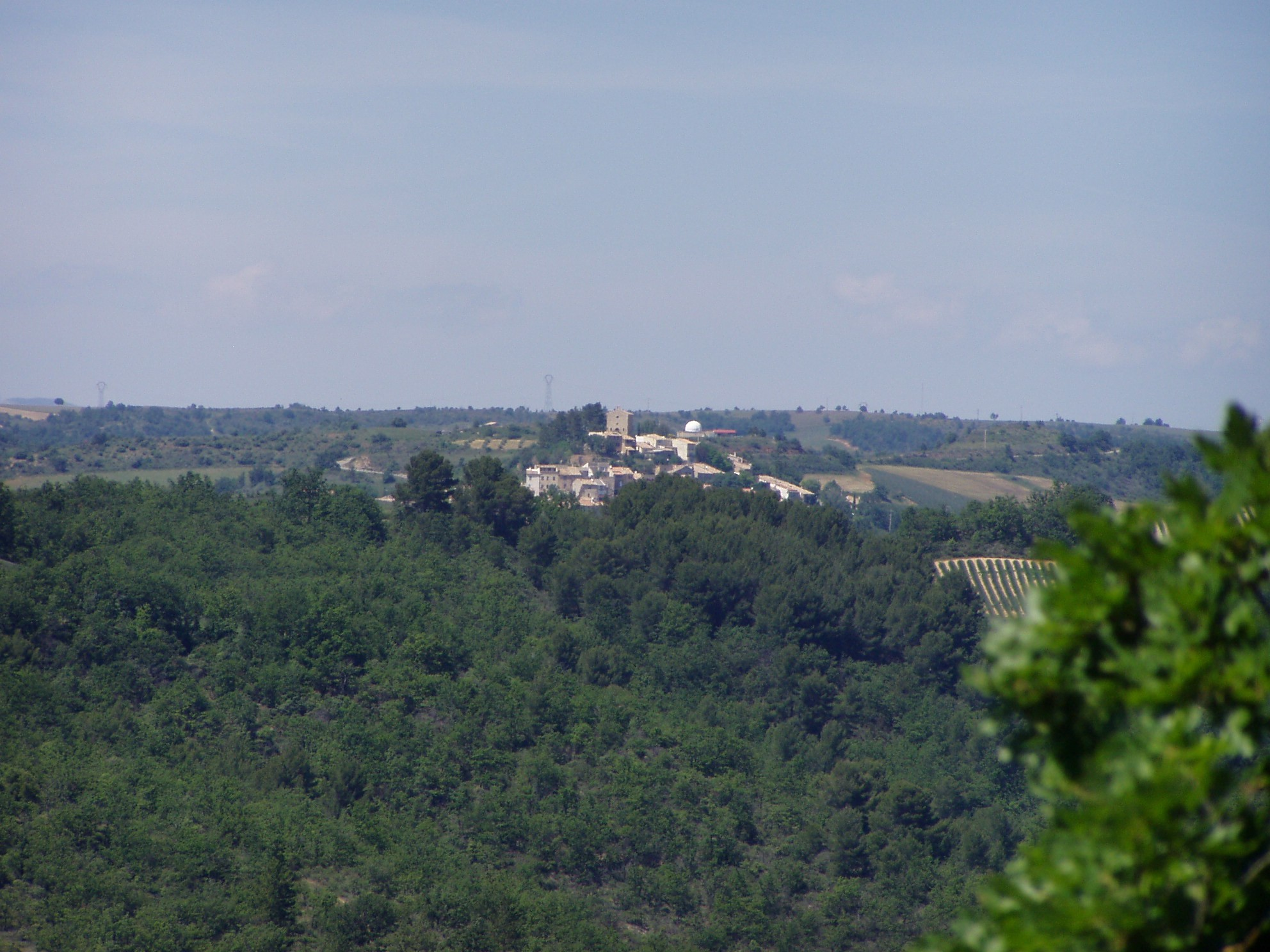
- A general view of the village of Puimichel

- Coat of arms
- Location of Puimichel
- Location within France Location within Provence-Alpes-Côte d'Azur
- Coordinates: 43°58′29″N 6°01′15″E
- Country: France
- Region: Provence-Alpes-Côte d'Azur
- Department: Alpes-de-Haute-Provence
- Arrondissement: Forcalquier
- Canton: Riez
- Intercommunality: Durance-Luberon-Verdon Agglomération

Government
  - Mayor (2026–32): François Rome
- Area^{1}: 36.81 km^{2} (14.21 sq mi)
- Elevation: 700 m (2,300 ft)
- Highest elevation: 884 m (2,900 ft)
- Lowest elevation: 486 m (1,594 ft)
- Population (2023): 246
  - Density: 6.68/km^{2} (17.3/sq mi)
- Time zone: UTC+01:00 (CET)
  - Summer (DST): UTC+02:00 (CEST)
- INSEE/Postal code: 04156 /04700
- ^{1} French Land Register data, which excludes lakes, ponds, glaciers > 1 km^{2} (0.386 sq mi or 247 acres) and river estuaries.

Puimichel (French pronunciation: [pɥimiʃɛl]; Occitan: Puegmichèu) is a commune in the Alpes-de-Haute-Provence department in southeastern France.

== Population ==
Historical population
Year	Pop.	±% p.a.
1968	161	—
1975	147	−1.29%
1982	194	+4.04%
1990	203	+0.57%
1999	237	+1.74%
2007	254	+0.87%
2012	220	−2.83%
2017	247	+2.34%
2023	246	−0.07%
Source: INSEE

== See also ==
- Communes of the Alpes-de-Haute-Provence department
