= Communes of the Alpes-de-Haute-Provence department =

The following is a list of the 198 communes of the Alpes-de-Haute-Provence department of France.

Location of the Alpes-de-Haute-Provence within France

The communes cooperate in the following intercommunalities (as of 2025):

- Communauté d'agglomération Durance-Luberon-Verdon Agglomération (partly)
- Communauté d'agglomération Gap-Tallard-Durance (partly)
- Communauté d'agglomération Provence-Alpes
- Communauté de communes Alpes Provence Verdon - Sources de Lumière
- Communauté de communes Haute-Provence Pays de Banon
- Communauté de communes Jabron Lure Vançon Durance (partly)
- Communauté de communes Pays d'Apt-Luberon (partly)
- Communauté de communes Pays de Forcalquier - Montagne de Lure
- Communauté de communes de Serre-Ponçon (partly)
- Communauté de communes Serre-Ponçon Val d'Avance (partly)
- Communauté de communes du Sisteronais Buëch (partly)
- Communauté de communes Vallée de l'Ubaye Serre-Ponçon

INSEE	Postal	Commune
04001	04510	Aiglun
04004	04500	Allemagne-en-Provence
04005	04170	Allons
04006	04260	Allos
04007	04170	Angles
04008	04240	Annot
04009	04420	Archail
04012	04110	Aubenas-les-Alpes
04013	04200	Aubignosc
04016	04200	Authon
04017	04140	Auzet
04018	04150	Banon
04019	04400	Barcelonnette
04020	04140	Barles
04021	04380	Barras
04022	04330	Barrême
04023	04250	Bayons
04024	04420	Beaujeu
04025	04370	Beauvezer
04026	04250	Bellaffaire
04027	04200	Bevons
04028	04270	Beynes
04030	04330	Blieux
04031	04270	Bras-d'Asse
04032	04240	Braux
04034	04700	La Brillanne
04035	04210	Brunet
04036	04420	Le Brusquet
04037	04250	Le Caire
04039	04120	Castellane
04040	04380	Le Castellard-Mélan
04041	04700	Le Castellet
04042	04320	Castellet-lès-Sausses
04045	04280	Céreste
04046	04510	Le Chaffaut-Saint-Jurson
04047	04660	Champtercier
04049	04600	Château-Arnoux-Saint-Auban
04050	04250	Châteaufort
04051	04200	Châteauneuf-Miravail
04053	04200	Châteauneuf-Val-Saint-Donat
04054	04270	Châteauredon
04055	04330	Chaudon-Norante
04057	04250	Clamensane
04058	05110	Claret
04059	04330	Clumanc
04061	04370	Colmars
04062	04530	La Condamine-Châtelard
04063	04220	Corbières-en-Provence
04065	04230	Cruis
04066	05110	Curbans
04067	04200	Curel
04068	04300	Dauphin
04069	04120	Demandolx
04070	04000	Digne-les-Bains
04072	04420	Draix
04073	04400	Enchastrayes
04074	04000	Entrages
04075	04200	Entrepierres
04076	04320	Entrevaux
04077	04700	Entrevennes
04079	04160	L'Escale
04081	04800	Esparron-de-Verdon
04084	04270	Estoublon
04086	04400	Faucon-de-Barcelonnette
04085	04250	Faucon-du-Caire
04087	04230	Fontienne
04088	04300	Forcalquier
04090	04240	Le Fugeret
04091	04310	Ganagobie
04092	04120	La Garde
04093	04250	Gigors
04094	04800	Gréoux-les-Bains
04177	04380	Hautes-Duyes
04095	04150	L'Hospitalet
04096	04850	Jausiers
04097	04420	La Javie
04099	04170	Lambruisse
04101	04230	Lardiers
04102	04340	Le Lauzet-Ubaye
04104	04300	Limans
04106	04700	Lurs
04107	04270	Majastres
04108	04350	Malijai
04109	04230	Mallefougasse-Augès
04110	04510	Mallemoisson
04111	04300	Mane
04112	04100	Manosque
04113	04420	Marcoux
04115	04240	Méailles
04116	04190	Les Mées
04118	04250	Melve
04161	04340	Méolans-Revel
04121	04270	Mézel
04122	04510	Mirabeau
04123	04200	Mison
04124	04500	Montagnac-Montpezat
04126	04140	Montclar

INSEE	Postal	Commune
04127	04600	Montfort
04128	04110	Montfuron
04129	04110	Montjustin
04130	04230	Montlaux
04132	04150	Montsalier
04133	04170	Moriez
04134	04250	La Motte-du-Caire
04135	04360	Moustiers-Sainte-Marie
04136	04170	La Mure-Argens
04137	04250	Nibles
04138	04300	Niozelles
04139	04200	Noyers-sur-Jabron
04140	04200	Les Omergues
04141	04230	Ongles
04142	04110	Oppedette
04143	04700	Oraison
04144	04120	La Palud-sur-Verdon
04145	04200	Peipin
04148	04120	Peyroules
04149	04310	Peyruis
04150	05130	Piégut
04151	04300	Pierrerue
04152	04860	Pierrevert
04154	05160	Pontis
04155	04420	Prads-Haute-Bléone
04156	04700	Puimichel
04157	04410	Puimoisson
04158	04500	Quinson
04159	04150	Redortiers
04160	04110	Reillanne
04162	04150	Revest-des-Brousses
04163	04150	Revest-du-Bion
04164	04230	Revest-Saint-Martin
04166	04500	Riez
04167	04000	La Robine-sur-Galabre
04169	04150	La Rochegiron
04170	06260	La Rochette
04171	04120	Rougon
04172	04500	Roumoules
04173	04170	Saint-André-les-Alpes
04174	04240	Saint-Benoît
04175	04110	Sainte-Croix-à-Lauze
04176	04500	Sainte-Croix-du-Verdon
04178	04230	Saint-Étienne-les-Orgues
04197	04220	Sainte-Tulle
04179	04200	Saint-Geniez
04180	04330	Saint-Jacques
04181	04270	Saint-Jeannet
04182	04270	Saint-Julien-d'Asse
04183	04170	Saint-Julien-du-Verdon
04184	04410	Saint-Jurs
04186	04500	Saint-Laurent-du-Verdon
04187	04330	Saint-Lions
04188	04300	Saint-Maime
04189	04800	Saint-Martin-de-Brômes
04190	04300	Saint-Martin-les-Eaux
04191	04140	Saint-Martin-lès-Seyne
04192	04870	Saint-Michel-l'Observatoire
04193	04530	Saint-Paul-sur-Ubaye
04194	06260	Saint-Pierre
04195	04400	Saint-Pons
04199	04200	Saint-Vincent-sur-Jabron
04200	04290	Salignac
04201	04150	Saumane
04202	04320	Sausses
04203	04140	Selonnet
04204	04330	Senez
04205	04140	Seyne
04206	04300	Sigonce
04207	04200	Sigoyer
04208	04150	Simiane-la-Rotonde
04209	04200	Sisteron
04210	04120	Soleilhas
04211	04290	Sourribes
04214	04330	Tartonne
04216	04200	Thèze
04217	04380	Thoard
04218	04170	Thorame-Basse
04219	04170	Thorame-Haute
04220	04400	Les Thuiles
04222	04250	Turriers
04033	04340	Ubaye-Serre-Ponçon
04224	04240	Ubraye
04226	04400	Uvernet-Fours
04227	04110	Vachères
04228	04250	Valavoire
04229	04200	Valbelle
04043	04320	Val-de-Chalvagne
04120	04530	Val-d'Oronaye
04230	04210	Valensole
04231	04200	Valernes
04233	04200	Vaumeilh
04234	05130	Venterol
04235	04140	Verdaches
04236	04170	Vergons
04237	04140	Le Vernet
04240	04370	Villars-Colmars
04241	04110	Villemus
04242	04180	Villeneuve
04244	04290	Volonne
04245	04130	Volx
