= Montclar, Alpes-de-Haute-Provence =

Montclar
- Commune
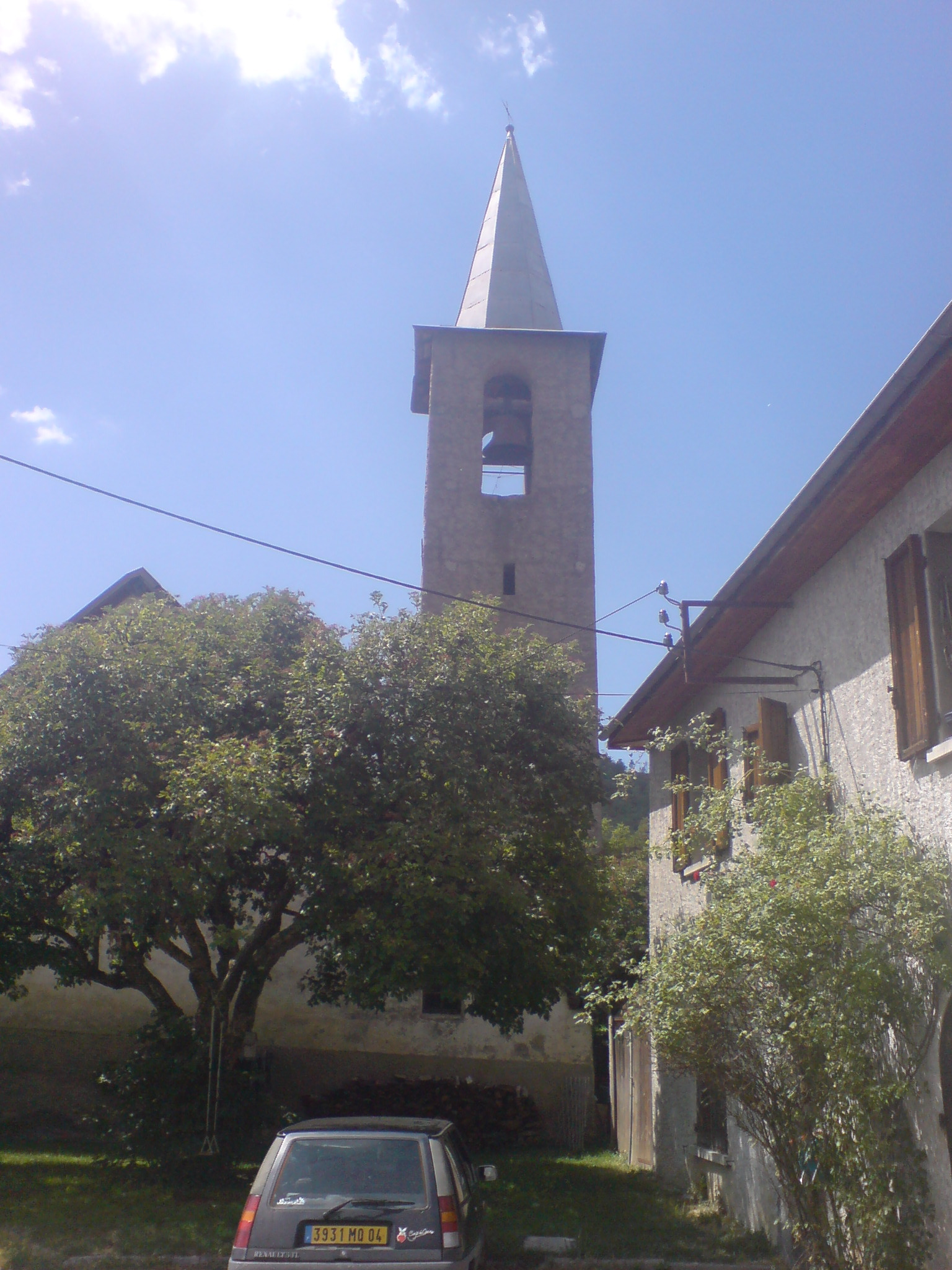
- The church of Saint-Michel, in Serre Nauzet

- Coat of arms
- Location of Montclar
- Location within France Location within Provence-Alpes-Côte d'Azur
- Coordinates: 44°23′52″N 6°20′18″E
- Country: France
- Region: Provence-Alpes-Côte d'Azur
- Department: Alpes-de-Haute-Provence
- Arrondissement: Digne-les-Bains
- Canton: Seyne
- Intercommunality: CA Provence-Alpes

Government
  - Mayor (2026–32): François Bouyala
- Area^{1}: 23.38 km^{2} (9.03 sq mi)
- Elevation: 1,120 m (3,670 ft)
- Highest elevation: 2,500 m (8,200 ft)
- Lowest elevation: 1,082 m (3,550 ft)
- Population (2023): 394
  - Density: 16.9/km^{2} (43.6/sq mi)
- Time zone: UTC+01:00 (CET)
  - Summer (DST): UTC+02:00 (CEST)
- INSEE/Postal code: 04126 /04140
- ^{1} French Land Register data, which excludes lakes, ponds, glaciers > 1 km^{2} (0.386 sq mi or 247 acres) and river estuaries.

Montclar (French pronunciation: [mɔ̃klaʁ]) is a commune in the Alpes-de-Haute-Provence department in southeastern France.

== Population ==
Historical population
Year	Pop.	±% p.a.
1968	204	—
1975	220	+1.08%
1982	258	+2.30%
1990	327	+3.01%
1999	399	+2.24%
2007	454	+1.63%
2012	455	+0.04%
2017	414	−1.87%
2023	394	−0.82%
Source: INSEE

== See also ==
- Communes of the Alpes-de-Haute-Provence department
