= Sainte-Croix-à-Lauze =

- Commune
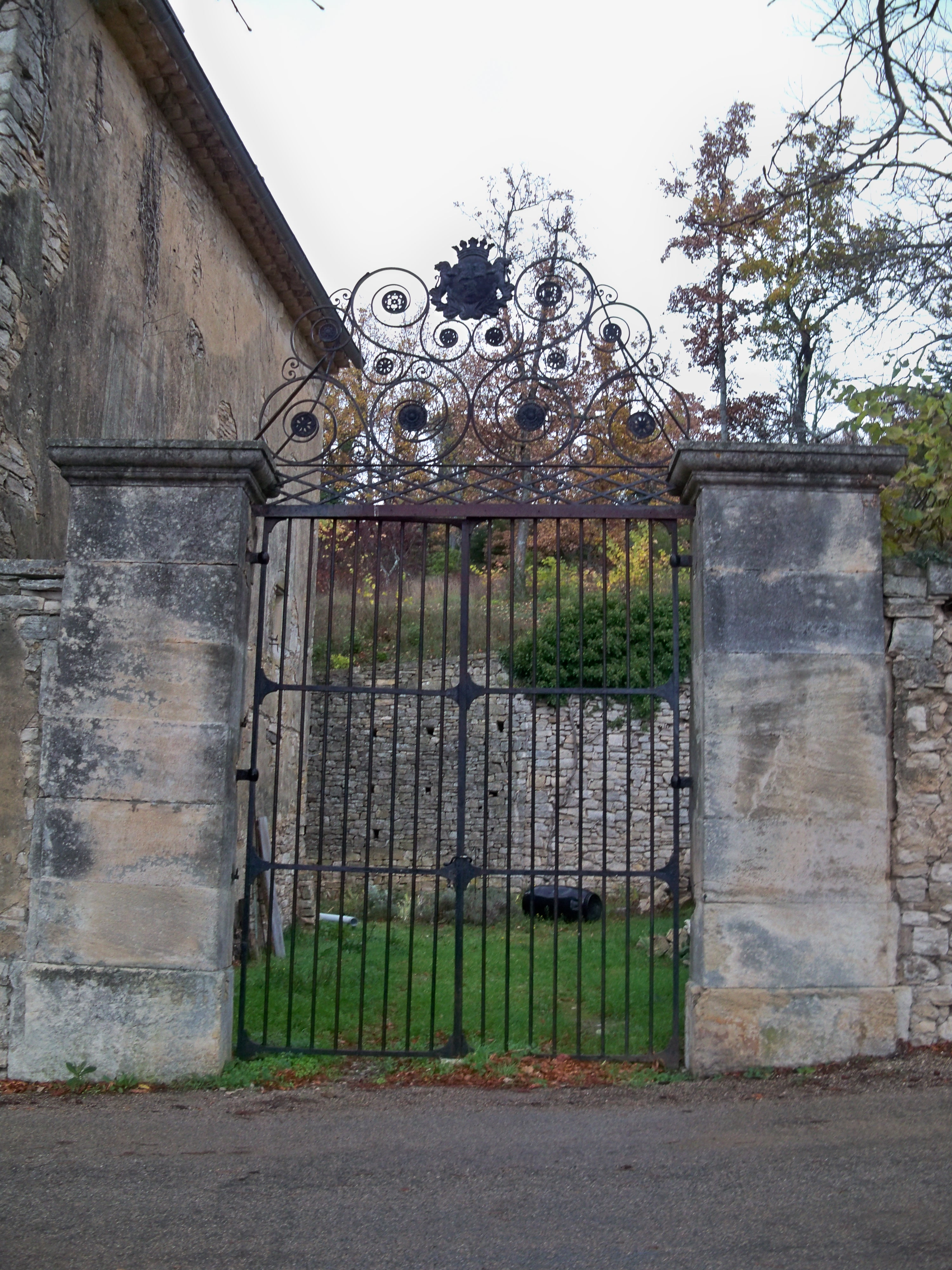
- Gate of the chateau

- Coat of arms
- Location of Sainte-Croix-à-Lauze
- Location within France Location within Provence-Alpes-Côte d'Azur
- Coordinates: 43°54′34″N 5°37′05″E
- Country: France
- Region: Provence-Alpes-Côte d'Azur
- Department: Alpes-de-Haute-Provence
- Arrondissement: Forcalquier
- Canton: Reillanne

Government
  - Mayor (2026–32): Sébastien Bardouin
- Area^{1}: 8.65 km^{2} (3.34 sq mi)
- Elevation: 600 m (2,000 ft)
- Highest elevation: 793 m (2,602 ft)
- Lowest elevation: 374 m (1,227 ft)
- Population (2023): 87
  - Density: 10/km^{2} (26/sq mi)
- Time zone: UTC+01:00 (CET)
  - Summer (DST): UTC+02:00 (CEST)
- INSEE/Postal code: 04175 /04110
- ^{1} French Land Register data, which excludes lakes, ponds, glaciers > 1 km^{2} (0.386 sq mi or 247 acres) and river estuaries.

Sainte-Croix-à-Lauze (French pronunciation: [sɛ̃t kʁwa a loz]; Provençal: Santa Crotz d'Alausa) is a commune in the Alpes-de-Haute-Provence department in southeastern France.

== Population ==
Historical population
Year	Pop.	±% p.a.
1968	35	—
1975	34	−0.41%
1982	65	+9.70%
1990	61	−0.79%
1999	72	+1.86%
2007	78	+1.01%
2012	81	+0.76%
2017	88	+1.67%
2023	87	−0.19%
Source: INSEE

== See also ==
- Communes of the Alpes-de-Haute-Provence department
