= Draix =

- Commune
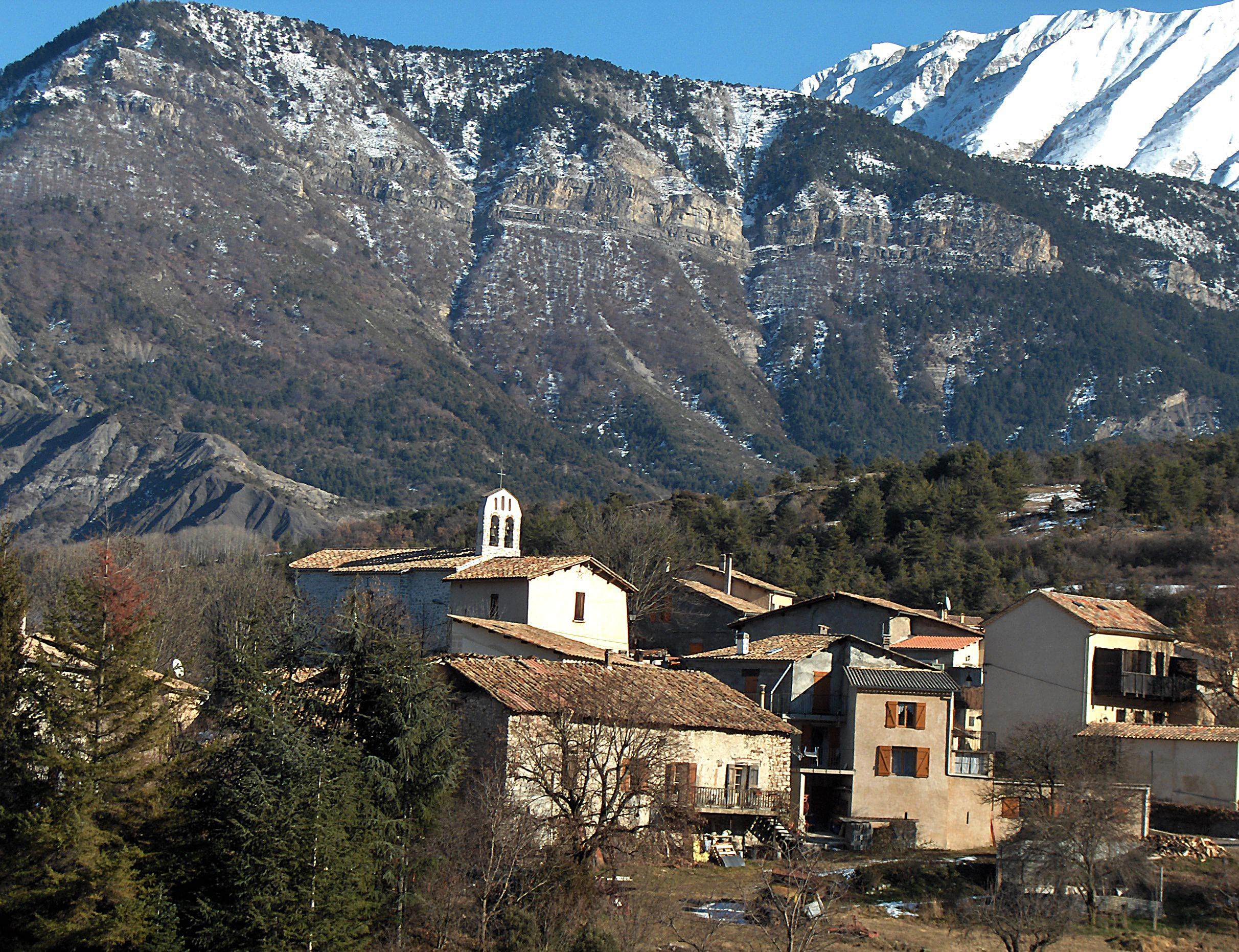
- A view of the village of Draix

- Coat of arms
- Location of Draix
- Location within France Location within Provence-Alpes-Côte d'Azur
- Coordinates: 44°08′07″N 6°20′37″E
- Country: France
- Region: Provence-Alpes-Côte d'Azur
- Department: Alpes-de-Haute-Provence
- Arrondissement: Digne-les-Bains
- Canton: Seyne
- Intercommunality: CA Provence-Alpes

Government
  - Mayor (2026–32): Victor Serra
- Area^{1}: 23.04 km^{2} (8.90 sq mi)
- Elevation: 900 m (3,000 ft)
- Highest elevation: 2,280 m (7,480 ft)
- Lowest elevation: 760 m (2,490 ft)
- Population (2023): 114
  - Density: 4.95/km^{2} (12.8/sq mi)
- Time zone: UTC+01:00 (CET)
  - Summer (DST): UTC+02:00 (CEST)
- INSEE/Postal code: 04072 /04420
- ^{1} French Land Register data, which excludes lakes, ponds, glaciers > 1 km^{2} (0.386 sq mi or 247 acres) and river estuaries.

Draix (French pronunciation: [dʁɛks]; Occitan: Drais) is a commune in the Alpes-de-Haute-Provence department in southeastern France.

== Population ==
Historical population
Year	Pop.	±% p.a.
1968	50	—
1975	81	+7.13%
1982	80	−0.18%
1990	83	+0.46%
1999	86	+0.40%
2007	74	−1.86%
2012	87	+3.29%
2017	115	+5.74%
2023	114	−0.15%
Source: INSEE

== See also ==
- Communes of the Alpes-de-Haute-Provence department
