= Niozelles =

- Commune
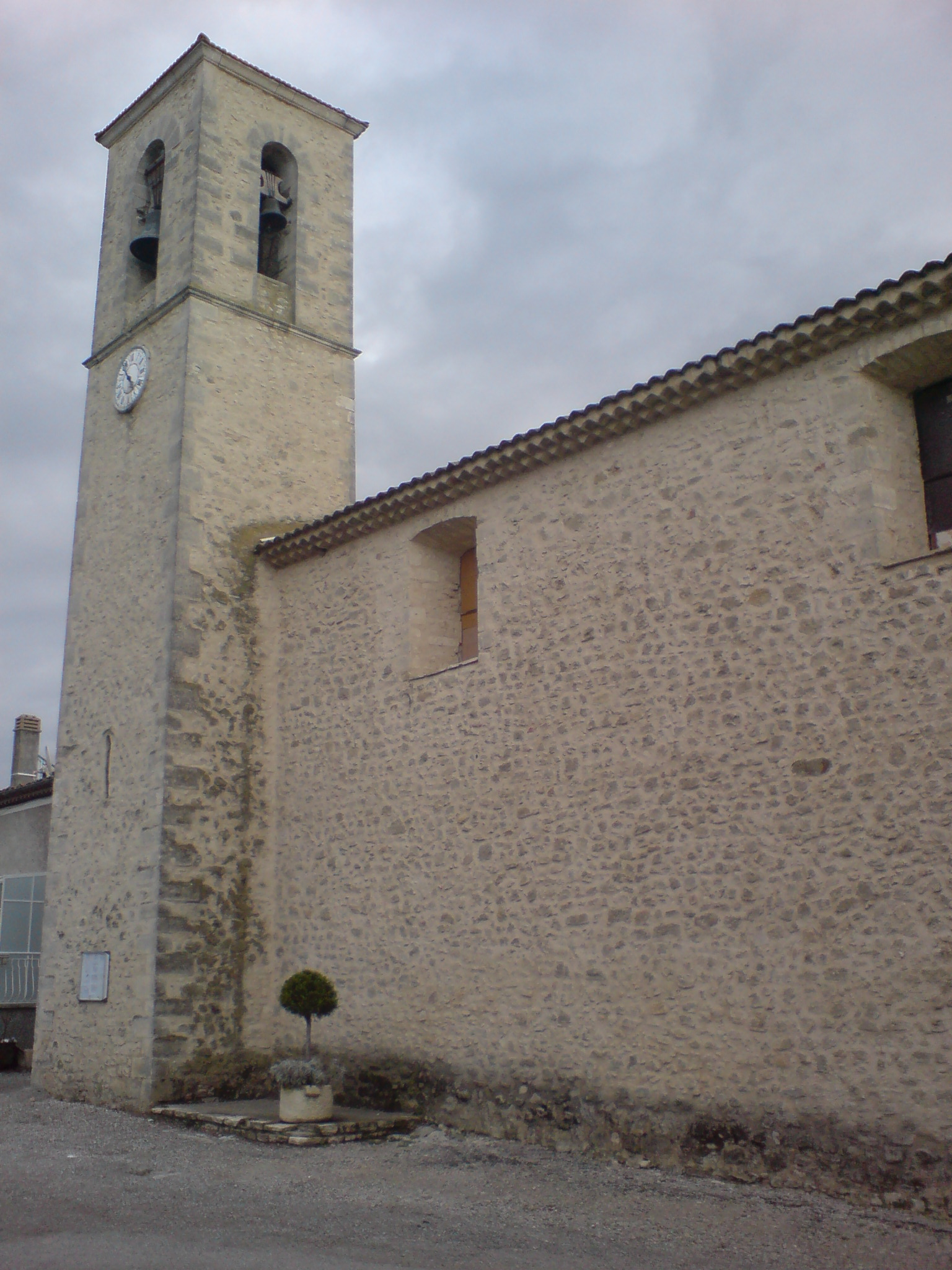
- The church in Niozelles

- Coat of arms
- Location of Niozelles
- Location within France Location within Provence-Alpes-Côte d'Azur
- Coordinates: 43°56′13″N 5°50′18″E
- Country: France
- Region: Provence-Alpes-Côte d'Azur
- Department: Alpes-de-Haute-Provence
- Arrondissement: Forcalquier
- Canton: Forcalquier
- Intercommunality: Pays de Forcalquier et Montagne de Lure

Government
  - Mayor (2026–32): Christophe Lopez
- Area^{1}: 10.47 km^{2} (4.04 sq mi)
- Elevation: 440 m (1,440 ft)
- Highest elevation: 603 m (1,978 ft)
- Lowest elevation: 354 m (1,161 ft)
- Population (2023): 274
  - Density: 26.2/km^{2} (67.8/sq mi)
- Time zone: UTC+01:00 (CET)
  - Summer (DST): UTC+02:00 (CEST)
- INSEE/Postal code: 04138 /04300
- ^{1} French Land Register data, which excludes lakes, ponds, glaciers > 1 km^{2} (0.386 sq mi or 247 acres) and river estuaries.

Niozelles (French pronunciation: [njɔzɛl]; Occitan: Nuasèlas) is a commune in the Alpes-de-Haute-Provence department in southeastern France.

== Population ==
Historical population
Year	Pop.	±% p.a.
1968	125	—
1975	106	−2.33%
1982	111	+0.66%
1990	170	+5.47%
1999	199	+1.77%
2007	233	+1.99%
2012	272	+3.14%
2017	271	−0.07%
2023	274	+0.18%
Source: INSEE

== See also ==
- Communes of the Alpes-de-Haute-Provence department
