= Canton of Manosque-2 =

Coordinates: 43.84°N 5.78°E

Manosque-2
- Canton
- Interactive map of Manosque-2
- Country: France
- Region: Provence-Alpes-Côte d'Azur
- Department: Alpes-de-Haute-Provence
- No. of communes: {{{nbcomm}}}
- Population (2023): 10,045
- INSEE code: 04 08

The canton of Manosque-2 (before March 2015: Manosque-Nord) is an administrative division in southeastern France. It consists of the northern part of the commune of Manosque and its northern suburbs. It includes the following communes:

1. Manosque (partly)
2. Saint-Martin-les-Eaux
3. Volx

== Demographics ==
Historical population
Year	Pop.	±% p.a.
2013	10,386	—
2018	10,154	−0.45%
Source: INSEE

== See also ==
- Cantons of the Alpes-de-Haute-Provence department
