= Entrepierres =

- Commune
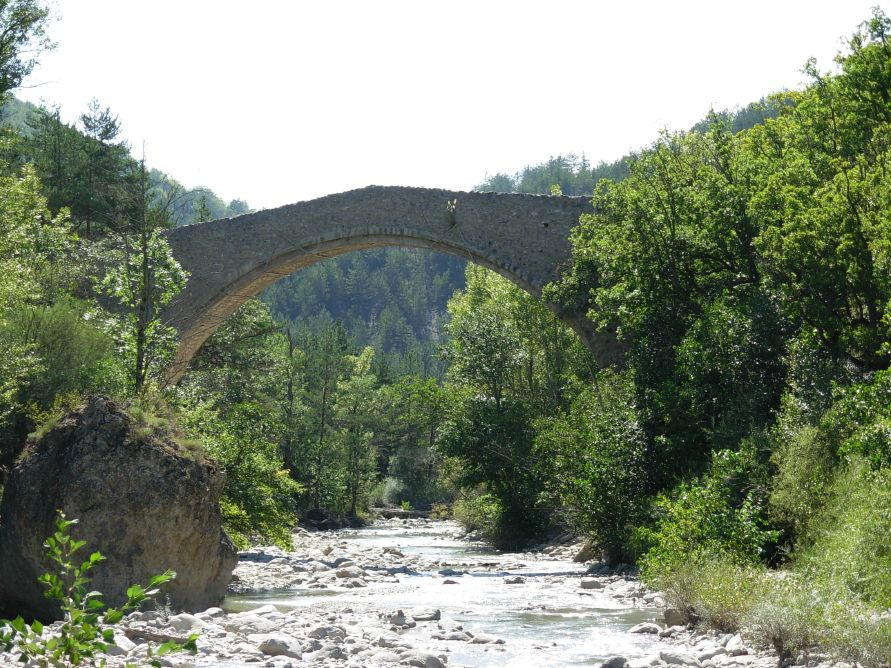
- Bridge of Queen Jeanne

- Coat of arms
- Location of Entrepierres
- Location within France Location within Provence-Alpes-Côte d'Azur
- Coordinates: 44°13′08″N 6°00′08″E
- Country: France
- Region: Provence-Alpes-Côte d'Azur
- Department: Alpes-de-Haute-Provence
- Arrondissement: Forcalquier
- Canton: Sisteron
- Intercommunality: Sisteronais Buëch

Government
  - Mayor (2026–32): Jean-Marc Alpe
- Area^{1}: 47.79 km^{2} (18.45 sq mi)
- Elevation: 600 m (2,000 ft)
- Highest elevation: 1,444 m (4,738 ft)
- Lowest elevation: 455 m (1,493 ft)
- Population (2023): 414
  - Density: 8.66/km^{2} (22.4/sq mi)
- Time zone: UTC+01:00 (CET)
  - Summer (DST): UTC+02:00 (CEST)
- INSEE/Postal code: 04075 /04200
- ^{1} French Land Register data, which excludes lakes, ponds, glaciers > 1 km^{2} (0.386 sq mi or 247 acres) and river estuaries.

Entrepierres (French pronunciation: [ɑ̃tʁəpjɛʁ]; Occitan: Entrepèiras) is a commune in the Alpes-de-Haute-Provence department in southeastern France.

== Population ==
Historical population
Year	Pop.	±% p.a.
1968	114	—
1975	136	+2.55%
1982	163	+2.62%
1990	205	+2.91%
1999	312	+4.78%
2007	382	+2.56%
2012	396	+0.72%
2017	379	−0.87%
2023	414	+1.48%
Source: INSEE

== See also ==
- Communes of the Alpes-de-Haute-Provence department
