= Valavoire =

- Commune
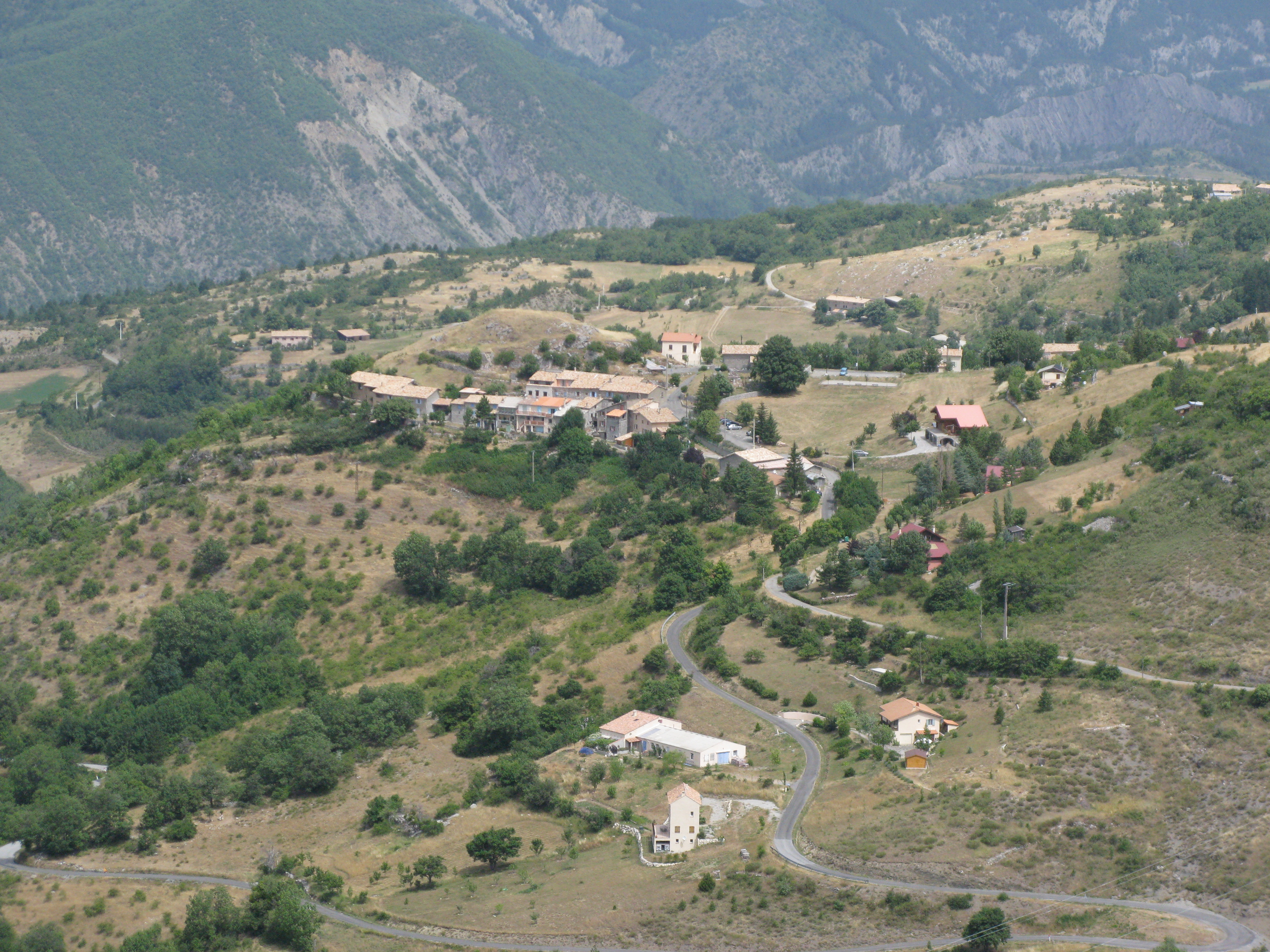
- A general view of the village of valavoire, from above

- Coat of arms
- Location of Valavoire
- Location within France Location within Provence-Alpes-Côte d'Azur
- Coordinates: 44°16′48″N 6°04′01″E
- Country: France
- Region: Provence-Alpes-Côte d'Azur
- Department: Alpes-de-Haute-Provence
- Arrondissement: Forcalquier
- Canton: Seyne

Government
  - Mayor (2026–32): Hervé Miran
- Area^{1}: 16.81 km^{2} (6.49 sq mi)
- Elevation: 1,200 m (3,900 ft)
- Highest elevation: 1,885 m (6,184 ft)
- Lowest elevation: 696 m (2,283 ft)
- Population (2023): 39
  - Density: 2.3/km^{2} (6.0/sq mi)
- Time zone: UTC+01:00 (CET)
  - Summer (DST): UTC+02:00 (CEST)
- INSEE/Postal code: 04228 /04250
- ^{1} French Land Register data, which excludes lakes, ponds, glaciers > 1 km^{2} (0.386 sq mi or 247 acres) and river estuaries.

Valavoire (French pronunciation: [valavwaʁ]; Occitan: Valavoira) is a commune in the Alpes-de-Haute-Provence department in southeastern France.

== Population ==
Historical population
Year	Pop.	±% p.a.
1968	45	—
1975	36	−3.14%
1982	45	+3.24%
1990	40	−1.46%
1999	27	−4.27%
2007	35	+3.30%
2012	39	+2.19%
2017	40	+0.51%
2023	39	−0.42%
Source: INSEE

== See also ==
- Communes of the Alpes-de-Haute-Provence department
