= Melve =

- Commune
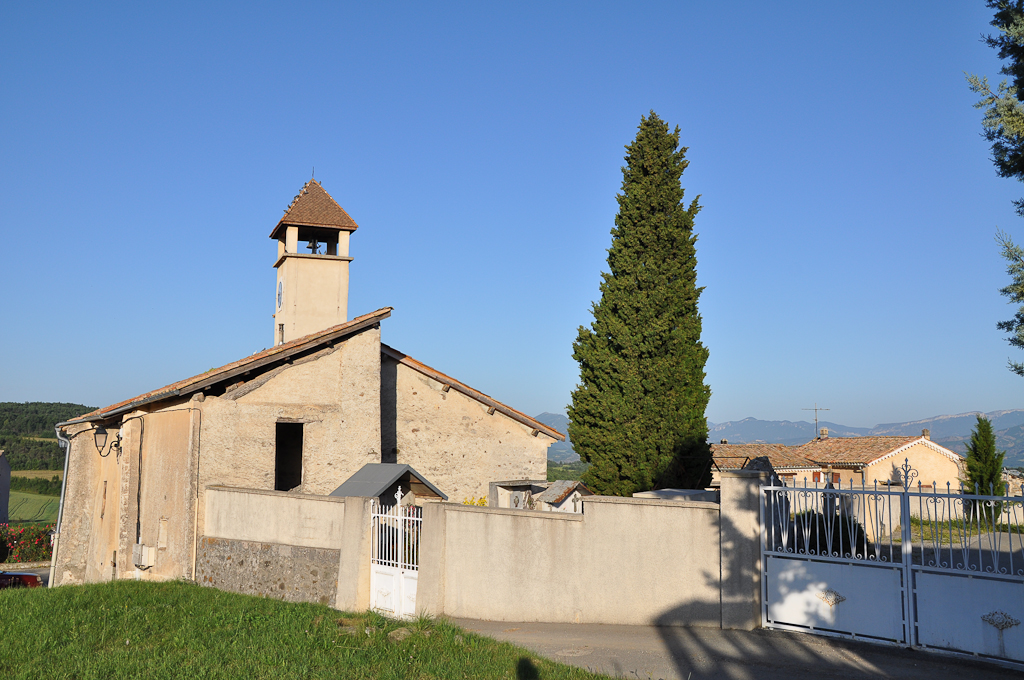
- The chapel in Melve

- Coat of arms
- Location of Melve
- Location within France Location within Provence-Alpes-Côte d'Azur
- Coordinates: 44°21′20″N 5°59′26″E
- Country: France
- Region: Provence-Alpes-Côte d'Azur
- Department: Alpes-de-Haute-Provence
- Arrondissement: Forcalquier
- Canton: Seyne

Government
  - Mayor (2026–32): Jean-Louis David
- Area^{1}: 14.11 km^{2} (5.45 sq mi)
- Elevation: 800 m (2,600 ft)
- Highest elevation: 1,478 m (4,849 ft)
- Lowest elevation: 698 m (2,290 ft)
- Population (2023): 131
  - Density: 9.28/km^{2} (24.0/sq mi)
- Time zone: UTC+01:00 (CET)
  - Summer (DST): UTC+02:00 (CEST)
- INSEE/Postal code: 04118 /04250
- ^{1} French Land Register data, which excludes lakes, ponds, glaciers > 1 km^{2} (0.386 sq mi or 247 acres) and river estuaries.

Melve (French pronunciation: [mɛlv]; Occitan: Mèuva) is a commune in the Alpes-de-Haute-Provence department in southeastern France.

== Population ==
Historical population
Year	Pop.	±% p.a.
1968	75	—
1975	80	+0.93%
1982	72	−1.49%
1990	98	+3.93%
1999	114	+1.69%
2007	107	−0.79%
2012	111	+0.74%
2017	119	+1.40%
2023	131	+1.61%
Source: INSEE

== See also ==
- Communes of the Alpes-de-Haute-Provence department
