= Piégut =

- Commune
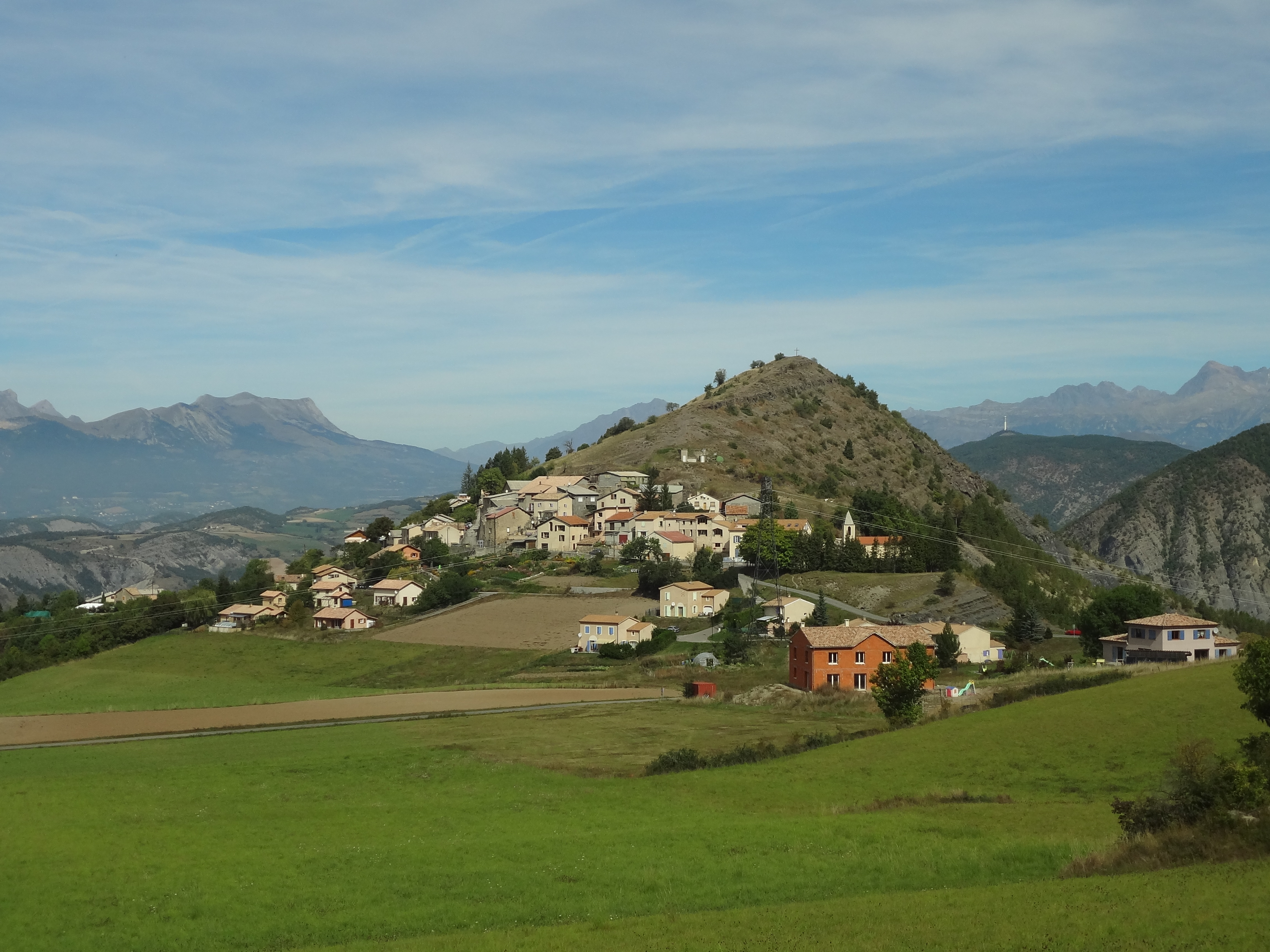
- The village of Piégut and the Colline de Saint-Colomban

- Coat of arms
- Location of Piégut
- Location within France Location within Provence-Alpes-Côte d'Azur
- Coordinates: 44°27′10″N 6°07′43″E
- Country: France
- Region: Provence-Alpes-Côte d'Azur
- Department: Alpes-de-Haute-Provence
- Arrondissement: Forcalquier
- Canton: Seyne

Government
  - Mayor (2026–32): Adèle Kuentz
- Area^{1}: 11.12 km^{2} (4.29 sq mi)
- Highest elevation: 1,560 m (5,120 ft)
- Lowest elevation: 610 m (2,000 ft)
- Population (2023): 201
  - Density: 18.1/km^{2} (46.8/sq mi)
- Time zone: UTC+01:00 (CET)
  - Summer (DST): UTC+02:00 (CEST)
- INSEE/Postal code: 04150 /05130
- ^{1} French Land Register data, which excludes lakes, ponds, glaciers > 1 km^{2} (0.386 sq mi or 247 acres) and river estuaries.

Piégut (French pronunciation: [pjeɡy]; Occitan: Piegut) is a commune in the Alpes-de-Haute-Provence department in southeastern France.

== Population ==
Historical population
Year	Pop.	±% p.a.
1968	65	—
1975	66	+0.22%
1982	72	+1.25%
1990	86	+2.25%
1999	123	+4.06%
2007	136	+1.26%
2012	149	+1.84%
2017	186	+4.54%
2023	201	+1.30%
Source: INSEE

== See also ==
- Communes of the Alpes-de-Haute-Provence department
