= Nibles =

Administrative division of Provence-Alpes-Côte d'Azur, France

- Commune
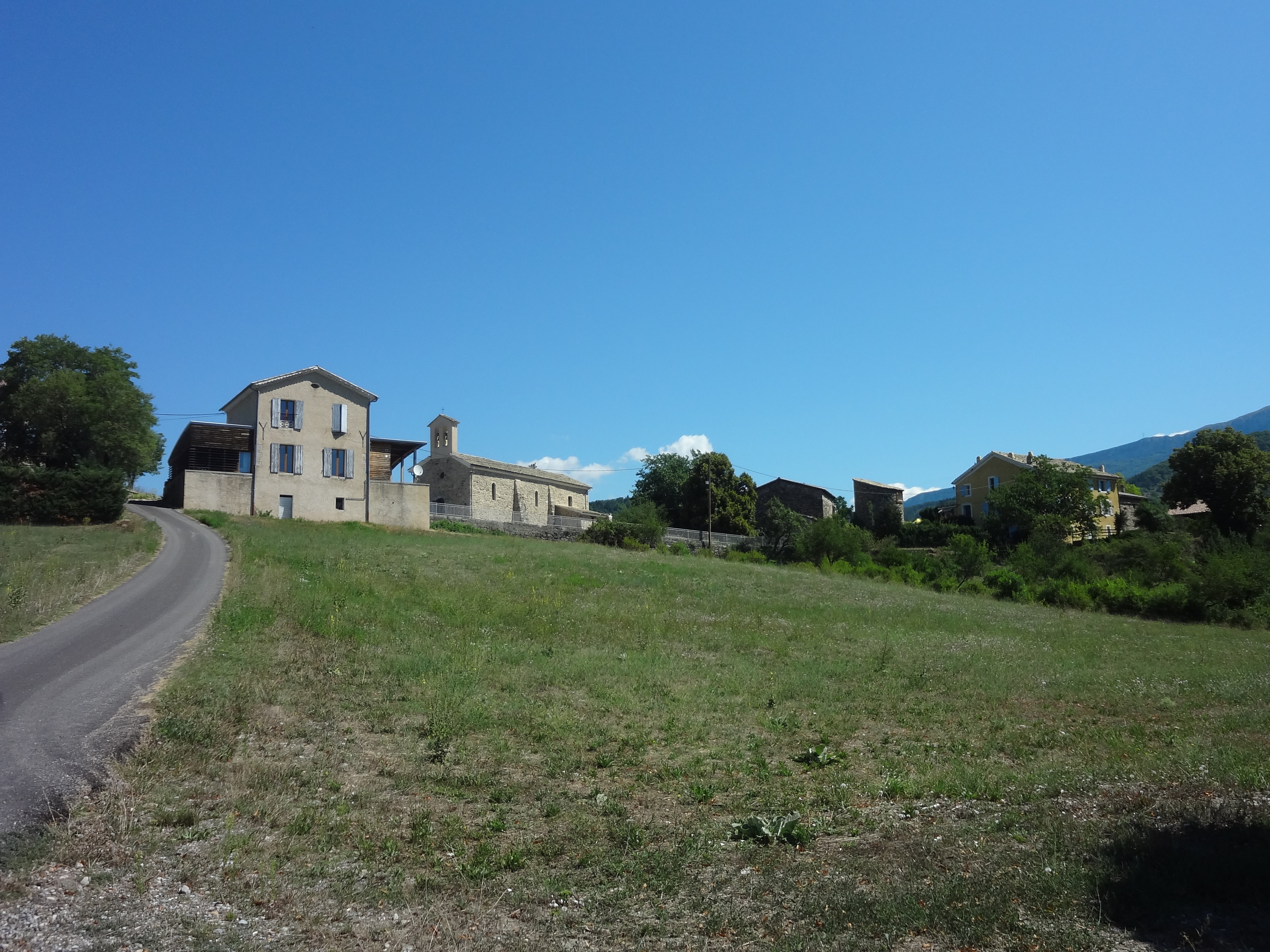
- A general view of the village of Nibles

- Coat of arms
- Location of Nibles
- Location within France Location within Provence-Alpes-Côte d'Azur
- Coordinates: 44°16′57″N 6°01′11″E
- Country: France
- Region: Provence-Alpes-Côte d'Azur
- Department: Alpes-de-Haute-Provence
- Arrondissement: Forcalquier
- Canton: Seyne
- Intercommunality: Sisteronais Buëch

Government
  - Mayor (2026–32): Anne Gautier
- Area^{1}: 12.31 km^{2} (4.75 sq mi)
- Elevation: 595 m (1,952 ft)
- Highest elevation: 1,162 m (3,812 ft)
- Lowest elevation: 538 m (1,765 ft)
- Population (2023): 54
  - Density: 4.4/km^{2} (11/sq mi)
- Time zone: UTC+01:00 (CET)
  - Summer (DST): UTC+02:00 (CEST)
- INSEE/Postal code: 04137 /04250
- ^{1} French Land Register data, which excludes lakes, ponds, glaciers > 1 km^{2} (0.386 sq mi or 247 acres) and river estuaries.

Nibles (French pronunciation: [nibl]) is a commune in the Alpes-de-Haute-Provence department in southeastern France.

== Population ==
Historical population
Year	Pop.	±% p.a.
1968	35	—
1975	33	−0.84%
1982	43	+3.85%
1990	51	+2.16%
1999	42	−2.13%
2007	46	+1.14%
2012	44	−0.89%
2017	42	−0.93%
2023	54	+4.28%
Source: INSEE

== See also ==
- Communes of the Alpes-de-Haute-Provence department
