= Valernes =

- Commune
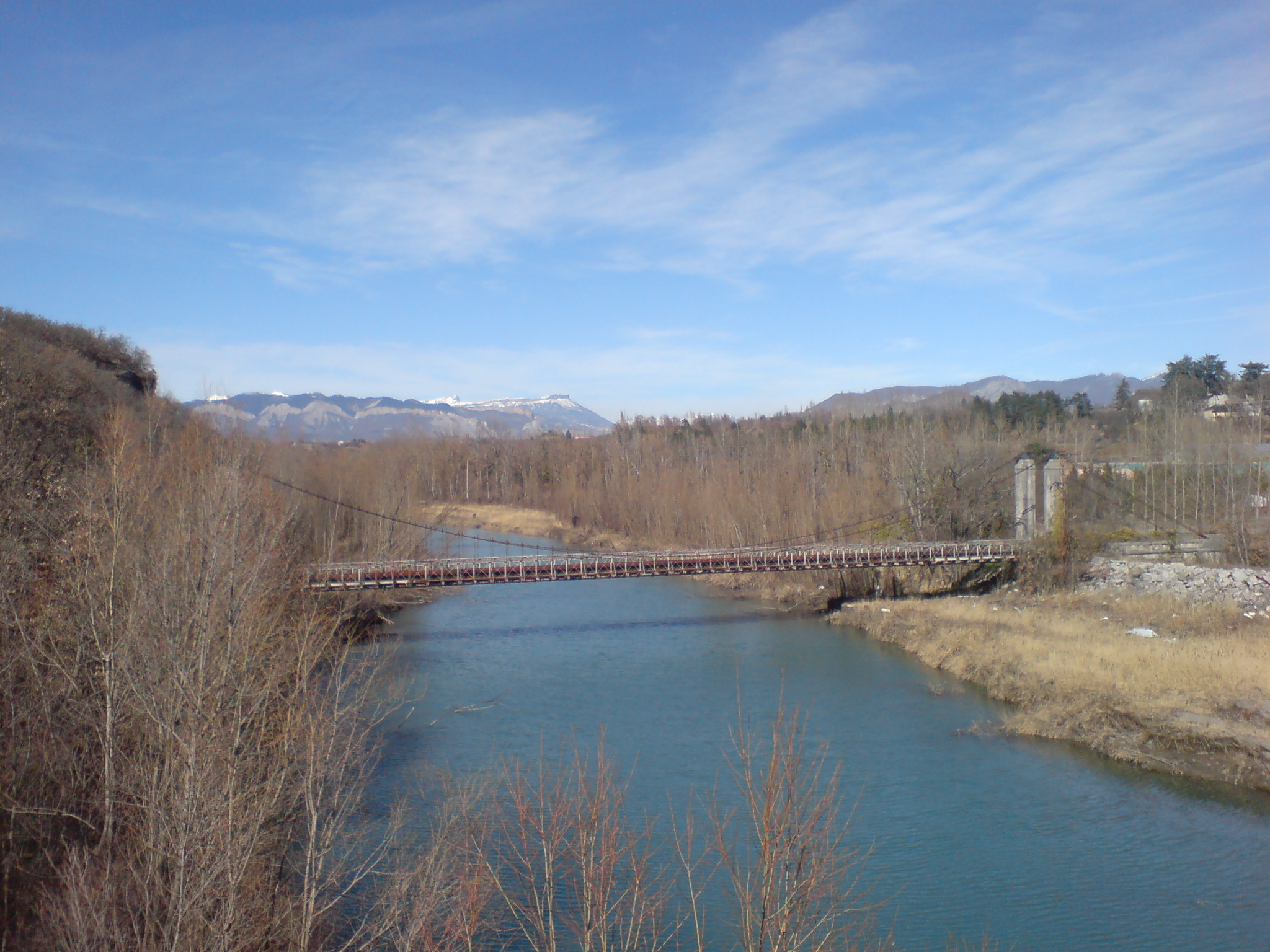
- The Fombeton bridge, in Valernes

- Coat of arms
- Location of Valernes
- Location within France Location within Provence-Alpes-Côte d'Azur
- Coordinates: 44°15′47″N 5°57′32″E
- Country: France
- Region: Provence-Alpes-Côte d'Azur
- Department: Alpes-de-Haute-Provence
- Arrondissement: Forcalquier
- Canton: Seyne

Government
  - Mayor (2026–32): Jean-Christophe Pik
- Area^{1}: 28.49 km^{2} (11.00 sq mi)
- Elevation: 625 m (2,051 ft)
- Highest elevation: 1,357 m (4,452 ft)
- Lowest elevation: 460 m (1,510 ft)
- Population (2023): 245
  - Density: 8.60/km^{2} (22.3/sq mi)
- Time zone: UTC+01:00 (CET)
  - Summer (DST): UTC+02:00 (CEST)
- INSEE/Postal code: 04231 /04200
- ^{1} French Land Register data, which excludes lakes, ponds, glaciers > 1 km^{2} (0.386 sq mi or 247 acres) and river estuaries.

Valernes (French pronunciation: [valɛʁn]; Occitan: Valèrna) is a commune in the Alpes-de-Haute-Provence department in southeastern France.

== Population ==
Historical population
Year	Pop.	±% p.a.
1968	174	—
1975	142	−2.86%
1982	178	+3.28%
1990	222	+2.80%
1999	231	+0.44%
2007	240	+0.48%
2012	250	+0.82%
2017	250	+0.00%
2023	245	−0.34%
Source: INSEE

== See also ==
- Communes of the Alpes-de-Haute-Provence department
