= Sigoyer, Alpes-de-Haute-Provence =

Sigoyer
- Commune
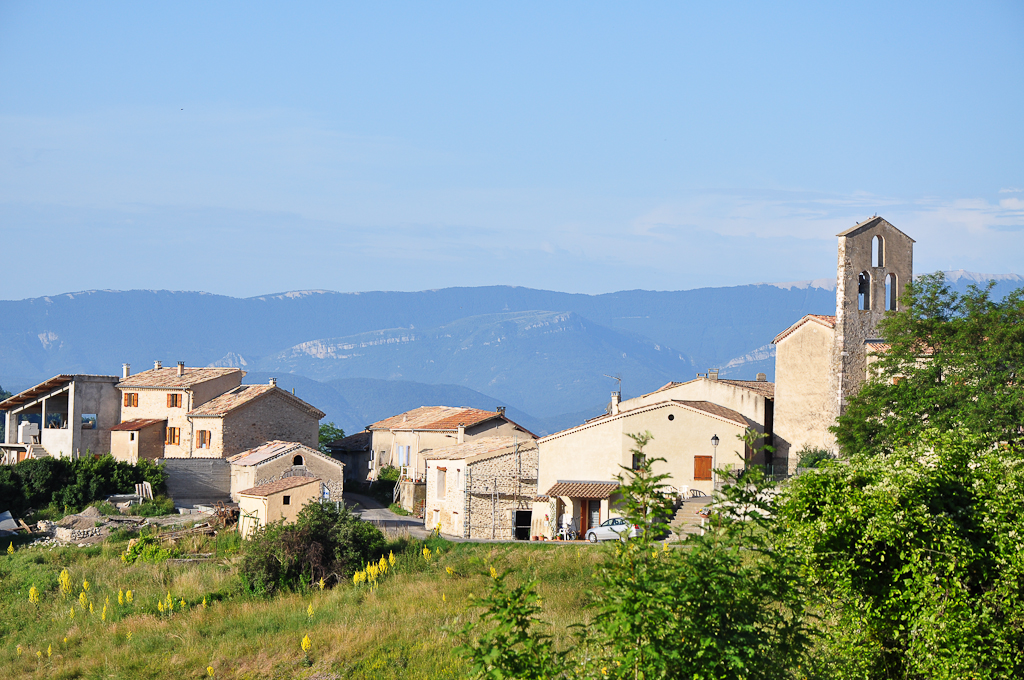
- The church and surrounding buildings in Sigoyer

- Coat of arms
- Location of Sigoyer
- Location within France Location within Provence-Alpes-Côte d'Azur
- Coordinates: 44°19′12″N 5°57′32″E
- Country: France
- Region: Provence-Alpes-Côte d'Azur
- Department: Alpes-de-Haute-Provence
- Arrondissement: Forcalquier
- Canton: Seyne

Government
  - Mayor (2026–32): Michel Hernandez
- Area^{1}: 15.3 km^{2} (5.9 sq mi)
- Elevation: 832 m (2,730 ft)
- Highest elevation: 945 m (3,100 ft)
- Lowest elevation: 482 m (1,581 ft)
- Population (2023): 101
  - Density: 6.60/km^{2} (17.1/sq mi)
- Time zone: UTC+01:00 (CET)
  - Summer (DST): UTC+02:00 (CEST)
- INSEE/Postal code: 04207 /04200
- ^{1} French Land Register data, which excludes lakes, ponds, glaciers > 1 km^{2} (0.386 sq mi or 247 acres) and river estuaries.

Sigoyer (French pronunciation: [sigɔje]; Occitan: Sigoier) is a commune in the Alpes-de-Haute-Provence department in southeastern France.

== Population ==
Historical population
Year	Pop.	±% p.a.
1968	70	—
1975	72	+0.40%
1982	83	+2.05%
1990	88	+0.73%
1999	75	−1.76%
2007	83	+1.27%
2012	101	+4.00%
2017	107	+1.16%
2023	101	−0.96%
Source: INSEE

== See also ==
- Communes of the Alpes-de-Haute-Provence department
