= Le Caire =

- Commune
- Coat of arms
- Location of Le Caire
- Location within France Location within Provence-Alpes-Côte d'Azur
- Coordinates: 44°22′13″N 6°03′38″E
- Country: France
- Region: Provence-Alpes-Côte d'Azur
- Department: Alpes-de-Haute-Provence
- Arrondissement: Forcalquier
- Canton: Seyne

Government
  - Mayor (2026–32): Jean-Michel Magnan
- Area^{1}: 17.63 km^{2} (6.81 sq mi)
- Elevation: 720 m (2,360 ft)
- Highest elevation: 1,559 m (5,115 ft)
- Lowest elevation: 743 m (2,438 ft)
- Population (2023): 80
  - Density: 4.5/km^{2} (12/sq mi)
- Time zone: UTC+01:00 (CET)
  - Summer (DST): UTC+02:00 (CEST)
- INSEE/Postal code: 04037 /04250
- ^{1} French Land Register data, which excludes lakes, ponds, glaciers > 1 km^{2} (0.386 sq mi or 247 acres) and river estuaries.

Le Caire (French pronunciation: [lə kɛʁ]; Occitan: Lo Caire) is a commune in the Alpes-de-Haute-Provence department in southeastern France, about 30 km north of Sisteron. The town's principal economic activity is aboriculture.

== Population ==
Historical population
Year	Pop.	±% p.a.
1968	68	—
1975	69	+0.21%
1982	72	+0.61%
1990	85	+2.10%
1999	76	−1.24%
2007	69	−1.20%
2012	64	−1.49%
2017	71	+2.10%
2023	80	+2.01%
Source: INSEE

Its inhabitants are called Cairois in French.

== Tourism ==
The town's via ferrata, named Via ferrata de la grande fistoire, was created in 1996. In 2006, the via had been climbed by 40,000 people. It is also the nearest via ferrata to Marseille.

The town's old lime plaster mill was declared an historic monument in 1996.

== Geography ==
The town is bordered by several neighboring villages and municipalities within the same department. Its center is situated at an elevation of approximately 786 meters above sea level, while the terrain ranges from 743 meters at its lowest point to 1,559 meters at its highest, The municipality covers an area of 17.63 km² and is primarily characterized by mountainous and forested terrain, with forests accounting for approximately 57.8% of the total area, including semi-natural areas. Agricultural land is less dense due to the rocky and mountainous nature of the landscape, concentrated mainly in some valleys and lower areas.

== See also ==
- Communes of the Alpes-de-Haute-Provence department
