= Clamensane =

- Commune
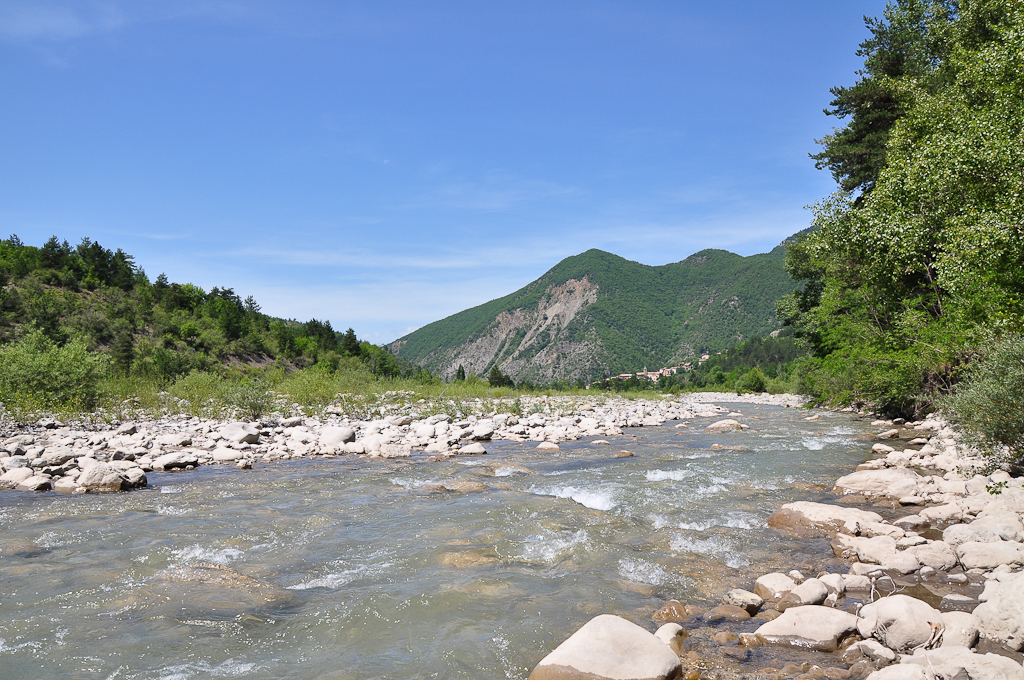
- The Sasse

- Coat of arms
- Location of Clamensane
- Location within France Location within Provence-Alpes-Côte d'Azur
- Coordinates: 44°19′23″N 6°04′08″E
- Country: France
- Region: Provence-Alpes-Côte d'Azur
- Department: Alpes-de-Haute-Provence
- Arrondissement: Forcalquier
- Canton: Seyne

Government
  - Mayor (2026–32): Charlotte Plazanet
- Area^{1}: 23.73 km^{2} (9.16 sq mi)
- Elevation: 700 m (2,300 ft)
- Highest elevation: 1,658 m (5,440 ft)
- Lowest elevation: 630 m (2,070 ft)
- Population (2023): 183
  - Density: 7.71/km^{2} (20.0/sq mi)
- Time zone: UTC+01:00 (CET)
  - Summer (DST): UTC+02:00 (CEST)
- INSEE/Postal code: 04057 /04250
- ^{1} French Land Register data, which excludes lakes, ponds, glaciers > 1 km^{2} (0.386 sq mi or 247 acres) and river estuaries.

Clamensane (French pronunciation: [klamɑ̃san]; Occitan: Clamençana) is a commune in the Alpes-de-Haute-Provence department in southeastern France.

== Geography ==
The village is located 700 m above sea level, at the confluence of Sasse and Vermeil rivers.

== Population ==
Historical population
Year	Pop.	±% p.a.
1968	125	—
1975	106	−2.33%
1982	110	+0.53%
1990	115	+0.56%
1999	131	+1.46%
2007	155	+2.13%
2012	181	+3.15%
2017	172	−1.01%
2023	183	+1.04%
Source: INSEE

== See also ==
- Communes of the Alpes-de-Haute-Provence department
