= Venterol, Alpes-de-Haute-Provence =

Venterol
- Commune
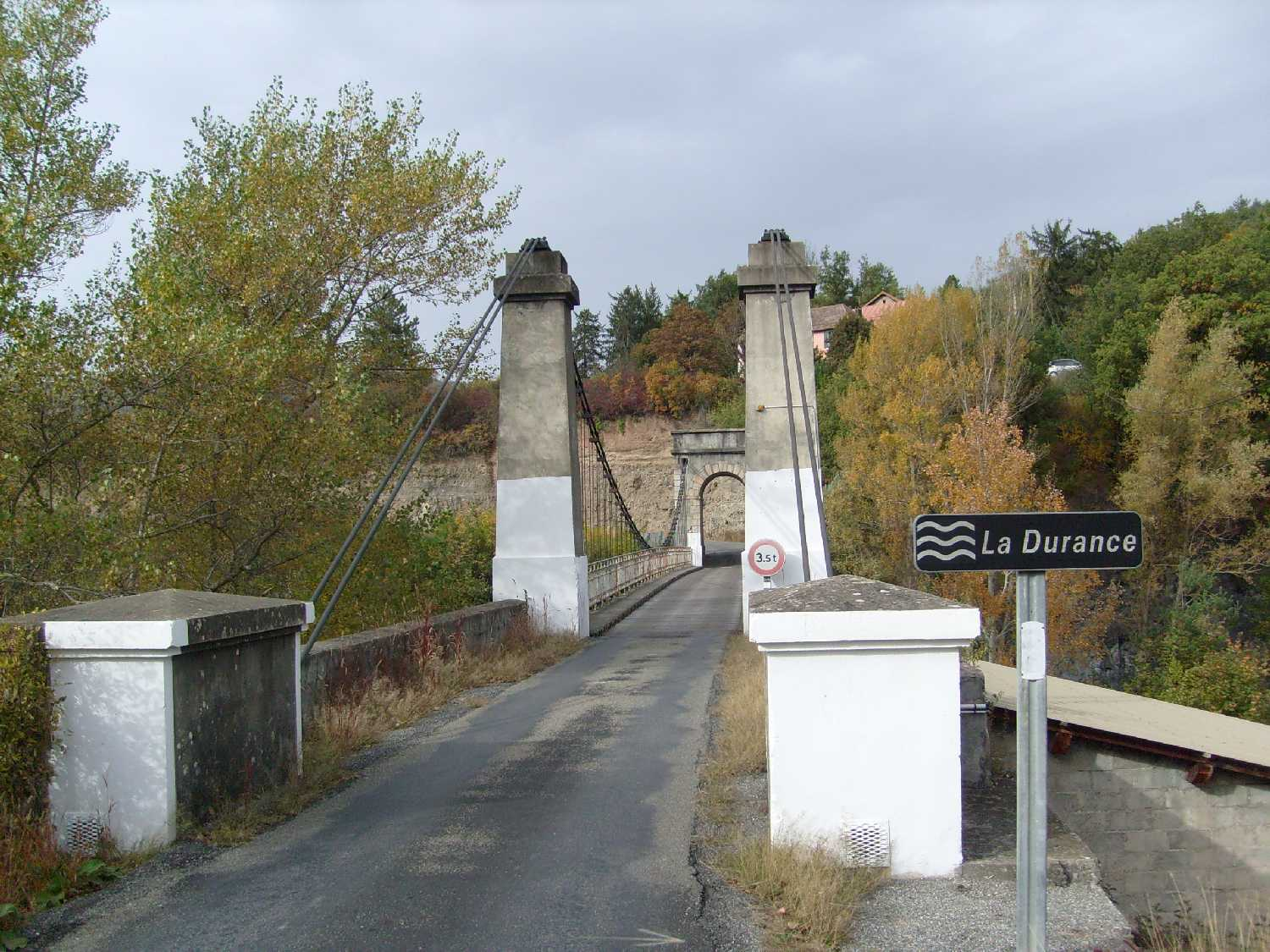
- Bridge over the Durance

- Coat of arms
- Location of Venterol
- Location within France Location within Provence-Alpes-Côte d'Azur
- Coordinates: 44°26′45″N 6°05′59″E
- Country: France
- Region: Provence-Alpes-Côte d'Azur
- Department: Alpes-de-Haute-Provence
- Arrondissement: Forcalquier
- Canton: Seyne

Government
  - Mayor (2026–32): Michel Philip
- Area^{1}: 22.75 km^{2} (8.78 sq mi)
- Elevation: 1,000 m (3,300 ft)
- Highest elevation: 1,562 m (5,125 ft)
- Lowest elevation: 595 m (1,952 ft)
- Population (2023): 236
  - Density: 10.4/km^{2} (26.9/sq mi)
- Time zone: UTC+01:00 (CET)
  - Summer (DST): UTC+02:00 (CEST)
- INSEE/Postal code: 04234 /05130
- ^{1} French Land Register data, which excludes lakes, ponds, glaciers > 1 km^{2} (0.386 sq mi or 247 acres) and river estuaries.

Venterol (French pronunciation: [vɛ̃t(ə)ʁɔl]) is a commune in the Alpes-de-Haute-Provence department in southeastern France.

== Population ==
Historical population
Year	Pop.	±% p.a.
1968	134	—
1975	131	−0.32%
1982	115	−1.84%
1990	142	+2.67%
1999	197	+3.70%
2007	208	+0.68%
2012	248	+3.58%
2017	241	−0.57%
2023	236	−0.35%
Source: INSEE

== See also ==
- Communes of the Alpes-de-Haute-Provence department
