= Bellaffaire =

- Commune
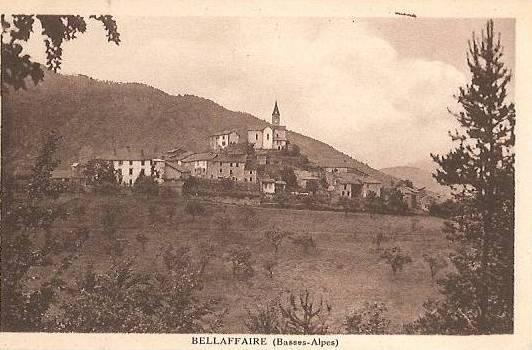
- The village in the 1920s

- Coat of arms
- Location of Bellaffaire
- Location within France Location within Provence-Alpes-Côte d'Azur
- Coordinates: 44°25′13″N 6°10′39″E
- Country: France
- Region: Provence-Alpes-Côte d'Azur
- Department: Alpes-de-Haute-Provence
- Arrondissement: Forcalquier
- Canton: Seyne

Government
  - Mayor (2026–32): Bernard Caveing
- Area^{1}: 13.12 km^{2} (5.07 sq mi)
- Elevation: 845 m (2,772 ft)
- Highest elevation: 1,597 m (5,240 ft)
- Lowest elevation: 717 m (2,352 ft)
- Population (2023): 159
  - Density: 12.1/km^{2} (31.4/sq mi)
- Time zone: UTC+01:00 (CET)
  - Summer (DST): UTC+02:00 (CEST)
- INSEE/Postal code: 04026 /04250
- ^{1} French Land Register data, which excludes lakes, ponds, glaciers > 1 km^{2} (0.386 sq mi or 247 acres) and river estuaries.

Bellaffaire (French pronunciation: [bɛlafɛʁ]; Occitan: Belafaire) is a commune in the Alpes-de-Haute-Provence department in southeastern France.

== Population ==
Historical population
Year	Pop.	±% p.a.
1968	165	—
1975	135	−2.83%
1982	116	−2.14%
1990	123	+0.74%
1999	142	+1.61%
2007	138	−0.36%
2012	152	+1.95%
2017	144	−1.08%
2023	159	+1.67%
Source: INSEE

== See also ==
- Communes of the Alpes-de-Haute-Provence department
