= Thèze, Alpes-de-Haute-Provence =

Thèze
- Commune
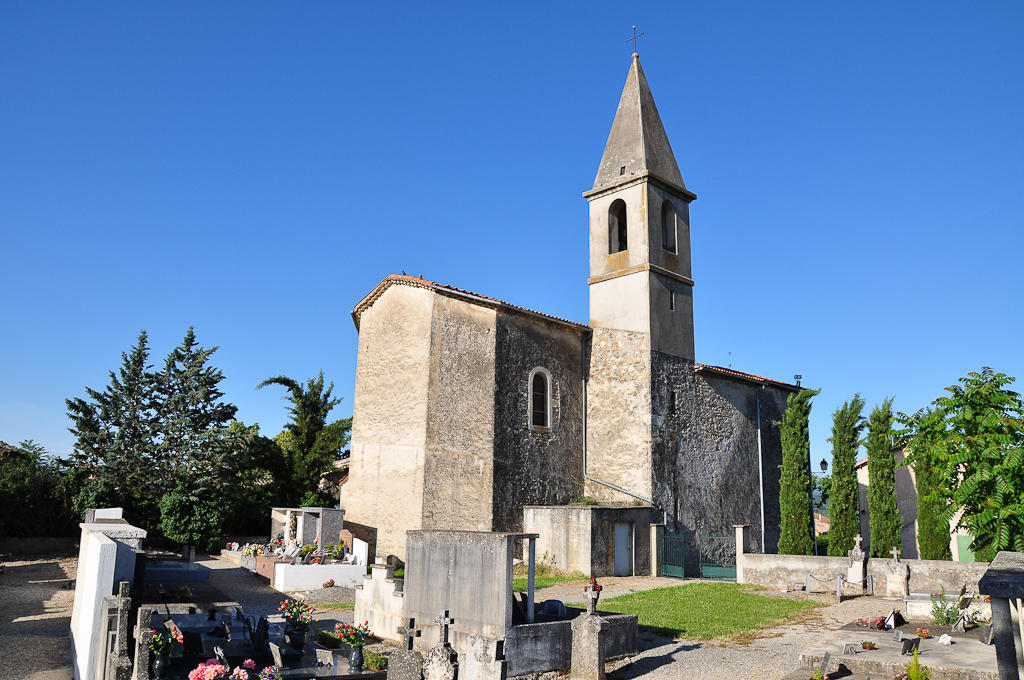
- Thèze, church and cemetery

- Coat of arms
- Location of Thèze
- Location within France Location within Provence-Alpes-Côte d'Azur
- Coordinates: 44°19′10″N 5°55′19″E
- Country: France
- Region: Provence-Alpes-Côte d'Azur
- Department: Alpes-de-Haute-Provence
- Arrondissement: Forcalquier
- Canton: Seyne

Government
  - Mayor (2026–32): Gérôme Garcin
- Area^{1}: 11.17 km^{2} (4.31 sq mi)
- Highest elevation: 728 m (2,388 ft)
- Lowest elevation: 492 m (1,614 ft)
- Population (2023): 268
  - Density: 24.0/km^{2} (62.1/sq mi)
- Time zone: UTC+01:00 (CET)
  - Summer (DST): UTC+02:00 (CEST)
- INSEE/Postal code: 04216 /04200
- ^{1} French Land Register data, which excludes lakes, ponds, glaciers > 1 km^{2} (0.386 sq mi or 247 acres) and river estuaries.

Thèze (French pronunciation: [tɛz]; Occitan: Tesa) is a commune in the Alpes-de-Haute-Provence department in southeastern France.

== Population ==
Historical population
Year	Pop.	±% p.a.
1968	128	—
1975	105	−2.79%
1982	119	+1.80%
1990	130	+1.11%
1999	144	+1.14%
2007	202	+4.32%
2012	222	+1.91%
2017	236	+1.23%
2023	268	+2.14%
Source: INSEE

== See also ==
- Communes of the Alpes-de-Haute-Provence department
