= Faucon-du-Caire =

- Commune
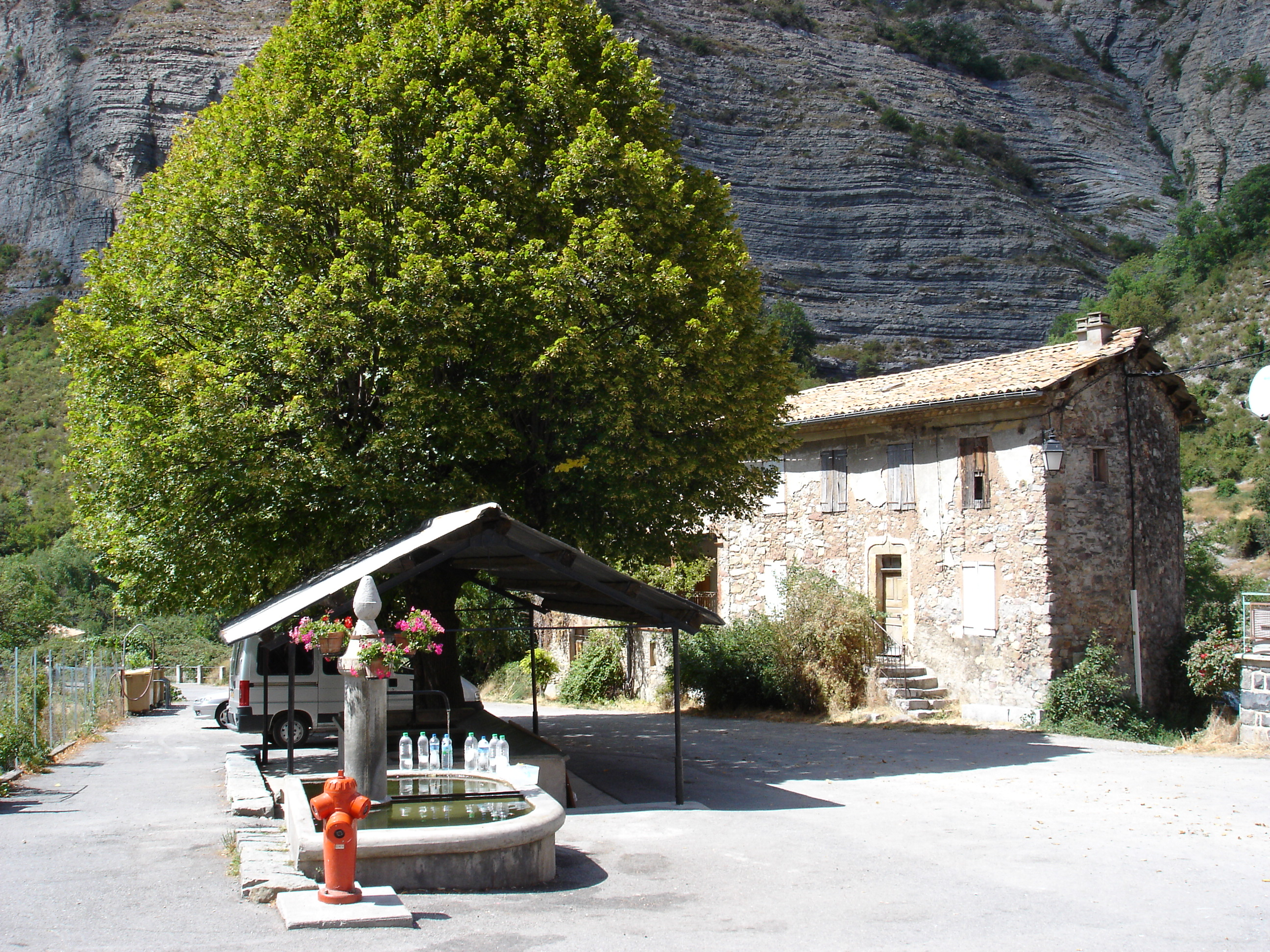
- A view within the village of Faucon-du-Caire, in 2007

- Coat of arms
- Location of Faucon-du-Caire
- Location within France Location within Provence-Alpes-Côte d'Azur
- Coordinates: 44°23′53″N 6°05′31″E
- Country: France
- Region: Provence-Alpes-Côte d'Azur
- Department: Alpes-de-Haute-Provence
- Arrondissement: Forcalquier
- Canton: Seyne

Government
  - Mayor (2026–32): Robert Zunino
- Area^{1}: 19.93 km^{2} (7.70 sq mi)
- Elevation: 910 m (2,990 ft)
- Highest elevation: 1,714 m (5,623 ft)
- Lowest elevation: 846 m (2,776 ft)
- Population (2023): 60
  - Density: 3.0/km^{2} (7.8/sq mi)
- Time zone: UTC+01:00 (CET)
  - Summer (DST): UTC+02:00 (CEST)
- INSEE/Postal code: 04085 /04250
- ^{1} French Land Register data, which excludes lakes, ponds, glaciers > 1 km^{2} (0.386 sq mi or 247 acres) and river estuaries.

Faucon-du-Caire (French pronunciation: [fokɔ̃ dy kɛʁ]; Occitan: Faucon dau Caire) is a commune in the Alpes-de-Haute-Provence department in southeastern France.

== Population ==
Historical population
Year	Pop.	±% p.a.
1968	38	—
1975	34	−1.58%
1982	35	+0.41%
1990	49	+4.30%
1999	35	−3.67%
2007	52	+5.07%
2012	57	+1.85%
2017	53	−1.44%
2023	60	+2.09%
Source: INSEE

== See also ==
- Communes of the Alpes-de-Haute-Provence department
