= Gigors =

- Coat of arms
- Location of Gigors
- Location within France Location within Provence-Alpes-Côte d'Azur
- Coordinates: 44°25′12″N 6°09′37″E
- Country: France
- Region: Provence-Alpes-Côte d'Azur
- Department: Alpes-de-Haute-Provence
- Arrondissement: Forcalquier
- Canton: Seyne

Government
  - Mayor (2026–32): Daniel Terrier
- Area^{1}: 13.69 km^{2} (5.29 sq mi)
- Elevation: 875 m (2,871 ft)
- Highest elevation: 1,586 m (5,203 ft)
- Lowest elevation: 806 m (2,644 ft)
- Population (2023): 58
  - Density: 4.2/km^{2} (11/sq mi)
- Time zone: UTC+01:00 (CET)
  - Summer (DST): UTC+02:00 (CEST)
- INSEE/Postal code: 04093 /04250
- ^{1} French Land Register data, which excludes lakes, ponds, glaciers > 1 km^{2} (0.386 sq mi or 247 acres) and river estuaries.

Gigors (French pronunciation: [ʒigɔʁ]) is a commune in the Alpes-de-Haute-Provence department in southeastern France.

== Population ==
Historical population
Year	Pop.	±% p.a.
1968	29	—
1975	34	+2.30%
1982	37	+1.22%
1990	39	+0.66%
1999	41	+0.56%
2007	56	+3.97%
2012	60	+1.39%
2017	60	+0.00%
2023	58	−0.56%
Source: INSEE

== See also ==
- Communes of the Alpes-de-Haute-Provence department
