= Châteaufort, Alpes-de-Haute-Provence =

Châteaufort
- Commune
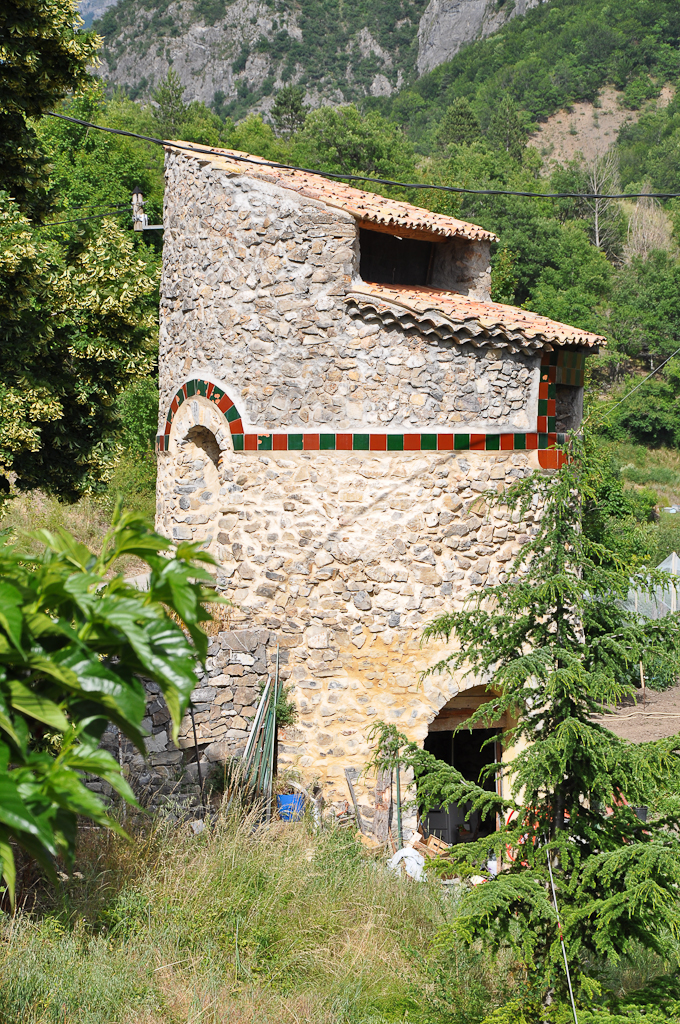
- Dovecote of the chateau

- Coat of arms
- Location of Châteaufort
- Location within France Location within Provence-Alpes-Côte d'Azur
- Coordinates: 44°16′29″N 6°01′01″E
- Country: France
- Region: Provence-Alpes-Côte d'Azur
- Department: Alpes-de-Haute-Provence
- Arrondissement: Forcalquier
- Canton: Seyne

Government
  - Mayor (2026–32): Geneviève Demontis
- Area^{1}: 13.73 km^{2} (5.30 sq mi)
- Elevation: 610 m (2,000 ft)
- Highest elevation: 1,280 m (4,200 ft)
- Lowest elevation: 541 m (1,775 ft)
- Population (2023): 29
  - Density: 2.1/km^{2} (5.5/sq mi)
- Time zone: UTC+01:00 (CET)
  - Summer (DST): UTC+02:00 (CEST)
- INSEE/Postal code: 04050 /04250
- ^{1} French Land Register data, which excludes lakes, ponds, glaciers > 1 km^{2} (0.386 sq mi or 247 acres) and river estuaries.

Châteaufort (French pronunciation: [ʃɑtofɔʁ]; Occitan: Chastèufòrt) is a commune in the Alpes-de-Haute-Provence department in southeastern France.

== Population ==
Historical population
Year	Pop.	±% p.a.
1968	29	—
1975	26	−1.55%
1982	25	−0.56%
1990	30	+2.31%
1999	28	−0.76%
2007	27	−0.45%
2012	25	−1.53%
2017	28	+2.29%
2023	29	+0.59%
Source: INSEE

== See also ==
- Communes of the Alpes-de-Haute-Provence department
