= Canton of Seyne =

Coordinates: 44°21′05″N 6°21′25″E

Seyne
- Canton
- Interactive map of Seyne
- Country: France
- Region: Provence-Alpes-Côte d'Azur
- Department: Alpes-de-Haute-Provence
- No. of communes: {{{nbcomm}}}
- Area: 1,078.10 km^{2} (416.26 sq mi)
- Population (2023): 8,477
  - Density: 7.863/km^{2} (20.36/sq mi)
- INSEE code: 04 13

The canton of Seyne is an administrative division in southeastern France. At the French canton reorganisation which came into effect in March 2015, the canton was expanded from 8 to 34 communes:

1. Archail
2. Auzet
3. Barles
4. Bayons
5. Beaujeu
6. Bellaffaire
7. Le Brusquet
8. Le Caire
9. Châteaufort
10. Clamensane
11. Claret
12. Curbans
13. Draix
14. Faucon-du-Caire
15. Gigors
16. La Javie
17. Melve
18. Montclar
19. La Motte-du-Caire
20. Nibles
21. Piégut
22. Prads-Haute-Bléone
23. Saint-Martin-lès-Seyne
24. Selonnet
25. Seyne
26. Sigoyer
27. Thèze
28. Turriers
29. Valavoire
30. Valernes
31. Vaumeilh
32. Venterol
33. Verdaches
34. Le Vernet

== Demographics ==
Historical population
Year	Pop.	±% p.a.
2013	8,349	—
2018	8,403	+0.13%
Source: INSEE

== See also ==
- Cantons of the Alpes-de-Haute-Provence department
- Communes of France
