= Canton of Annot =

Coordinates: 43°57′57″N 6°40′10″E

Annot
- Former canton
- Interactive map of Annot
- Country: France
- Region: Provence-Alpes-Côte d'Azur
- Department: Alpes-de-Haute-Provence
- No. of communes: {{{nbcomm}}}
- Disbanded: 2015
- Area: 205.00 km^{2} (79.15 sq mi)
- Population (2012): 1,872
  - Density: 9.132/km^{2} (23.65/sq mi)

The canton of Annot is a former administrative division in southeastern France. It was disbanded following the French canton reorganisation which came into effect in March 2015. It consisted of 7 communes, which joined the canton of Castellane in 2015. It had 1,872 inhabitants (2012).

The canton comprised the following communes:

- Annot
- Braux
- Le Fugeret
- Méailles
- Saint-Benoît
- Ubraye
- Vergons

== Demographics ==
Historical population Canton of Annot
Year	1962	1968	1975	1982	1990	1999
Pop.	1,428	1,604	1,473	1,632	1,715	1,666
±%	—	+12.3%	−8.2%	+10.8%	+5.1%	−2.9%
From the year 1962 on: No double counting – residents of multiple communes (e.g. students and military personnel) are counted only once. Source: INSEE

== See also ==
- Cantons of the Alpes-de-Haute-Provence department
