= Arrondissement of Castellane =

Coordinates: 43.85°N 6.52°E

Castellane
- Arrondissement
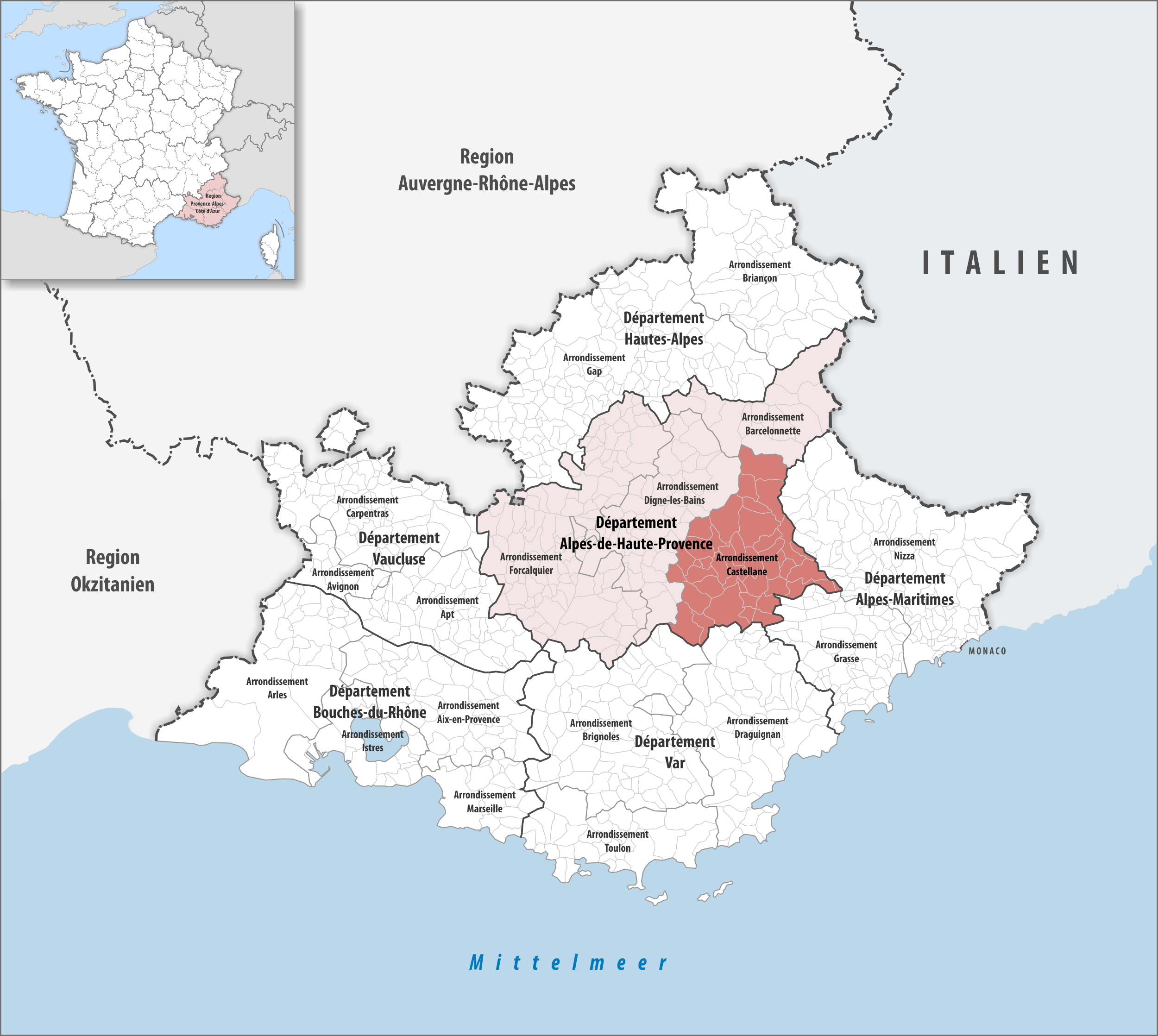
- Location within the region Provence-Alpes-Côte d'Azur
- Country: France
- Region: Provence-Alpes-Côte d'Azur
- Department: Alpes-de-Haute-Provence
- No. of communes: {{{nbcomm}}}
- Area: 1,718.1 km^{2} (663.4 sq mi)
- Population (2023): 11,495
  - Density: 6.6905/km^{2} (17.328/sq mi)
- INSEE code: 042

The arrondissement of Castellane is an arrondissement of France in the Alpes-de-Haute-Provence department in the Provence-Alpes-Côte d'Azur region. It has 41 communes. Its population is 11,388 (2021), and its area is 1,718.1 km^{2} (663.4 sq mi).

== Composition ==
The communes of the arrondissement of Castellane, and their INSEE codes, are:

1. Allons (04005)
2. Allos (04006)
3. Angles (04007)
4. Annot (04008)
5. Barrême (04022)
6. Beauvezer (04025)
7. Blieux (04030)
8. Braux (04032)
9. Castellane (04039)
10. Castellet-lès-Sausses (04042)
11. Chaudon-Norante (04055)
12. Clumanc (04059)
13. Colmars (04061)
14. Demandolx (04069)
15. Entrevaux (04076)
16. Le Fugeret (04090)
17. La Garde (04092)
18. Lambruisse (04099)
19. Méailles (04115)
20. Moriez (04133)
21. La Mure-Argens (04136)
22. La Palud-sur-Verdon (04144)
23. Peyroules (04148)
24. La Rochette (04170)
25. Rougon (04171)
26. Saint-André-les-Alpes (04173)
27. Saint-Benoît (04174)
28. Saint-Jacques (04180)
29. Saint-Julien-du-Verdon (04183)
30. Saint-Lions (04187)
31. Saint-Pierre (04194)
32. Sausses (04202)
33. Senez (04204)
34. Soleilhas (04210)
35. Tartonne (04214)
36. Thorame-Basse (04218)
37. Thorame-Haute (04219)
38. Ubraye (04224)
39. Val-de-Chalvagne (04043)
40. Vergons (04236)
41. Villars-Colmars (04240)

== History ==
The arrondissement of Castellane was created in 1800, it was disbanded in 1926 and it was restored in 1942. At the January 2017 reorganization of the arrondissements of Alpes-de-Haute-Provence, it gained nine communes from the arrondissement of Digne-les-Bains.

As a result of the reorganisation of the cantons of France which came into effect in 2015, the borders of the cantons are no longer related to the borders of the arrondissements. The cantons of the arrondissement of Castellane were, as of January 2015:

1. Allos-Colmars
2. Annot
3. Castellane
4. Entrevaux
5. Saint-André-les-Alpes
