= Canton of Entrevaux =

Coordinates: 43°56′58″N 6°48′39″E

Entrevaux
- Former canton
- Interactive map of Entrevaux
- Country: France
- Region: Provence-Alpes-Côte d'Azur
- Department: Alpes-de-Haute-Provence
- No. of communes: {{{nbcomm}}}
- Disbanded: 2015
- Area: 185.95 km^{2} (71.80 sq mi)
- Population (2012): 1,418
  - Density: 7.626/km^{2} (19.75/sq mi)

The canton of Entrevaux is a former administrative division in southeastern France. It was disbanded following the French canton reorganisation which came into effect in March 2015. It consisted of 6 communes, which joined the canton of Castellane in 2015. It had 1,418 inhabitants (2012).

The canton comprised the following communes:

- Castellet-lès-Sausses
- Entrevaux
- La Rochette
- Saint-Pierre
- Sausses
- Val-de-Chalvagne

== Demographics ==
Historical population Canton of Entrevaux
Year	1962	1968	1975	1982	1990	1999
Pop.	815	1,057	978	1,050	1,126	1,087
±%	—	+29.7%	−7.5%	+7.4%	+7.2%	−3.5%
From the year 1962 on: No double counting – residents of multiple communes (e.g. students and military personnel) are counted only once. Source: INSEE

== See also ==
- Cantons of the Alpes-de-Haute-Provence department
