= Canton of Saint-André-les-Alpes =

Coordinates: 43°58′08″N 6°30′30″E

Saint-André-les-Alpes
- Former canton
- Interactive map of Saint-André-les-Alpes
- Country: France
- Region: Provence-Alpes-Côte d'Azur
- Department: Alpes-de-Haute-Provence
- No. of communes: {{{nbcomm}}}
- Disbanded: 2015
- Area: 192.69 km^{2} (74.40 sq mi)
- Population (2012): 1,778
  - Density: 9.227/km^{2} (23.90/sq mi)

The canton of Saint-André-les-Alpes is a former administrative division in southeastern France. It was disbanded following the French canton reorganisation which came into effect in March 2015. It consisted of 6 communes, which joined the canton of Castellane in 2015. It had 1,778 inhabitants (2012).

The canton comprised the following communes:

- Allons
- Angles
- Lambruisse
- Moriez
- La Mure-Argens
- Saint-André-les-Alpes

== Demographics ==
Historical population Canton of Saint-André-les-Alpes
Year	1962	1968	1975	1982	1990	1999
Pop.	1,278	1,501	1,434	1,407	1,371	1,463
±%	—	+17.4%	−4.5%	−1.9%	−2.6%	+6.7%
From the year 1962 on: No double counting – residents of multiple communes (e.g. students and military personnel) are counted only once. Source: INSEE

== See also ==
- Cantons of the Alpes-de-Haute-Provence department
