= Canton of Allos-Colmars =

Coordinates: 44°10′56″N 6°37′38″E

Allos-Colmars
- Former canton
- Interactive map of Allos-Colmars
- Country: France
- Region: Provence-Alpes-Côte d'Azur
- Department: Alpes-de-Haute-Provence
- No. of communes: {{{nbcomm}}}
- Disbanded: 2015
- Area: 472.11 km^{2} (182.28 sq mi)
- Population (2012): 2,097
  - Density: 4.442/km^{2} (11.50/sq mi)

The canton of Allos-Colmars is a former administrative division in southeastern France. It was disbanded following the French canton reorganisation which came into effect in March 2015. It consisted of 6 communes, which joined the canton of Castellane in 2015. It had 2,097 inhabitants (2012).

The canton comprised the following communes:

- Allos
- Beauvezer
- Colmars
- Thorame-Basse
- Thorame-Haute
- Villars-Colmars

== Demographics ==
Historical population Canton of Allos-Colmars
Year	1962	1968	1975	1982	1990	1999
Pop.	1,373	1,549	1,508	1,674	1,853	1,827
±%	—	+12.8%	−2.6%	+11.0%	+10.7%	−1.4%
From the year 1962 on: No double counting – residents of multiple communes (e.g. students and military personnel) are counted only once. Source: INSEE

== See also ==
- Cantons of the Alpes-de-Haute-Provence department
