= Braux, Alpes-de-Haute-Provence =

Braux
- Commune
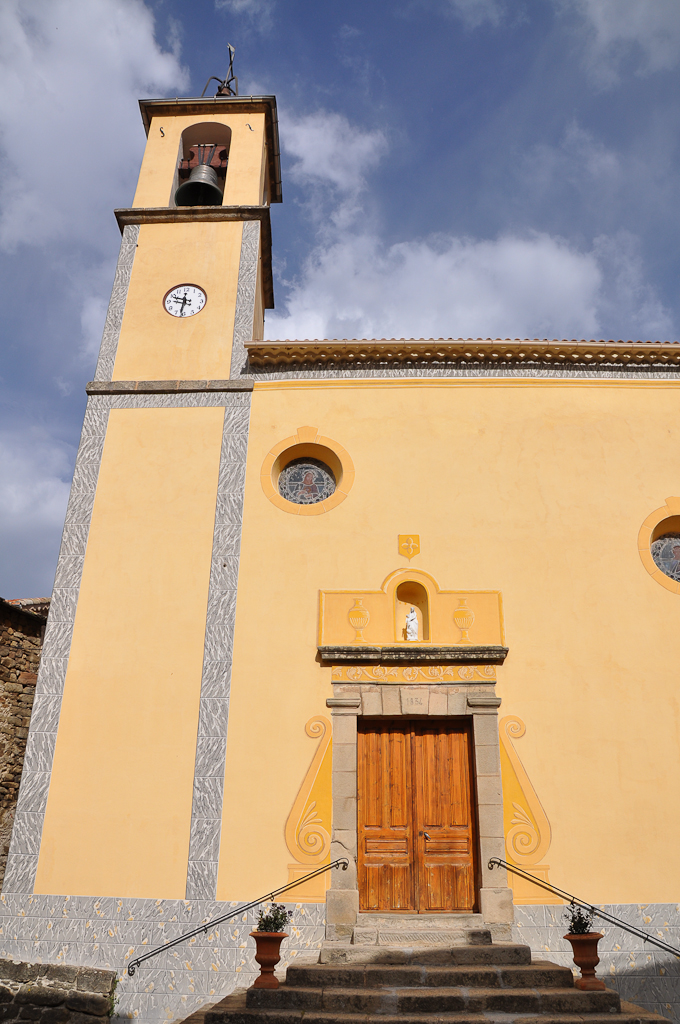
- The church in Braux

- Coat of arms
- Location of Braux
- Location within France Location within Provence-Alpes-Côte d'Azur
- Coordinates: 43°59′12″N 6°42′03″E
- Country: France
- Region: Provence-Alpes-Côte d'Azur
- Department: Alpes-de-Haute-Provence
- Arrondissement: Castellane
- Canton: Castellane
- Intercommunality: Alpes Provence Verdon - Sources de Lumière

Government
  - Mayor (2026–32): Stéphane Grac
- Area^{1}: 11.67 km^{2} (4.51 sq mi)
- Elevation: 950 m (3,120 ft)
- Highest elevation: 1,600 m (5,200 ft)
- Lowest elevation: 639 m (2,096 ft)
- Population (2023): 139
  - Density: 11.9/km^{2} (30.8/sq mi)
- Time zone: UTC+01:00 (CET)
  - Summer (DST): UTC+02:00 (CEST)
- INSEE/Postal code: 04032 /04240
- ^{1} French Land Register data, which excludes lakes, ponds, glaciers > 1 km^{2} (0.386 sq mi or 247 acres) and river estuaries.

Braux (French pronunciation: [bʁo]; Occitan: Brau) is a commune in the Alpes-de-Haute-Provence department in southeastern France.

== Geography ==
The village is located at 950m of altitude, at the end of a road, in the valley of Coulomp. The road leading to it continues along a semi-tarred trail to the hamlet of Chabrières.

The adjoining communities of Braux are Le Fugeret, Castellet-lès-Sausses, Saint-Benoît and Annot.

Bois du Fa to the north of the village.

=== Geology ===
The village is set on a local resurgence of sandstone dating from the Oligocene (the same as Ann ot) in the middle of marl and limestone of the Jurassic and the Eocene.

=== Relief ===
- Crest of Clos Martin (1,522 m and 1,607 m);
- Rock of Pelloussis (1,340 m)

=== Environment ===
The commune counts 639 ha of woods and forests.

=== Natural and technological hazards ===
None of the 200 municipalities in the department is in a zero seismic risk zone. Braux is in zone 1b (low risk) according to the deterministic classification of 1991, based on historical earthquakes, and zone 4 (medium risk) according to the probabilistic classification EC8 of 2011. The municipality of Braux is also exposed to three other natural hazards:

- Forest fire,
- flood,
- Land movement: the municipality is almost entirely concerned by an average to high risk.

The commune of Braux is not exposed to any of the risks of technological origin identified by the prefecture.

No plan for risk prevention foreseeable natural (PPR) exists for the municipality and DICRIM are not.

The most sensitive earthquake in the commune is that of February 23, 1887, with a macro-seismic intensity of VII on the scale MSK and Imperia-Bussana for epicenter. Among the recent landslides and landslides, the most important ones are those of 1978 and 5 November 1994. One of 1994 concerns an area of 13 hectares on a thickness of 6 m, below the Rocher des Meules (Ravine de la Lauriere ), which had won several farms.

== Population ==
Historical population
Year	Pop.	±% p.a.
1968	206	—
1975	153	−4.16%
1982	160	+0.64%
1990	133	−2.28%
1999	118	−1.32%
2007	130	+1.22%
2012	125	−0.78%
2017	125	+0.00%
2023	139	+1.79%
Source: INSEE

== See also ==
- Communes of the Alpes-de-Haute-Provence department
