= Annot (disambiguation) =

Annot is a commune in southeastern France.

Annot may also refer to:

- Canton of Annot, a former administrative division in southeastern France
- Annot (artist), née Anna Ottilie Krigar-Menzel (1894–1981), also known as Annot Jacobi, German painter, art teacher, art writer and pacifist
- Annot Robinson (1874–1925), Scottish suffragette and pacifist
- Annot Lyle, a main character in the novel A Legend of Montrose by Sir Walter Scott
- Annot Alyface, a character in Ralph Roister Doister, a 16th-century play considered the first comedy written in English
