= Lac de Castillon =

Lake in Alpes-de-Haute-Provence, France

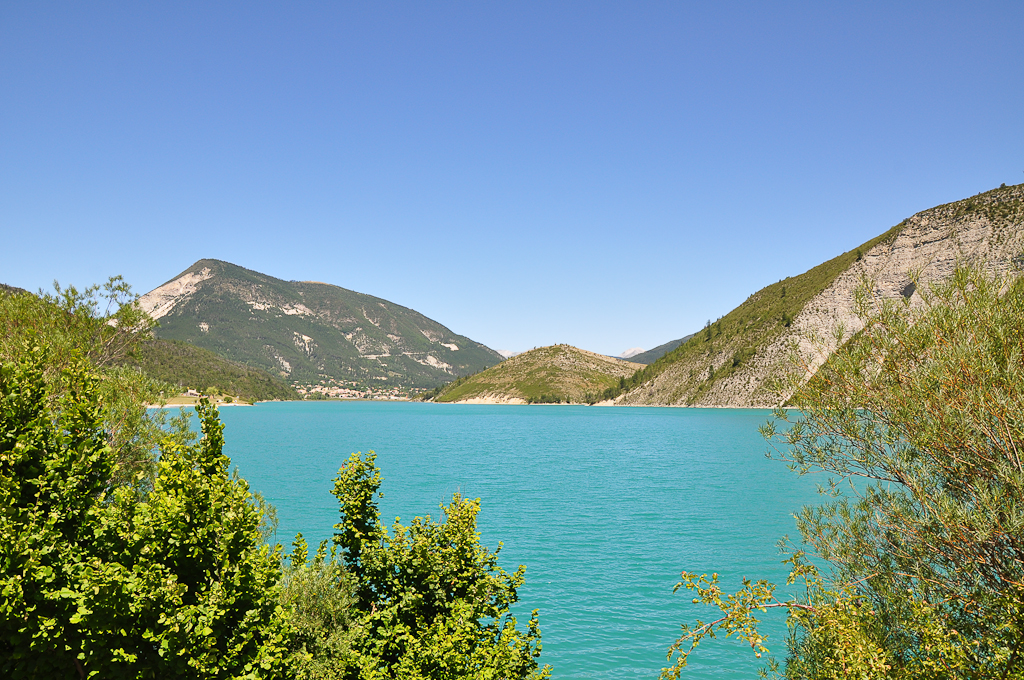
- A view of the Lac de Castillon's northern shores at Saint-André-les-Alpes

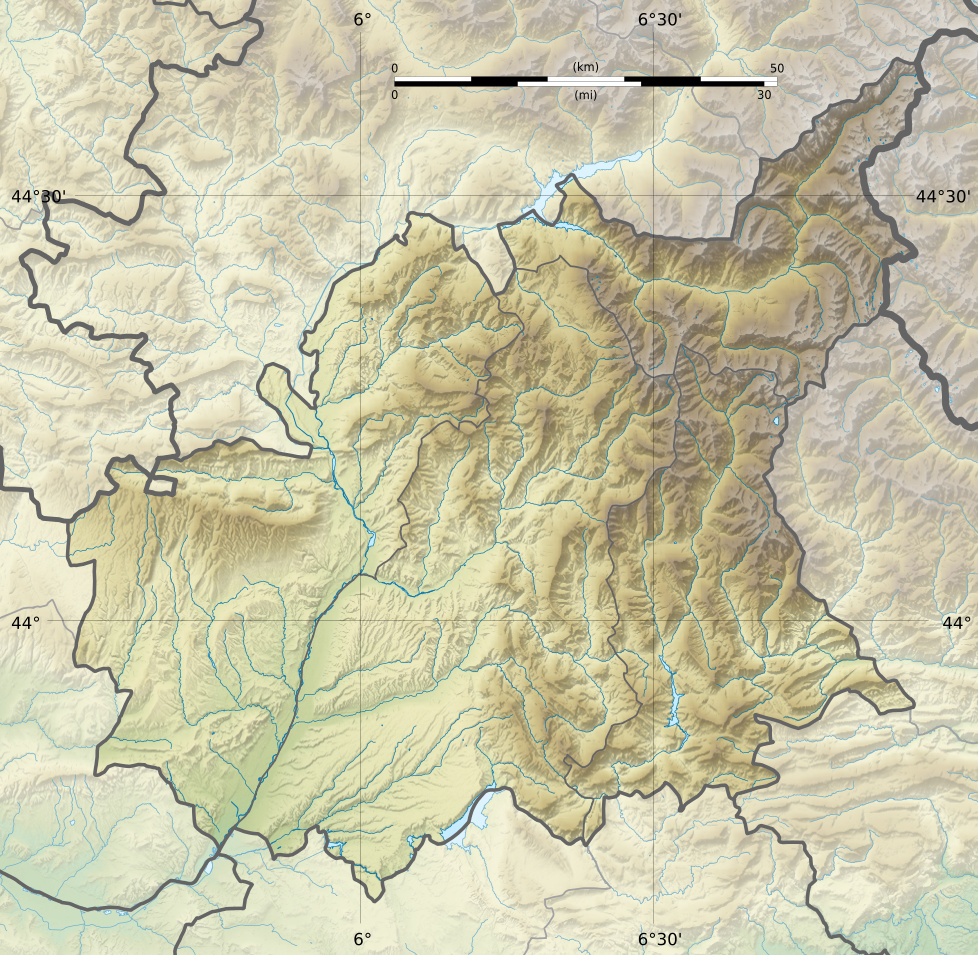
- Location within Alpes-de-Haute-Provence
- Location: Alpes-de-Haute-Provence
- Coordinates: 43°54′N 6°32′E
- Type: Artificial
- Primary outflows: Verdon
- Catchment area: 655 km^{2} (253 sq mi)
- Basin countries: France
- Max. length: 8 km (5.0 mi)
- Surface area: 5 km^{2} (1.9 sq mi)
- Max. depth: 100 m (330 ft)
- Water volume: 150,000,000 m^{3} (5.3×10^{9} cu ft)
- Surface elevation: 880 m (2,890 ft)

The Lac de Castillon (English: Lake of Castillon) is a reservoir in the Alpes-de-Haute-Provence department, Southeastern France. At an elevation of 880 m (2,890 ft), the lake's surface area is 5 km^{2} (1.9 sq mi). The Castillon dam holds 150,000,000 m^{3} (5.3×10^{9} cu ft) of water.

Upon its creation in 1948, the lake submerged the former village of Castillon (after which it was named), the commune of which was then merged with Castellane.

== Military testing facility ==
The Lac de Castillon houses a military testing facility to the southwest of Saint-Julien-du-Verdon, operated by the Direction générale de l'armement (DGA) of the Ministry of Armed Forces.

== Gallery ==
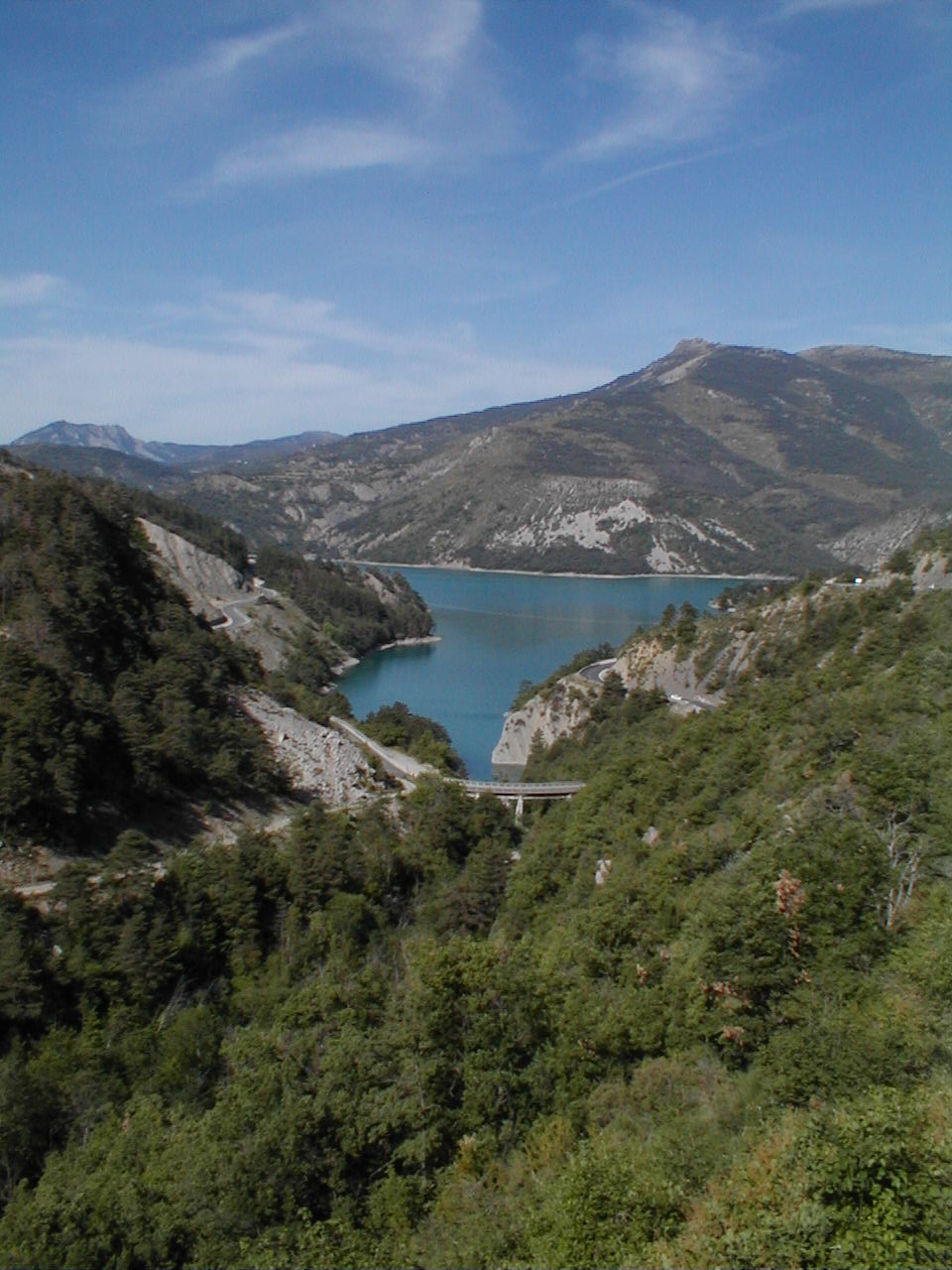
General view, June 2006

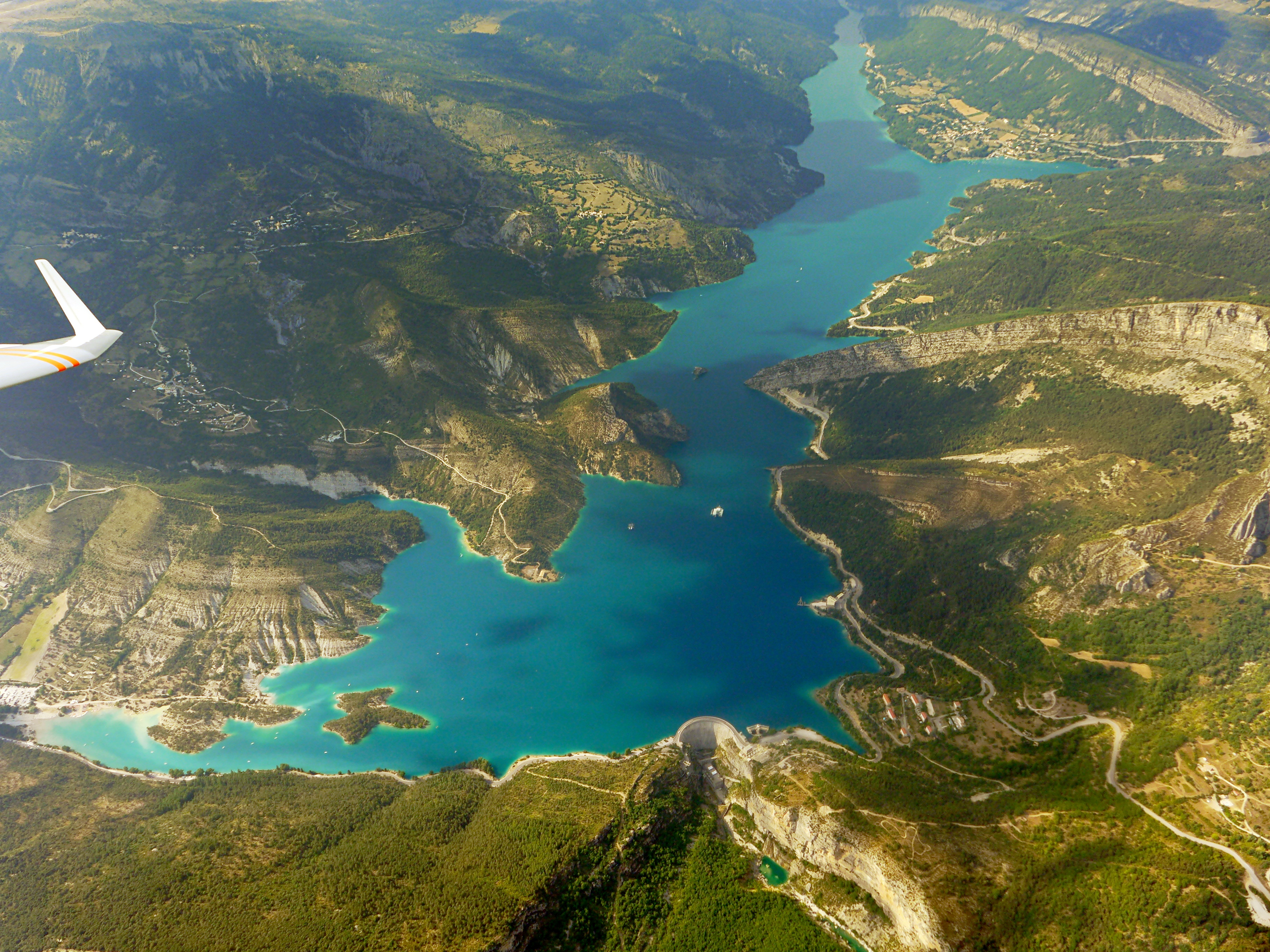
Aerial view, July 2015

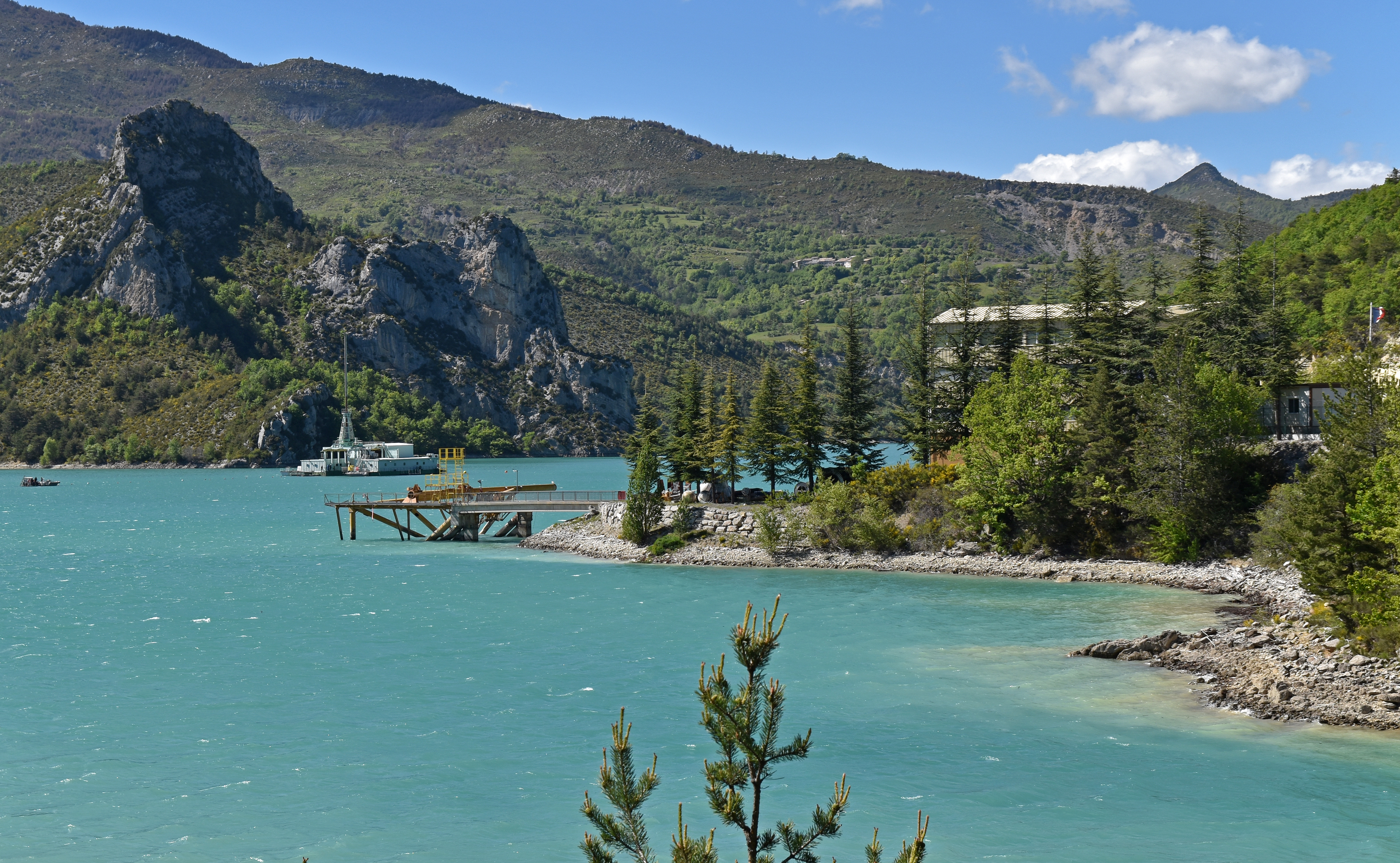
DGA testing facility
