= La Garde, Alpes-de-Haute-Provence =

La Garde
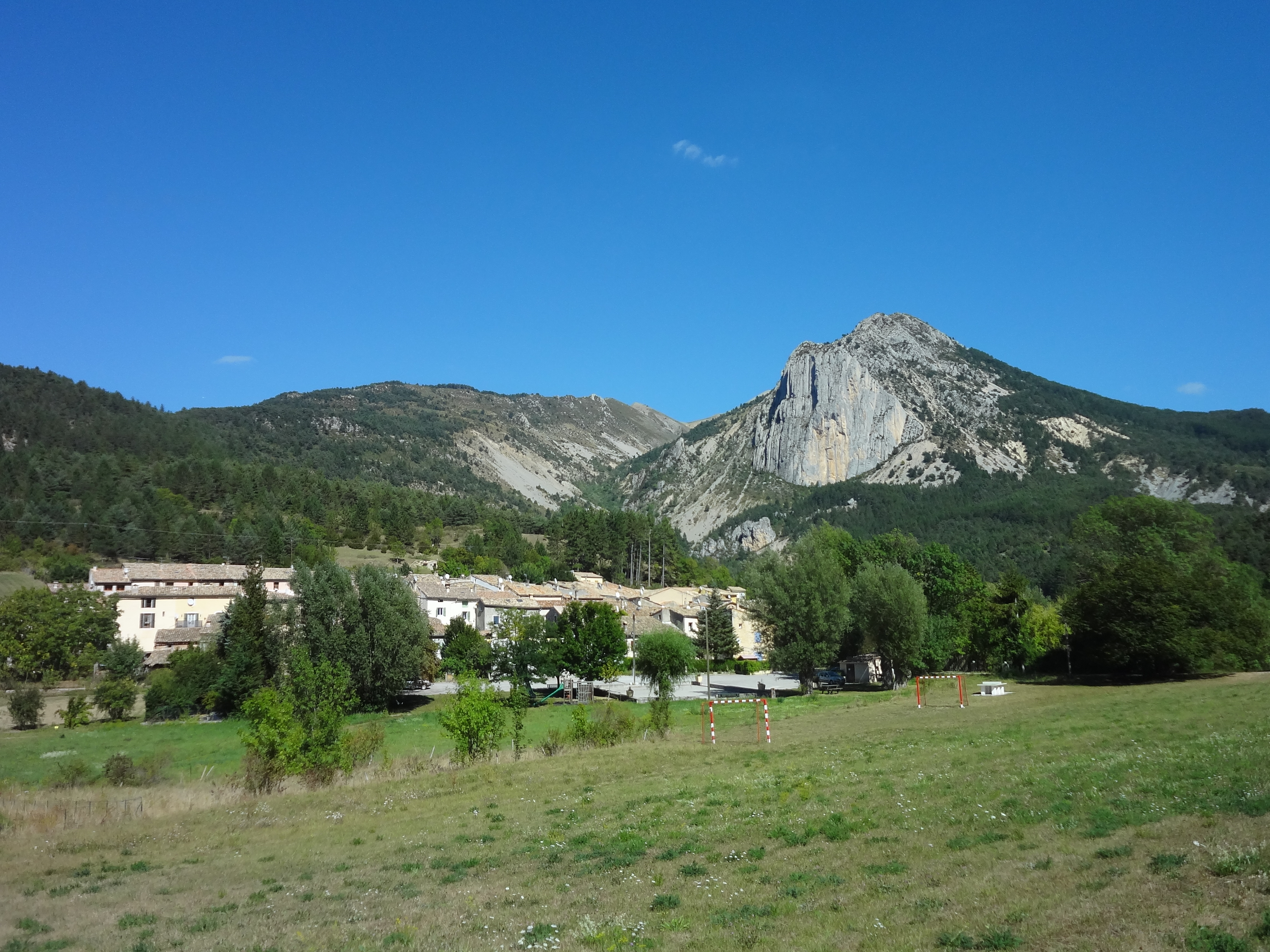
- The village of La Garde overlooked by La Rocher Saint-Martin

- Coat of arms
- Location of La Garde
- Location within France Location within Provence-Alpes-Côte d'Azur
- Coordinates: 43°49′51″N 6°33′29″E
- Country: France
- Region: Provence-Alpes-Côte d'Azur
- Department: Alpes-de-Haute-Provence
- Arrondissement: Castellane
- Canton: Castellane

Government
  - Mayor (2026–32): Joel Laugier
- Area^{1}: 16.63 km^{2} (6.42 sq mi)
- Elevation: 900 m (3,000 ft)
- Highest elevation: 1,894 m (6,214 ft)
- Lowest elevation: 777 m (2,549 ft)
- Population (2023): 121
  - Density: 7.28/km^{2} (18.8/sq mi)
- Time zone: UTC+01:00 (CET)
  - Summer (DST): UTC+02:00 (CEST)
- INSEE/Postal code: 04092 /04120
- ^{1} French Land Register data, which excludes lakes, ponds, glaciers > 1 km^{2} (0.386 sq mi or 247 acres) and river estuaries.

La Garde (French pronunciation: [la ɡaʁd]; Occitan: La Garda) is a commune in the Alpes-de-Haute-Provence department in southeastern France.

== Population ==
Historical population
Year	Pop.	±% p.a.
1968	54	—
1975	65	+2.68%
1982	68	+0.65%
1990	88	+3.28%
1999	56	−4.90%
2007	89	+5.96%
2012	85	−0.92%
2017	89	+0.92%
2023	121	+5.25%
Source: INSEE

== See also ==
- Communes of the Alpes-de-Haute-Provence department
