= Demandolx =

- Commune
- Coat of arms
- Location of Demandolx
- Location within France Location within Provence-Alpes-Côte d'Azur
- Coordinates: 43°52′15″N 6°34′46″E
- Country: France
- Region: Provence-Alpes-Côte d'Azur
- Department: Alpes-de-Haute-Provence
- Arrondissement: Castellane
- Canton: Castellane

Government
  - Mayor (2026–32): Baptiste Gaglio
- Area^{1}: 20.37 km^{2} (7.86 sq mi)
- Elevation: 1,100 m (3,600 ft)
- Highest elevation: 1,894 m (6,214 ft)
- Lowest elevation: 788 m (2,585 ft)
- Population (2023): 112
  - Density: 5.50/km^{2} (14.2/sq mi)
- Time zone: UTC+01:00 (CET)
  - Summer (DST): UTC+02:00 (CEST)
- INSEE/Postal code: 04069 /04120
- ^{1} French Land Register data, which excludes lakes, ponds, glaciers > 1 km^{2} (0.386 sq mi or 247 acres) and river estuaries.

Demandolx is a commune in the Alpes-de-Haute-Provence department in southeastern France.

== Population ==
Historical population
Year	Pop.	±% p.a.
1968	91	—
1975	83	−1.31%
1982	72	−2.01%
1990	95	+3.53%
1999	94	−0.12%
2007	135	+4.63%
2012	118	−2.66%
2017	135	+2.73%
2023	112	−3.06%
Source: INSEE

== See also ==
- Communes of the Alpes-de-Haute-Provence department
