= Rougon =

Rougon Rogon (Occitan)
- Commune
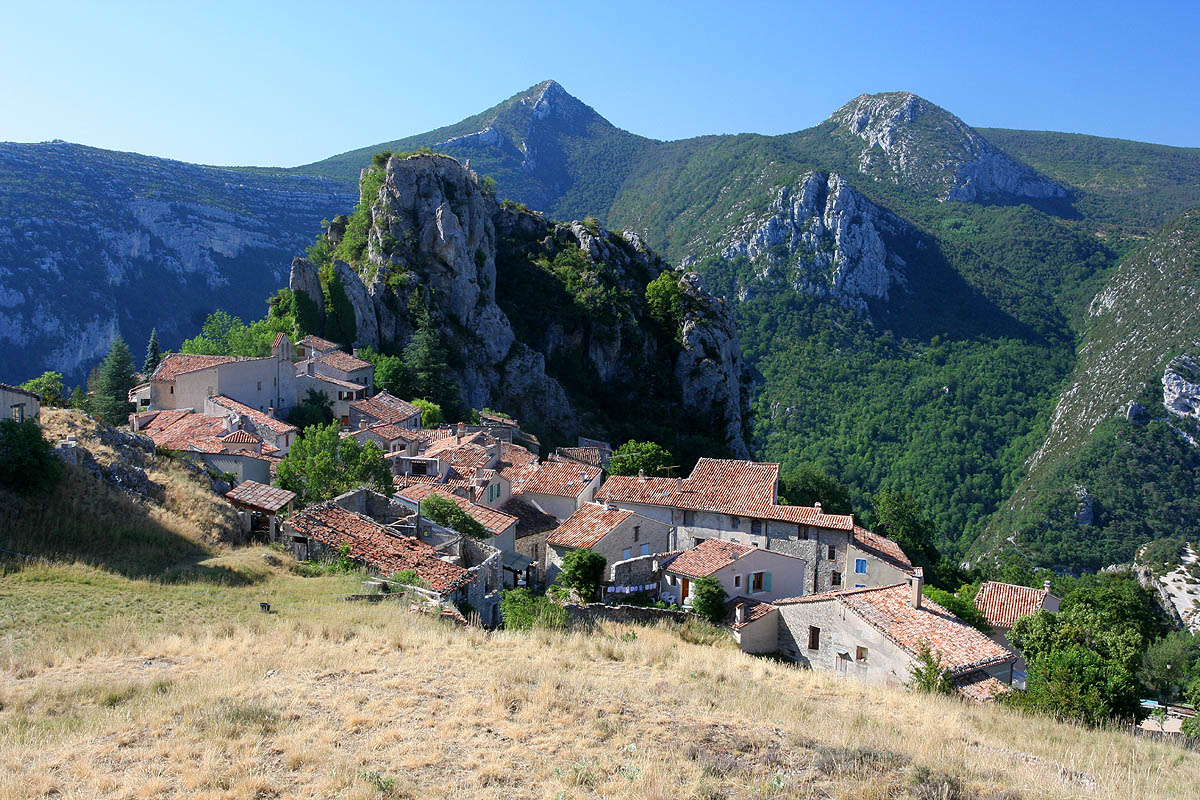
- A general view of the village of Rougon

- Coat of arms
- Location of Rougon
- Location within France Location within Provence-Alpes-Côte d'Azur
- Coordinates: 43°47′57″N 6°24′10″E
- Country: France
- Region: Provence-Alpes-Côte d'Azur
- Department: Alpes-de-Haute-Provence
- Arrondissement: Castellane
- Canton: Castellane

Government
  - Mayor (2026–32): Vincent Mariani
- Area^{1}: 35.83 km^{2} (13.83 sq mi)
- Elevation: 930 m (3,050 ft)
- Highest elevation: 1,900 m (6,200 ft)
- Lowest elevation: 568 m (1,864 ft)
- Population (2023): 115
  - Density: 3.21/km^{2} (8.31/sq mi)
- Time zone: UTC+01:00 (CET)
  - Summer (DST): UTC+02:00 (CEST)
- INSEE/Postal code: 04171 /04120
- ^{1} French Land Register data, which excludes lakes, ponds, glaciers > 1 km^{2} (0.386 sq mi or 247 acres) and river estuaries.

Rougon (French pronunciation: [ʁuɡɔ̃]; Occitan: Rogon) is a rural commune in the Alpes-de-Haute-Provence department in the Provence-Alpes-Côte d'Azur region in Southeastern France.

== Demographics ==
Historical population
Year	Pop.	±% p.a.
1968	41	—
1975	40	−0.35%
1982	55	+4.65%
1990	77	+4.30%
1999	85	+1.10%
2007	125	+4.94%
2012	103	−3.80%
2017	110	+1.32%
2023	115	+0.74%
Source: INSEE

== See also ==
- Communes of the Alpes-de-Haute-Provence department
