= Peyroules =

- Commune
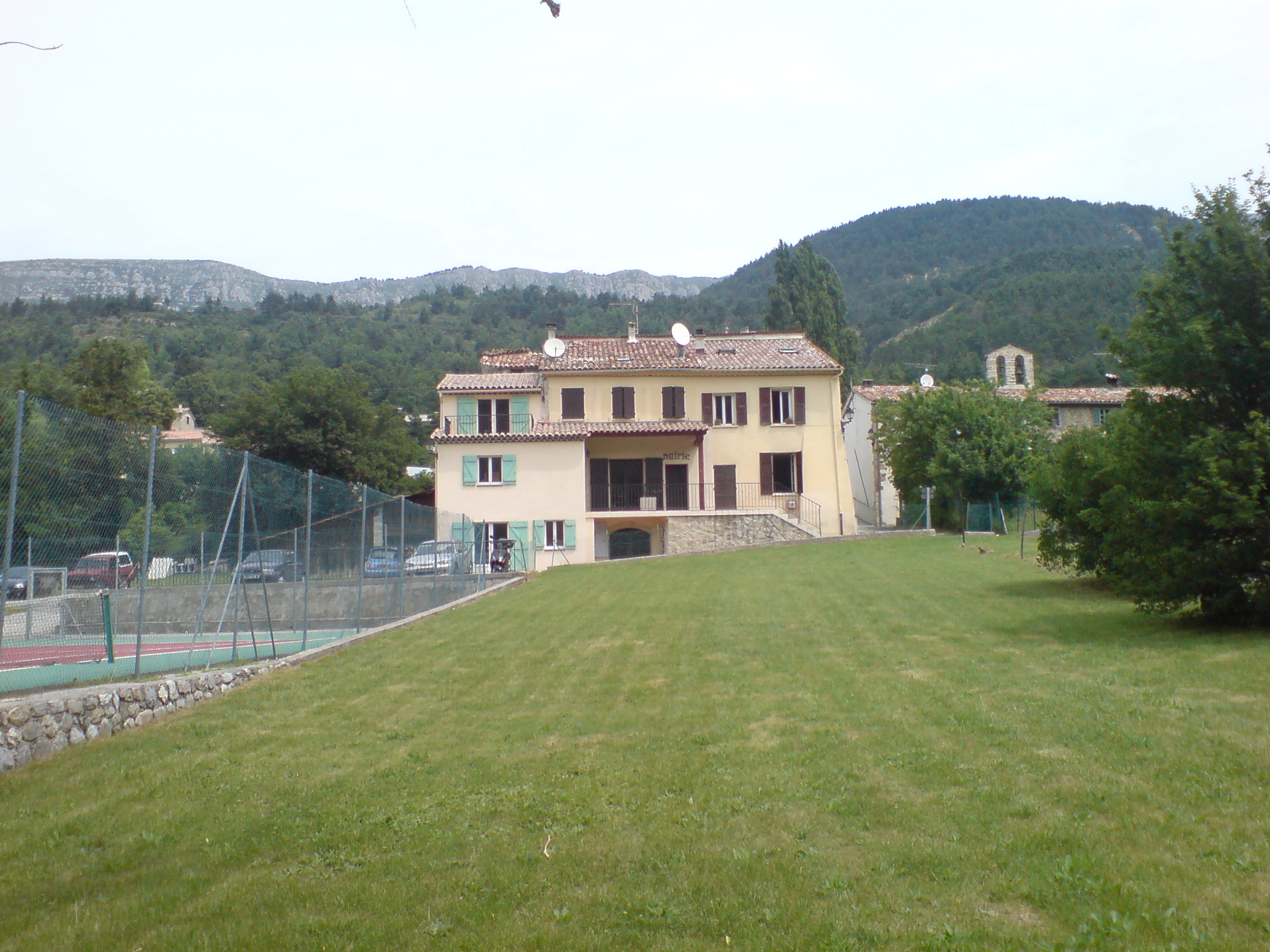
- The town hall and library in Peyroules

- Coat of arms
- Location of Peyroules
- Location within France Location within Provence-Alpes-Côte d'Azur
- Coordinates: 43°48′59″N 6°38′37″E
- Country: France
- Region: Provence-Alpes-Côte d'Azur
- Department: Alpes-de-Haute-Provence
- Arrondissement: Castellane
- Canton: Castellane
- Intercommunality: Alpes Provence Verdon - Sources de Lumière

Government
  - Mayor (2026–32): Frédéric Cluet
- Area^{1}: 33.34 km^{2} (12.87 sq mi)
- Elevation: 1,025 m (3,363 ft)
- Highest elevation: 1,894 m (6,214 ft)
- Lowest elevation: 919 m (3,015 ft)
- Population (2023): 255
  - Density: 7.65/km^{2} (19.8/sq mi)
- Time zone: UTC+01:00 (CET)
  - Summer (DST): UTC+02:00 (CEST)
- INSEE/Postal code: 04148 /04120
- ^{1} French Land Register data, which excludes lakes, ponds, glaciers > 1 km^{2} (0.386 sq mi or 247 acres) and river estuaries.

Peyroules (French pronunciation: [peʁul]; Occitan: Peirolas) is a commune in the Alpes-de-Haute-Provence department in southeastern France.

== Population ==
Historical population
Year	Pop.	±% p.a.
1968	91	—
1975	82	−1.48%
1982	91	+1.50%
1990	109	+2.28%
1999	136	+2.49%
2007	216	+5.95%
2012	227	+1.00%
2017	240	+1.12%
2023	255	+1.02%
Source: INSEE

== See also ==
- Communes of the Alpes-de-Haute-Provence department
