= Soleilhas =

- Commune
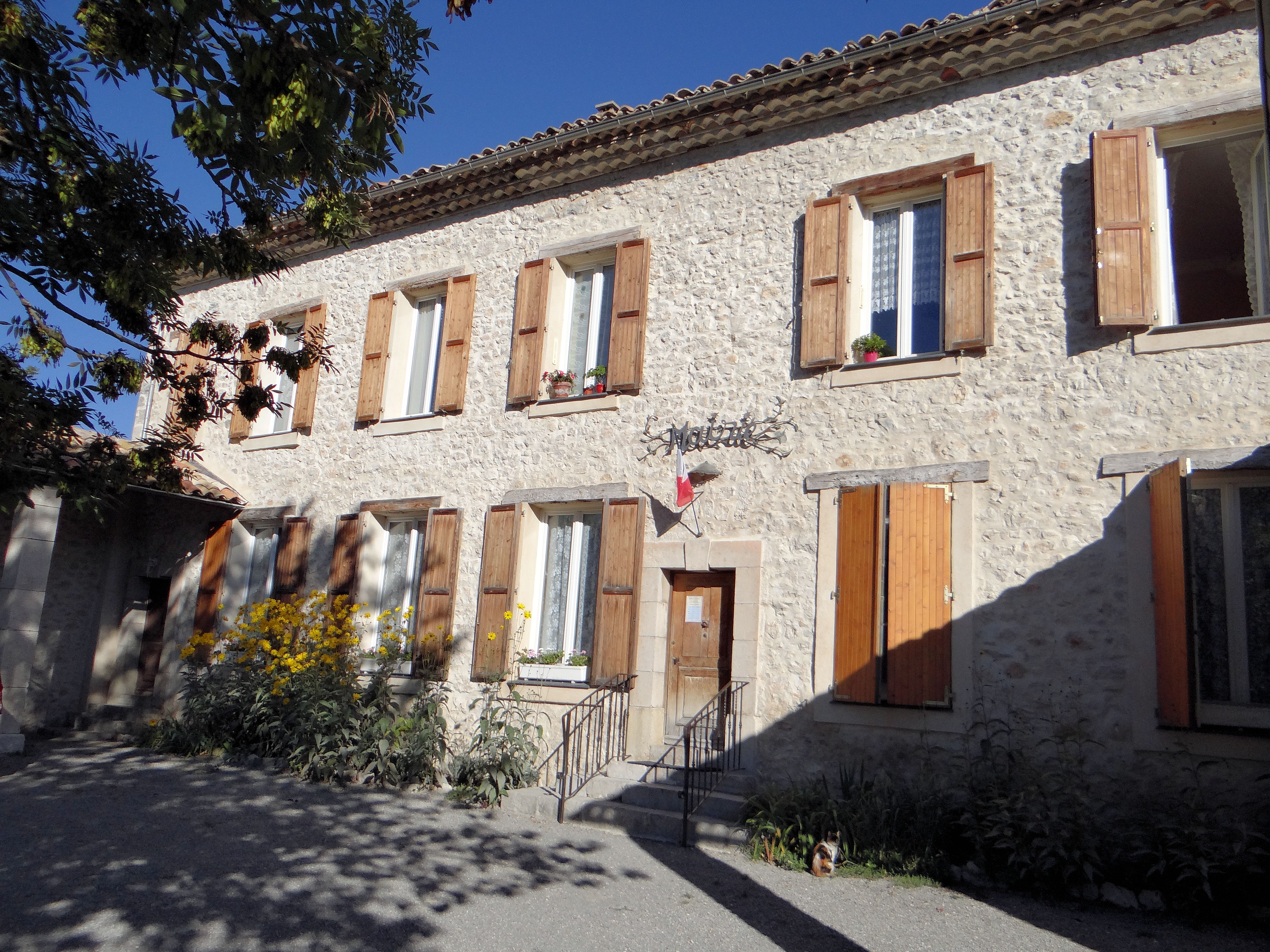
- The town hall of Soleilhas

- Coat of arms
- Location of Soleilhas
- Location within France Location within Provence-Alpes-Côte d'Azur
- Coordinates: 43°51′29″N 6°39′00″E
- Country: France
- Region: Provence-Alpes-Côte d'Azur
- Department: Alpes-de-Haute-Provence
- Arrondissement: Castellane
- Canton: Castellane
- Intercommunality: Alpes Provence Verdon - Sources de Lumière

Government
  - Mayor (2026–32): Eric Senes
- Area^{1}: 34.53 km^{2} (13.33 sq mi)
- Elevation: 1,600 m (5,200 ft)
- Highest elevation: 1,894 m (6,214 ft)
- Lowest elevation: 931 m (3,054 ft)
- Population (2023): 95
  - Density: 2.8/km^{2} (7.1/sq mi)
- Time zone: UTC+01:00 (CET)
  - Summer (DST): UTC+02:00 (CEST)
- INSEE/Postal code: 04210 /04120
- ^{1} French Land Register data, which excludes lakes, ponds, glaciers > 1 km^{2} (0.386 sq mi or 247 acres) and river estuaries.

Soleilhas (Occitan: Ombrelhas) is a commune in the Alpes-de-Haute-Provence department in southeastern France.

== Population ==
Historical population
Year	Pop.	±% p.a.
1968	76	—
1975	60	−3.32%
1982	85	+5.10%
1990	93	+1.13%
1999	95	+0.24%
2007	109	+1.73%
2012	119	+1.77%
2017	100	−3.42%
2023	95	−0.85%
Source: INSEE

== See also ==
- Communes of the Alpes-de-Haute-Provence department
