= Saint-Julien-du-Verdon =

Saint-Julien-du-Verdon Sant Julian de Verdon (Occitan)
- Commune
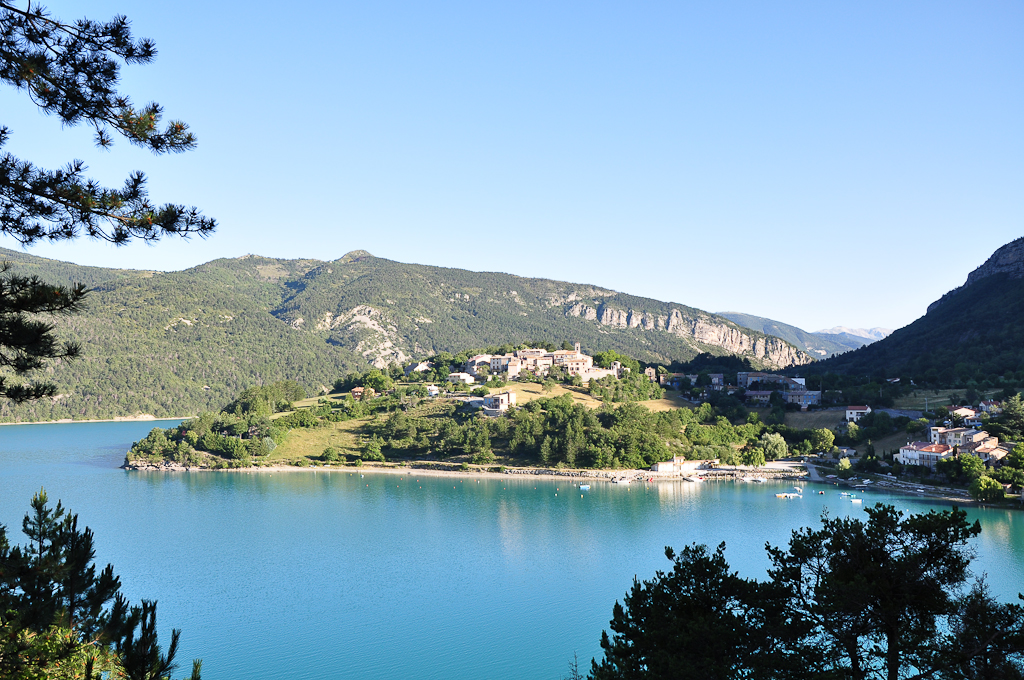
- A view of the village of Saint-Julien-du-Verdon on the Lac de Castillon

- Coat of arms
- Location of Saint-Julien-du-Verdon
- Location within France Location within Provence-Alpes-Côte d'Azur
- Coordinates: 43°54′50″N 6°32′27″E
- Country: France
- Region: Provence-Alpes-Côte d'Azur
- Department: Alpes-de-Haute-Provence
- Arrondissement: Castellane
- Canton: Castellane

Government
  - Mayor (2026–32): Thierry Collomp
- Area^{1}: 6.19 km^{2} (2.39 sq mi)
- Elevation: 914 m (2,999 ft)
- Highest elevation: 1,760 m (5,770 ft)
- Lowest elevation: 869 m (2,851 ft)
- Population (2023): 179
  - Density: 28.9/km^{2} (74.9/sq mi)
- Time zone: UTC+01:00 (CET)
  - Summer (DST): UTC+02:00 (CEST)
- INSEE/Postal code: 04183 /04170
- ^{1} French Land Register data, which excludes lakes, ponds, glaciers > 1 km^{2} (0.386 sq mi or 247 acres) and river estuaries.

Saint-Julien-du-Verdon (French pronunciation: [sɛ̃ ʒyljɛ̃ dy vɛʁdɔ̃], lit. "Saint Julien of the Verdon"; Provençal Occitan: Sant Julian de Verdon) is a rural commune in the Alpes-de-Haute-Provence department in the Provence-Alpes-Côte d'Azur region in Southeastern France.

== Demographics ==
Historical population
Year	Pop.	±% p.a.
1968	64	—
1975	66	+0.44%
1982	67	+0.22%
1990	94	+4.32%
1999	108	+1.55%
2007	134	+2.73%
2012	154	+2.82%
2017	144	−1.33%
2023	179	+3.69%
Source: INSEE

== See also ==
- Communes of the Alpes-de-Haute-Provence department
