= La Rochette, Alpes-de-Haute-Provence =

La Rochette
- Commune
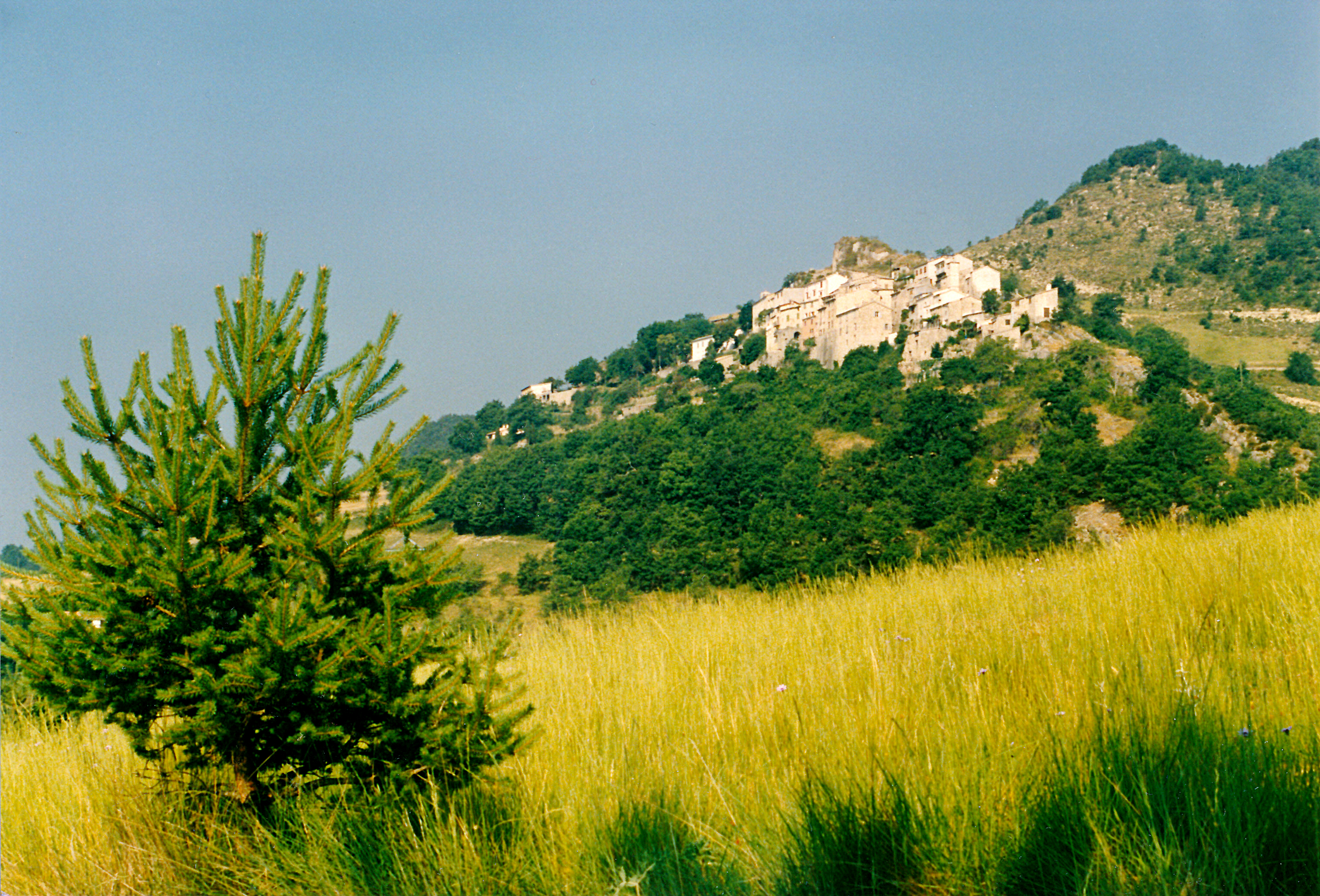
- A general view of the village of La Rochette

- Coat of arms
- Location of La Rochette
- Location within France Location within Provence-Alpes-Côte d'Azur
- Coordinates: 43°54′56″N 6°53′29″E
- Country: France
- Region: Provence-Alpes-Côte d'Azur
- Department: Alpes-de-Haute-Provence
- Arrondissement: Castellane
- Canton: Castellane

Government
  - Mayor (2026–32): Claude Drogoul
- Area^{1}: 18.8 km^{2} (7.3 sq mi)
- Elevation: 850 m (2,790 ft)
- Highest elevation: 1,505 m (4,938 ft)
- Lowest elevation: 637 m (2,090 ft)
- Population (2023): 74
  - Density: 3.9/km^{2} (10/sq mi)
- Time zone: UTC+01:00 (CET)
  - Summer (DST): UTC+02:00 (CEST)
- INSEE/Postal code: 04170 /06260
- ^{1} French Land Register data, which excludes lakes, ponds, glaciers > 1 km^{2} (0.386 sq mi or 247 acres) and river estuaries.

La Rochette (French pronunciation: [la ʁɔʃɛt]; Occitan: La Roqueta) is a commune in the Alpes-de-Haute-Provence department in southeastern France.

== Population ==
Historical population
Year	Pop.	±% p.a.
1968	74	—
1975	66	−1.62%
1982	41	−6.58%
1990	48	+1.99%
1999	53	+1.11%
2007	56	+0.69%
2012	62	+2.06%
2017	70	+2.46%
2023	74	+0.93%
Source: INSEE

== See also ==
- Communes of the Alpes-de-Haute-Provence department
