= Moriez =

- Commune
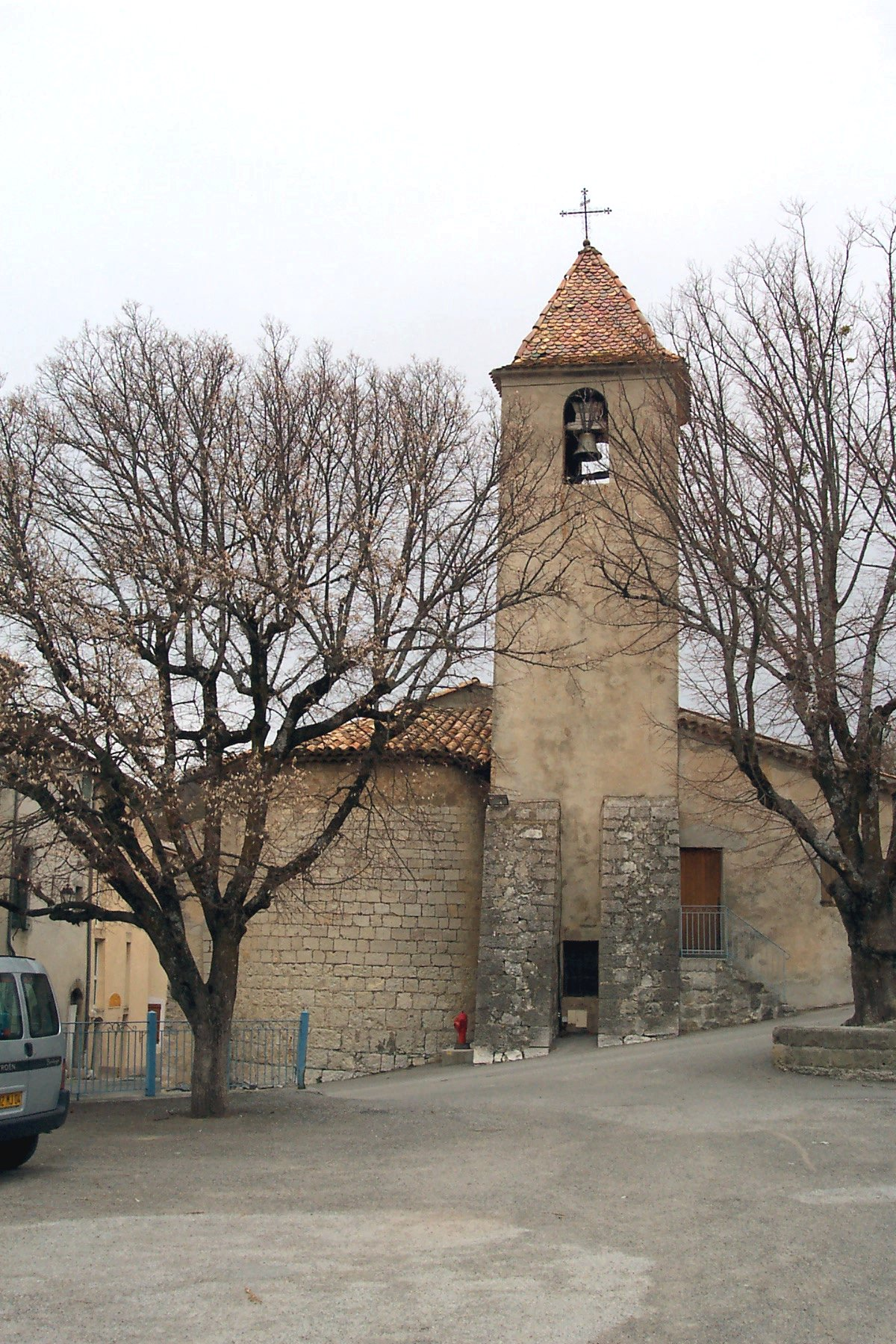
- The church in Moriez

- Coat of arms
- Location of Moriez
- Location within France Location within Provence-Alpes-Côte d'Azur
- Coordinates: 43°57′45″N 6°28′17″E
- Country: France
- Region: Provence-Alpes-Côte d'Azur
- Department: Alpes-de-Haute-Provence
- Arrondissement: Castellane
- Canton: Castellane

Government
  - Mayor (2026–32): Annabelle Béraud
- Area^{1}: 37.18 km^{2} (14.36 sq mi)
- Elevation: 900 m (3,000 ft)
- Highest elevation: 1,700 m (5,600 ft)
- Lowest elevation: 820 m (2,690 ft)
- Population (2023): 238
  - Density: 6.40/km^{2} (16.6/sq mi)
- Time zone: UTC+01:00 (CET)
  - Summer (DST): UTC+02:00 (CEST)
- INSEE/Postal code: 04133 /04170
- ^{1} French Land Register data, which excludes lakes, ponds, glaciers > 1 km^{2} (0.386 sq mi or 247 acres) and river estuaries.

Moriez (Occitan: Morís) is a commune in the Alpes-de-Haute-Provence department in southeastern France.

== Population ==
Historical population
Year	Pop.	±% p.a.
1968	188	—
1975	168	−1.59%
1982	170	+0.17%
1990	160	−0.75%
1999	178	+1.19%
2007	188	+0.69%
2012	215	+2.72%
2017	238	+2.05%
2023	238	+0.00%
Source: INSEE

== See also ==
- Communes of the Alpes-de-Haute-Provence department
