= Lambruisse =

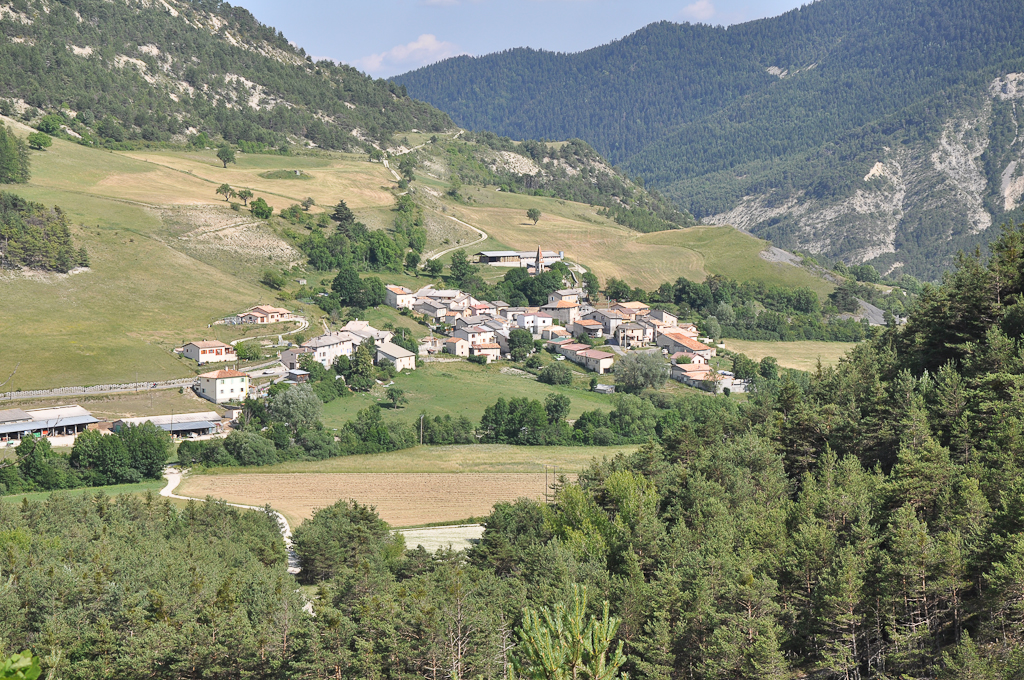
- A general view of the village of Lambruisse

- Coat of arms
- Location of Lambruisse
- Location within France Location within Provence-Alpes-Côte d'Azur
- Coordinates: 44°02′57″N 6°26′34″E
- Country: France
- Region: Provence-Alpes-Côte d'Azur
- Department: Alpes-de-Haute-Provence
- Arrondissement: Castellane
- Canton: Castellane
- Intercommunality: Alpes Provence Verdon - Sources de Lumière

Government
  - Mayor (2026–32): Claude Chailan
- Area^{1}: 21.78 km^{2} (8.41 sq mi)
- Elevation: 1,100 m (3,600 ft)
- Highest elevation: 2,000 m (6,600 ft)
- Lowest elevation: 993 m (3,258 ft)
- Population (2023): 92
  - Density: 4.2/km^{2} (11/sq mi)
- Time zone: UTC+01:00 (CET)
  - Summer (DST): UTC+02:00 (CEST)
- INSEE/Postal code: 04099 /04170
- ^{1} French Land Register data, which excludes lakes, ponds, glaciers > 1 km^{2} (0.386 sq mi or 247 acres) and river estuaries.

Lambruisse (French pronunciation: [lɑ̃bʁɥis]; Occitan: Lambrueissa) is a commune in the Alpes-de-Haute-Provence department in southeastern France.

== Population ==
Historical population
Year	Pop.	±% p.a.
1968	79	—
1975	73	−1.12%
1982	49	−5.54%
1990	55	+1.45%
1999	70	+2.72%
2007	78	+1.36%
2012	94	+3.80%
2017	95	+0.21%
2023	92	−0.53%
Source: INSEE

== See also ==
- Communes of the Alpes-de-Haute-Provence department
