= Villars-Colmars =

- Commune
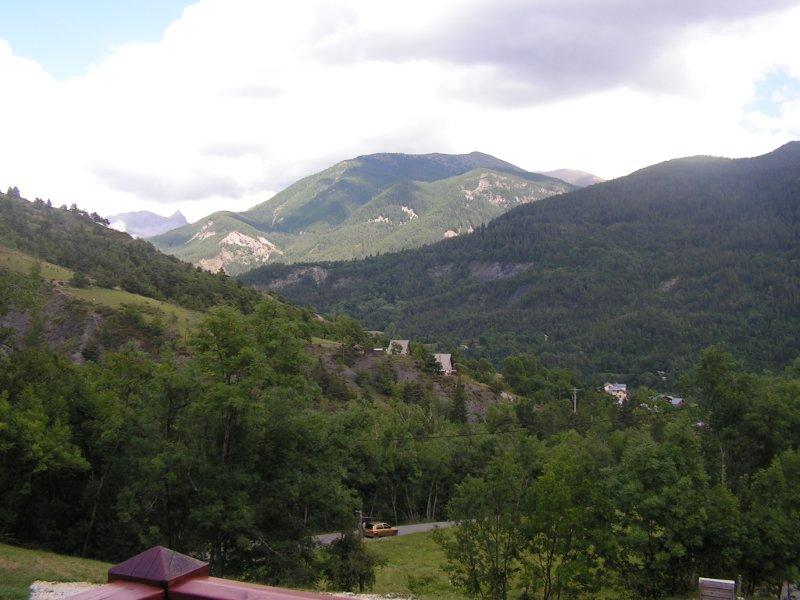
- The landscape around Villars-Colmars

- Coat of arms
- Location of Villars-Colmars
- Location within France Location within Provence-Alpes-Côte d'Azur
- Coordinates: 44°10′03″N 6°36′18″E
- Country: France
- Region: Provence-Alpes-Côte d'Azur
- Department: Alpes-de-Haute-Provence
- Arrondissement: Castellane
- Canton: Castellane

Government
  - Mayor (2026–32): Laurent Roux
- Area^{1}: 40.59 km^{2} (15.67 sq mi)
- Elevation: 1,223 m (4,012 ft)
- Highest elevation: 2,642 m (8,668 ft)
- Lowest elevation: 1,164 m (3,819 ft)
- Population (2023): 257
  - Density: 6.33/km^{2} (16.4/sq mi)
- Time zone: UTC+01:00 (CET)
  - Summer (DST): UTC+02:00 (CEST)
- INSEE/Postal code: 04240 /04370
- ^{1} French Land Register data, which excludes lakes, ponds, glaciers > 1 km^{2} (0.386 sq mi or 247 acres) and river estuaries.

Villars-Colmars is a commune in the Alpes-de-Haute-Provence department in southeastern France.

== Population ==
Historical population
Year	Pop.	±% p.a.
1968	107	—
1975	97	−1.39%
1982	141	+5.49%
1990	203	+4.66%
1999	209	+0.32%
2007	228	+1.09%
2012	257	+2.42%
2017	246	−0.87%
2023	257	+0.73%
Source: INSEE

== See also ==
- Communes of the Alpes-de-Haute-Provence department
