= Vergons =

- Commune
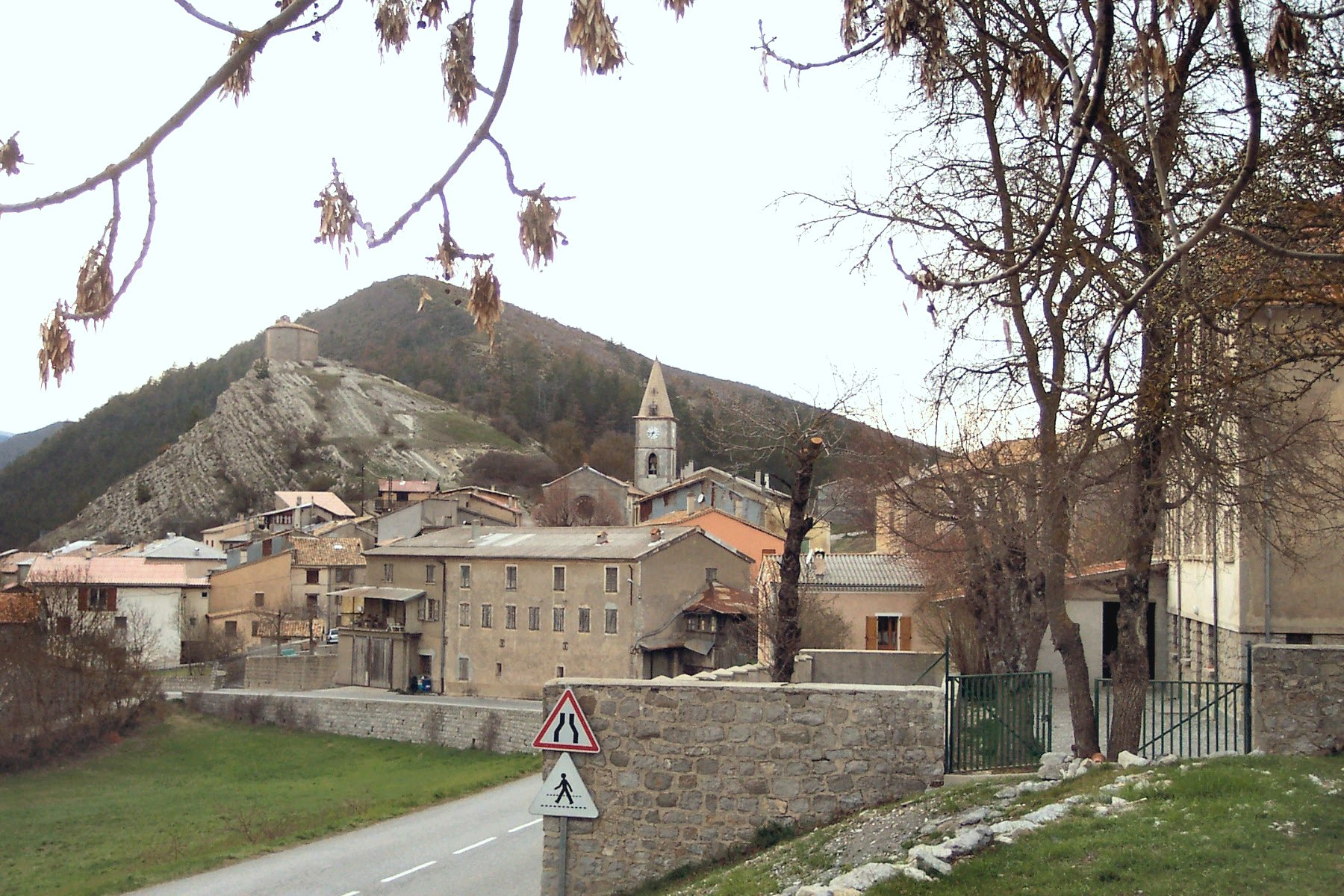
- The church and surrounding buildings in Vergons

- Coat of arms
- Location of Vergons
- Location within France Location within Provence-Alpes-Côte d'Azur
- Coordinates: 43°54′54″N 6°35′17″E
- Country: France
- Region: Provence-Alpes-Côte d'Azur
- Department: Alpes-de-Haute-Provence
- Arrondissement: Castellane
- Canton: Castellane
- Intercommunality: Alpes Provence Verdon - Sources de Lumière

Government
  - Mayor (2026–32): Martial Joubert
- Area^{1}: 45.73 km^{2} (17.66 sq mi)
- Elevation: 1,024 m (3,360 ft)
- Highest elevation: 1,938 m (6,358 ft)
- Lowest elevation: 860 m (2,820 ft)
- Population (2023): 118
  - Density: 2.58/km^{2} (6.68/sq mi)
- Time zone: UTC+01:00 (CET)
  - Summer (DST): UTC+02:00 (CEST)
- INSEE/Postal code: 04236 /04170
- ^{1} French Land Register data, which excludes lakes, ponds, glaciers > 1 km^{2} (0.386 sq mi or 247 acres) and river estuaries.

Vergons is a commune in the Alpes-de-Haute-Provence department in southeastern France.

== Population ==
Historical population
Year	Pop.	±% p.a.
1968	95	—
1975	72	−3.88%
1982	80	+1.52%
1990	108	+3.82%
1999	108	+0.00%
2007	123	+1.64%
2012	116	−1.17%
2017	111	−0.88%
2023	118	+1.02%
Source: INSEE

== See also ==
- Communes of the Alpes-de-Haute-Provence department
