= Ubraye =

- Commune
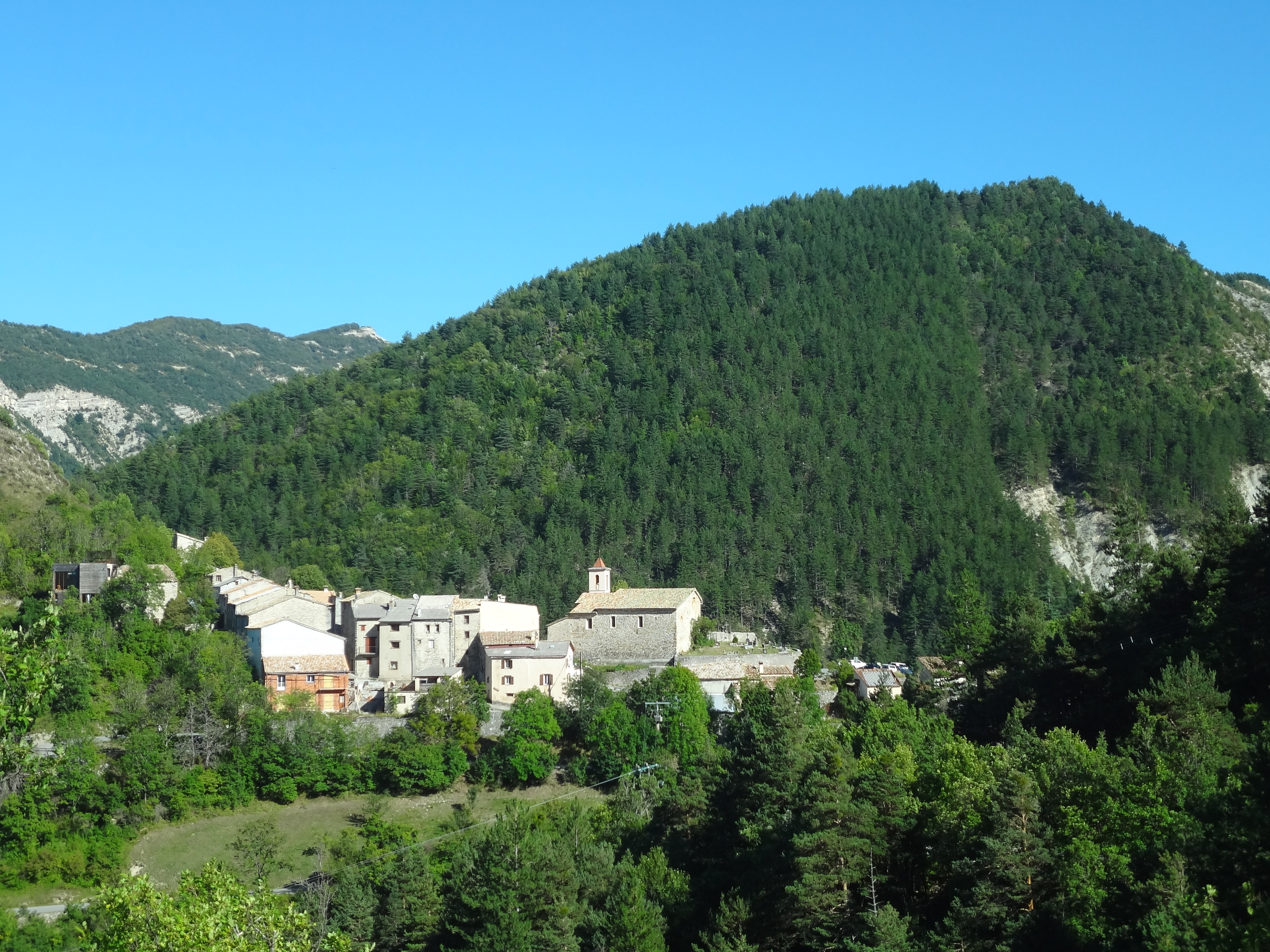
- A general view of the village of Ubraye

- Coat of arms
- Location of Ubraye
- Location within France Location within Provence-Alpes-Côte d'Azur
- Coordinates: 43°54′33″N 6°41′51″E
- Country: France
- Region: Provence-Alpes-Côte d'Azur
- Department: Alpes-de-Haute-Provence
- Arrondissement: Castellane
- Canton: Castellane
- Intercommunality: Alpes Provence Verdon-Sources de Lumière

Government
  - Mayor (2026–32): Claude Roustan
- Area^{1}: 35.65 km^{2} (13.76 sq mi)
- Highest elevation: 1,938 m (6,358 ft)
- Lowest elevation: 720 m (2,360 ft)
- Population (2023): 103
  - Density: 2.89/km^{2} (7.48/sq mi)
- Time zone: UTC+01:00 (CET)
  - Summer (DST): UTC+02:00 (CEST)
- INSEE/Postal code: 04224 /04240
- ^{1} French Land Register data, which excludes lakes, ponds, glaciers > 1 km^{2} (0.386 sq mi or 247 acres) and river estuaries.

Ubraye (French pronunciation: [ybʁaj]; Occitan: Ubraia) is a commune in the Alpes-de-Haute-Provence department in southeastern France.

== Population ==
Historical population
Year	Pop.	±% p.a.
1968	77	—
1975	59	−3.73%
1982	43	−4.42%
1990	104	+11.67%
1999	85	−2.22%
2007	106	+2.80%
2012	97	−1.76%
2017	92	−1.05%
2023	103	+1.90%
Source: INSEE

== See also ==
- Communes of the Alpes-de-Haute-Provence department
