= Sausses =

Sausses Saussas (Occitan)
- Commune
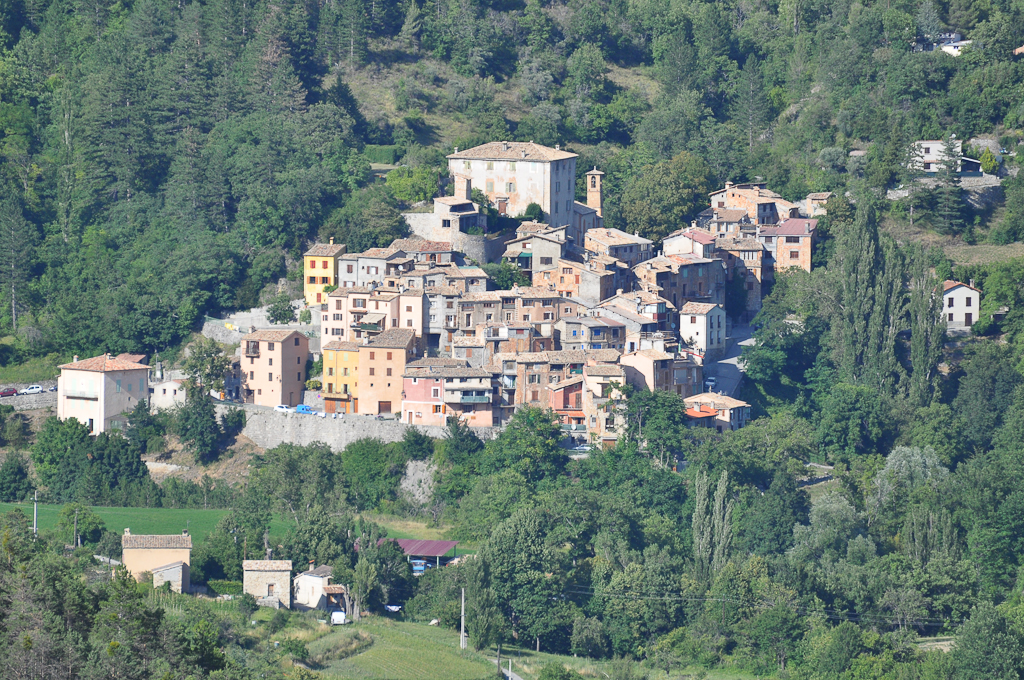
- The château and surrounding buildings in Sausses

- Coat of arms
- Location of Sausses
- Location within France Location within Provence-Alpes-Côte d'Azur
- Coordinates: 44°00′34″N 6°46′58″E
- Country: France
- Region: Provence-Alpes-Côte d'Azur
- Department: Alpes-de-Haute-Provence
- Arrondissement: Castellane
- Canton: Castellane
- Intercommunality: CC Alpes Provence Verdon – Sources de Lumière

Government
  - Mayor (2026–32): Frank Dagonneau
- Area^{1}: 14.68 km^{2} (5.67 sq mi)
- Highest elevation: 2,151 m (7,057 ft)
- Lowest elevation: 568 m (1,864 ft)
- Population (2023): 131
  - Density: 8.92/km^{2} (23.1/sq mi)
- Demonym: Saussois
- Time zone: UTC+01:00 (CET)
  - Summer (DST): UTC+02:00 (CEST)
- INSEE/Postal code: 04202 /04320
- ^{1} French Land Register data, which excludes lakes, ponds, glaciers > 1 km^{2} (0.386 sq mi or 247 acres) and river estuaries.

Sausses (French pronunciation: [sos]; Occitan: Saussas) is a rural commune in the Alpes-de-Haute-Provence department in Southeastern France. It is on the border with Alpes-Maritimes, on the Var River.

== Population ==
Historical population
Year	Pop.	±% p.a.
1968	71	—
1975	33	−10.37%
1982	79	+13.28%
1990	65	−2.41%
1999	65	+0.00%
2007	98	+5.27%
2012	119	+3.96%
2017	127	+1.31%
2023	131	+0.52%
Source: INSEE

== See also ==
- Communes of the Alpes-de-Haute-Provence department
