= Thorame-Basse =

- Commune
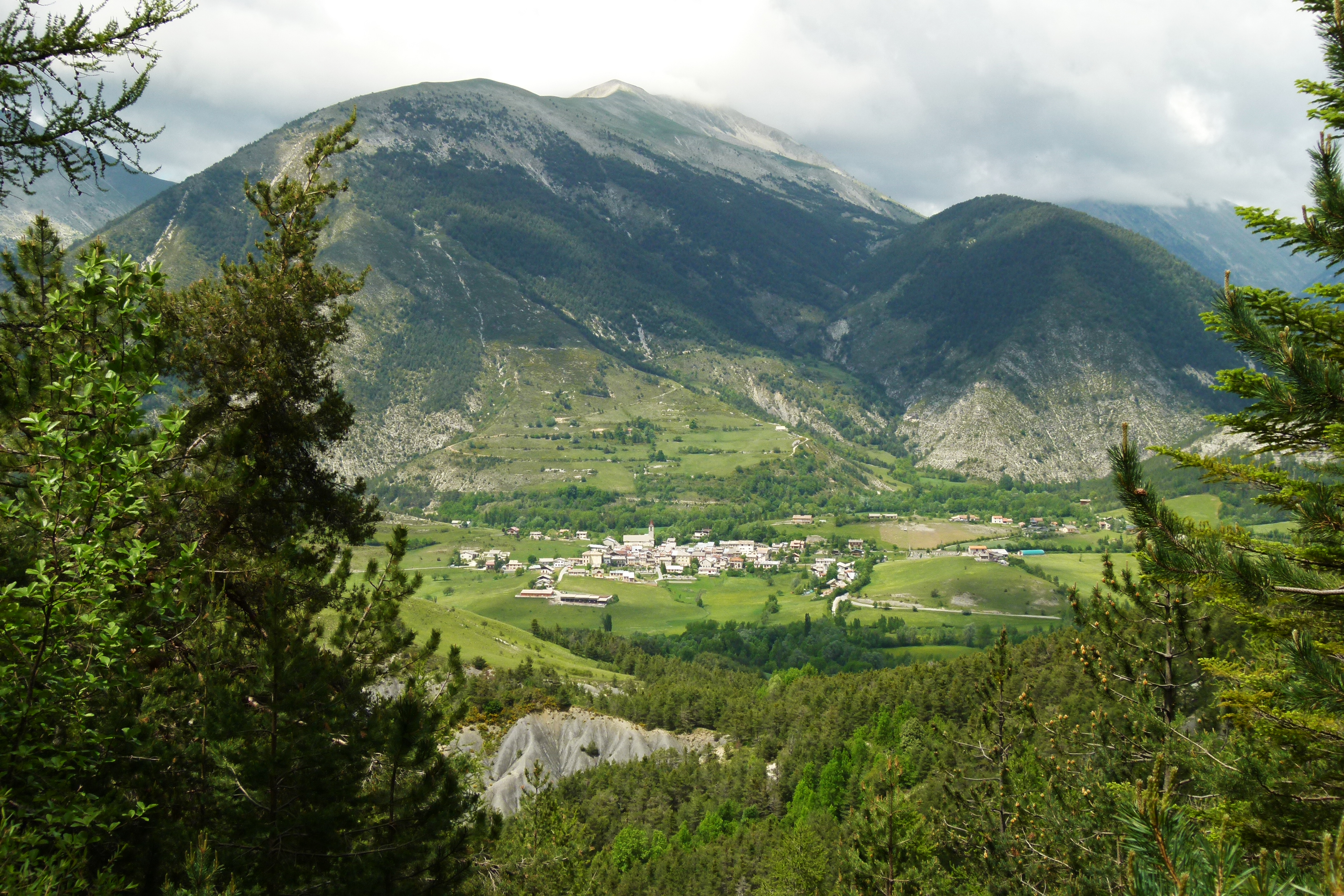
- A general view of the village of Thorame-Basse

- Coat of arms
- Location of Thorame-Basse
- Location within France Location within Provence-Alpes-Côte d'Azur
- Coordinates: 44°05′31″N 6°30′06″E
- Country: France
- Region: Provence-Alpes-Côte d'Azur
- Department: Alpes-de-Haute-Provence
- Arrondissement: Castellane
- Canton: Castellane
- Intercommunality: Alpes Provence Verdon - Sources de Lumière

Government
  - Mayor (2026–32): Robert Liautaud
- Area^{1}: 97.72 km^{2} (37.73 sq mi)
- Highest elevation: 2,395 m (7,858 ft)
- Lowest elevation: 985 m (3,232 ft)
- Population (2023): 206
  - Density: 2.11/km^{2} (5.46/sq mi)
- Time zone: UTC+01:00 (CET)
  - Summer (DST): UTC+02:00 (CEST)
- INSEE/Postal code: 04218 /04170
- Website: www.thorame-basse.fr
- ^{1} French Land Register data, which excludes lakes, ponds, glaciers > 1 km^{2} (0.386 sq mi or 247 acres) and river estuaries.

Thorame-Basse (French pronunciation: [tɔʁam bas]; Occitan: Torama Bassa) is a commune in the Alpes-de-Haute-Provence department in southeastern France.

== Population ==
Historical population
Year	Pop.	±% p.a.
1968	164	—
1975	134	−2.84%
1982	129	−0.54%
1990	146	+1.56%
1999	151	+0.37%
2007	202	+3.70%
2012	222	+1.91%
2017	226	+0.36%
2023	206	−1.53%
Source: INSEE

== See also ==
- Communes of the Alpes-de-Haute-Provence department
