= Beauvezer =

- Commune
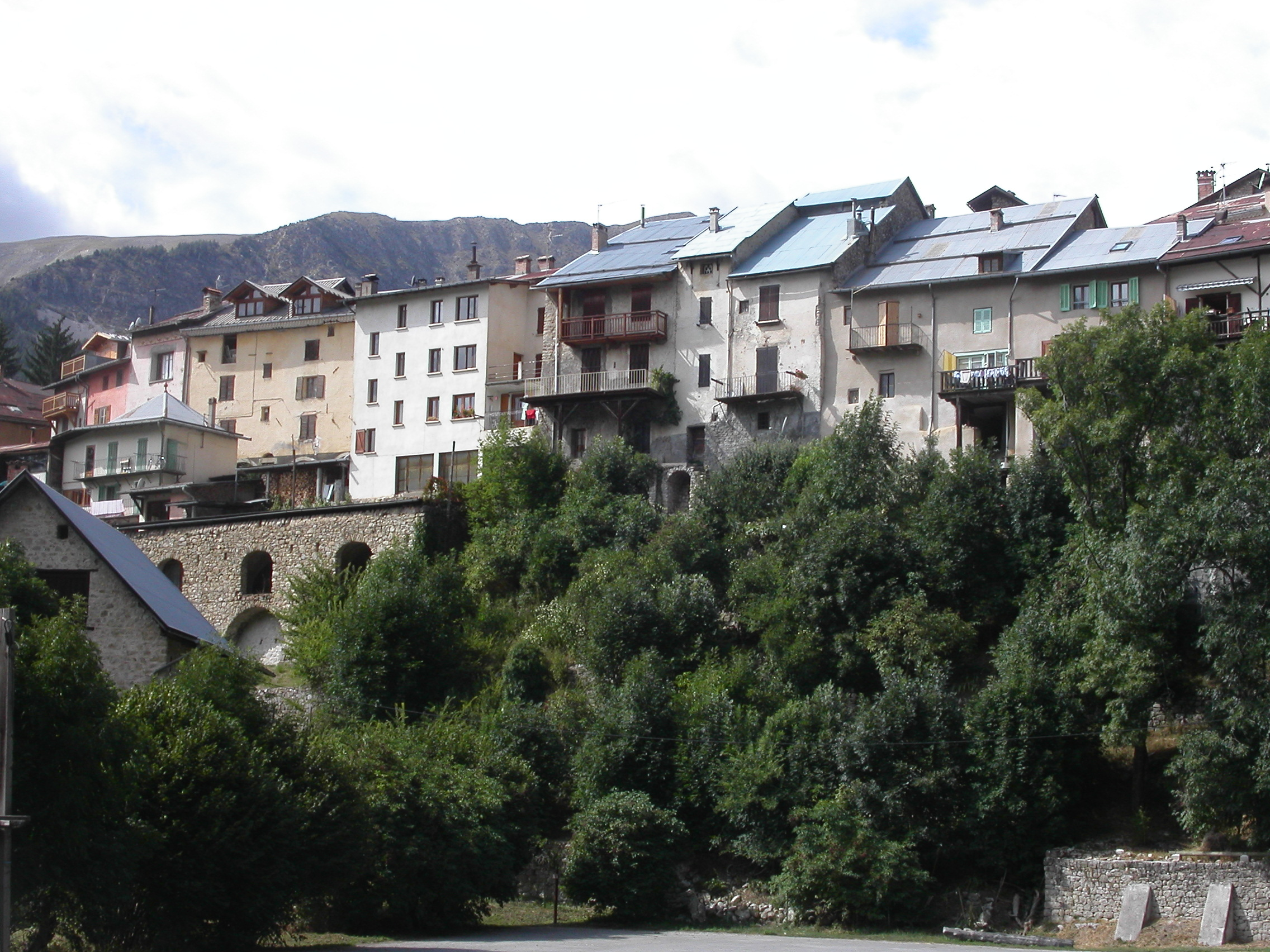
- Buildings in Beauvezer

- Coat of arms
- Location of Beauvezer
- Location within France Location within Provence-Alpes-Côte d'Azur
- Coordinates: 44°08′40″N 6°35′32″E
- Country: France
- Region: Provence-Alpes-Côte d'Azur
- Department: Alpes-de-Haute-Provence
- Arrondissement: Castellane
- Canton: Castellane

Government
  - Mayor (2026–32): Gilles Bartolini
- Area^{1}: 26.98 km^{2} (10.42 sq mi)
- Elevation: 1,150 m (3,770 ft)
- Highest elevation: 2,490 m (8,170 ft)
- Lowest elevation: 1,120 m (3,670 ft)
- Population (2023): 384
  - Density: 14.2/km^{2} (36.9/sq mi)
- Time zone: UTC+01:00 (CET)
  - Summer (DST): UTC+02:00 (CEST)
- INSEE/Postal code: 04025 /04370
- ^{1} French Land Register data, which excludes lakes, ponds, glaciers > 1 km^{2} (0.386 sq mi or 247 acres) and river estuaries.

Beauvezer (French pronunciation: [bovəze]; Occitan: Bèuvéser) is a commune in the Alpes-de-Haute-Provence department in southeastern France.

== Population ==
Historical population
| Year | Pop. | ±% p.a. |
|---|---|---|
| 1968 | 215 | — |
| 1975 | 211 | −0.27% |
| 1982 | 222 | +0.73% |
| 1990 | 226 | +0.22% |
| 1999 | 278 | +2.33% |
| 2007 | 352 | +2.99% |
| 2012 | 343 | −0.52% |
| 2017 | 377 | +1.91% |
| 2023 | 384 | +0.31% |
Source: INSEE

== See also ==
- Communes of the Alpes-de-Haute-Provence department
