= La Mure-Argens =

- Commune
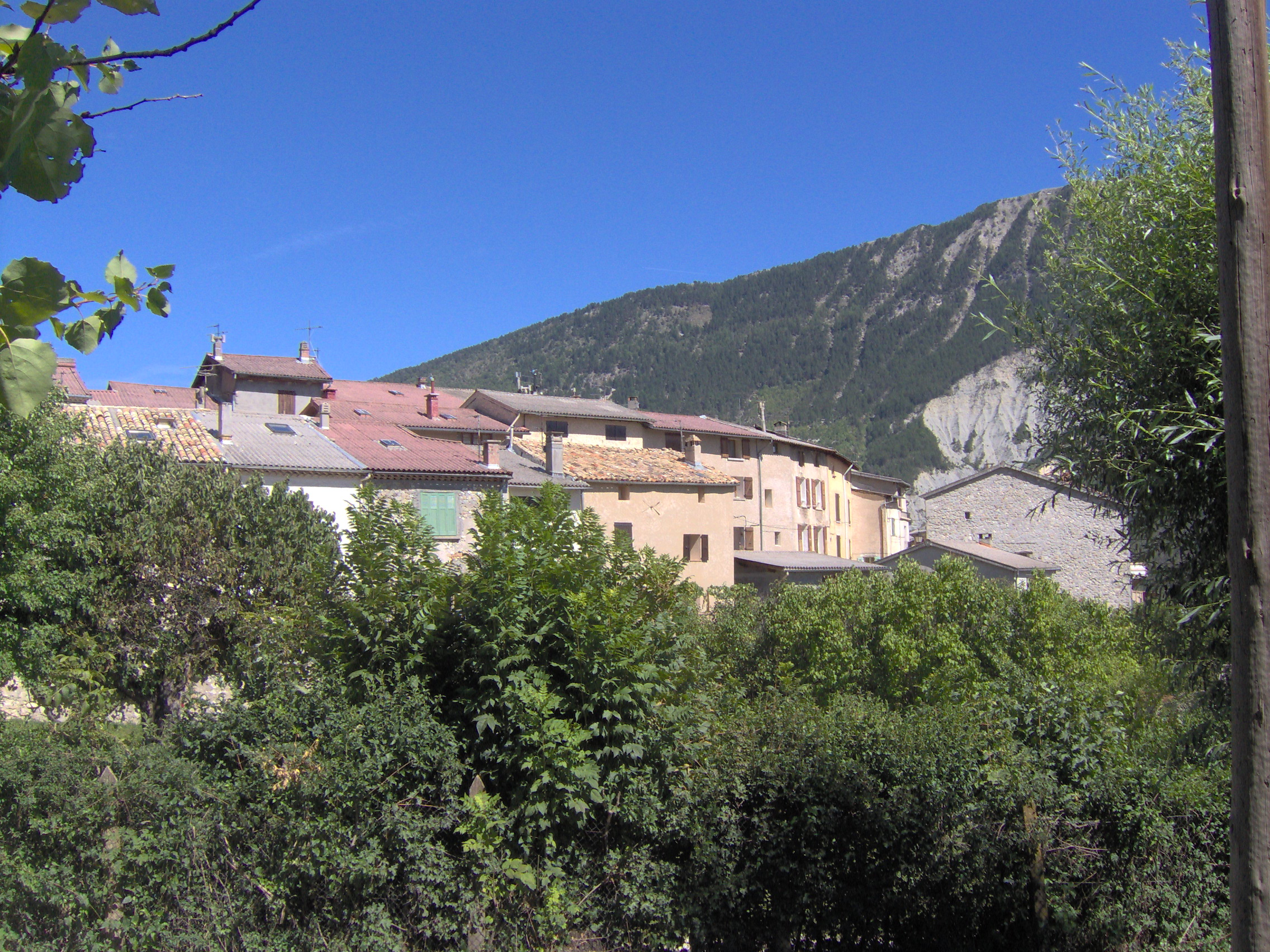
- A general view of the village of La Mure-Argens

- Coat of arms
- Location of La Mure-Argens
- Location within France Location within Provence-Alpes-Côte d'Azur
- Coordinates: 43°58′50″N 6°31′17″E
- Country: France
- Region: Provence-Alpes-Côte d'Azur
- Department: Alpes-de-Haute-Provence
- Arrondissement: Castellane
- Canton: Castellane
- Intercommunality: Alpes Provence Verdon - Sources de Lumière

Government
  - Mayor (2026–32): André Luc Blanc
- Area^{1}: 34.73 km^{2} (13.41 sq mi)
- Elevation: 918 m (3,012 ft)
- Highest elevation: 2,120 m (6,960 ft)
- Lowest elevation: 890 m (2,920 ft)
- Population (2023): 345
  - Density: 9.93/km^{2} (25.7/sq mi)
- Time zone: UTC+01:00 (CET)
  - Summer (DST): UTC+02:00 (CEST)
- INSEE/Postal code: 04136 /04170
- ^{1} French Land Register data, which excludes lakes, ponds, glaciers > 1 km^{2} (0.386 sq mi or 247 acres) and river estuaries.

La Mure-Argens (Occitan: La Mòra Argens) is a commune in the Alpes-de-Haute-Provence department in southeastern France. It was created in 1974 by the merger of two former communes: La Mure and Argens.

== Population ==
Historical population
Year	Pop.	±% p.a.
1968	161	—
1975	172	+0.95%
1982	209	+2.82%
1990	233	+1.37%
1999	249	+0.74%
2007	320	+3.19%
2012	337	+1.04%
2017	325	−0.72%
2023	345	+1.00%
Source: INSEE

== See also ==
- Communes of the Alpes-de-Haute-Provence department
