= Val-de-Chalvagne =

- Commune
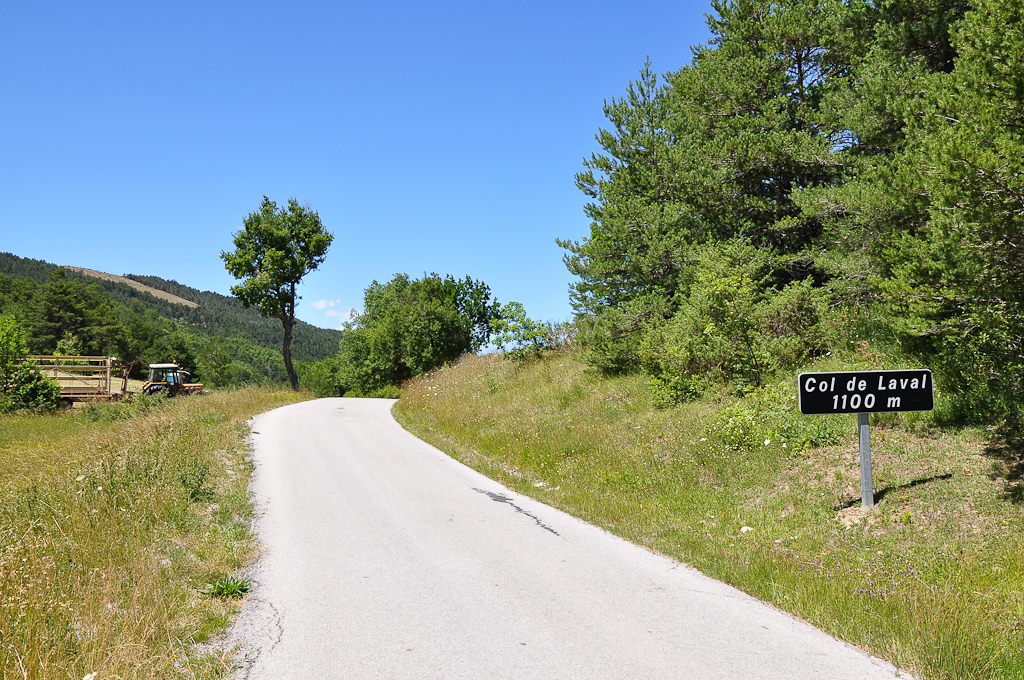
- The Col de Laval à Montblanc

- Coat of arms
- Location of Val-de-Chalvagne
- Location within France Location within Provence-Alpes-Côte d'Azur
- Coordinates: 43°54′54″N 6°48′30″E
- Country: France
- Region: Provence-Alpes-Côte d'Azur
- Department: Alpes-de-Haute-Provence
- Arrondissement: Castellane
- Canton: Castellane

Government
  - Mayor (2026–32): Joël Léon
- Area^{1}: 32.57 km^{2} (12.58 sq mi)
- Elevation: 900 m (3,000 ft)
- Highest elevation: 1,587 m (5,207 ft)
- Lowest elevation: 599 m (1,965 ft)
- Population (2023): 81
  - Density: 2.5/km^{2} (6.4/sq mi)
- Time zone: UTC+01:00 (CET)
  - Summer (DST): UTC+02:00 (CEST)
- INSEE/Postal code: 04043 /04320
- ^{1} French Land Register data, which excludes lakes, ponds, glaciers > 1 km^{2} (0.386 sq mi or 247 acres) and river estuaries.

Val-de-Chalvagne (French pronunciation: [val də ʃalvaɲ], literally Vale of Chalvagne; Occitan: Vau de Chalvanha) is a commune in the Alpes-de-Haute-Provence department in southeastern France. It was established in 1974 by the merger of the former communes Castellet-Saint-Cassien, Montblanc and Villevieille.

== Population ==
The population data given in the table and graph below for 1968 and earlier refer to the former commune of Castellet-Saint-Cassien.

Historical population

| Year | Pop. | ±% p.a. |
|---|---|---|
| 1793 | 47 | — |
| 1821 | 56 | +0.63% |
| 1831 | 139 | +9.52% |
| 1836 | 106 | −5.28% |
| 1846 | 82 | −2.53% |
| 1872 | 86 | +0.18% |
| 1901 | 81 | −0.21% |
| 1926 | 44 | −2.41% |
| 1946 | 45 | +0.11% |
| 1954 | 37 | −2.42% |

| Year | Pop. | ±% p.a. |
|---|---|---|
| 1962 | 21 | −6.84% |
| 1968 | 11 | −10.22% |
| 1975 | 52 | +24.85% |
| 1982 | 68 | +3.91% |
| 1990 | 38 | −7.02% |
| 1999 | 48 | +2.63% |
| 2007 | 63 | +3.46% |
| 2012 | 78 | +4.36% |
| 2017 | 87 | +2.21% |
| 2023 | 81 | −1.18% |

Source: EHESS and INSEE (1975-2023)

== See also ==
- Communes of the Alpes-de-Haute-Provence department
