= Méailles =

- Commune
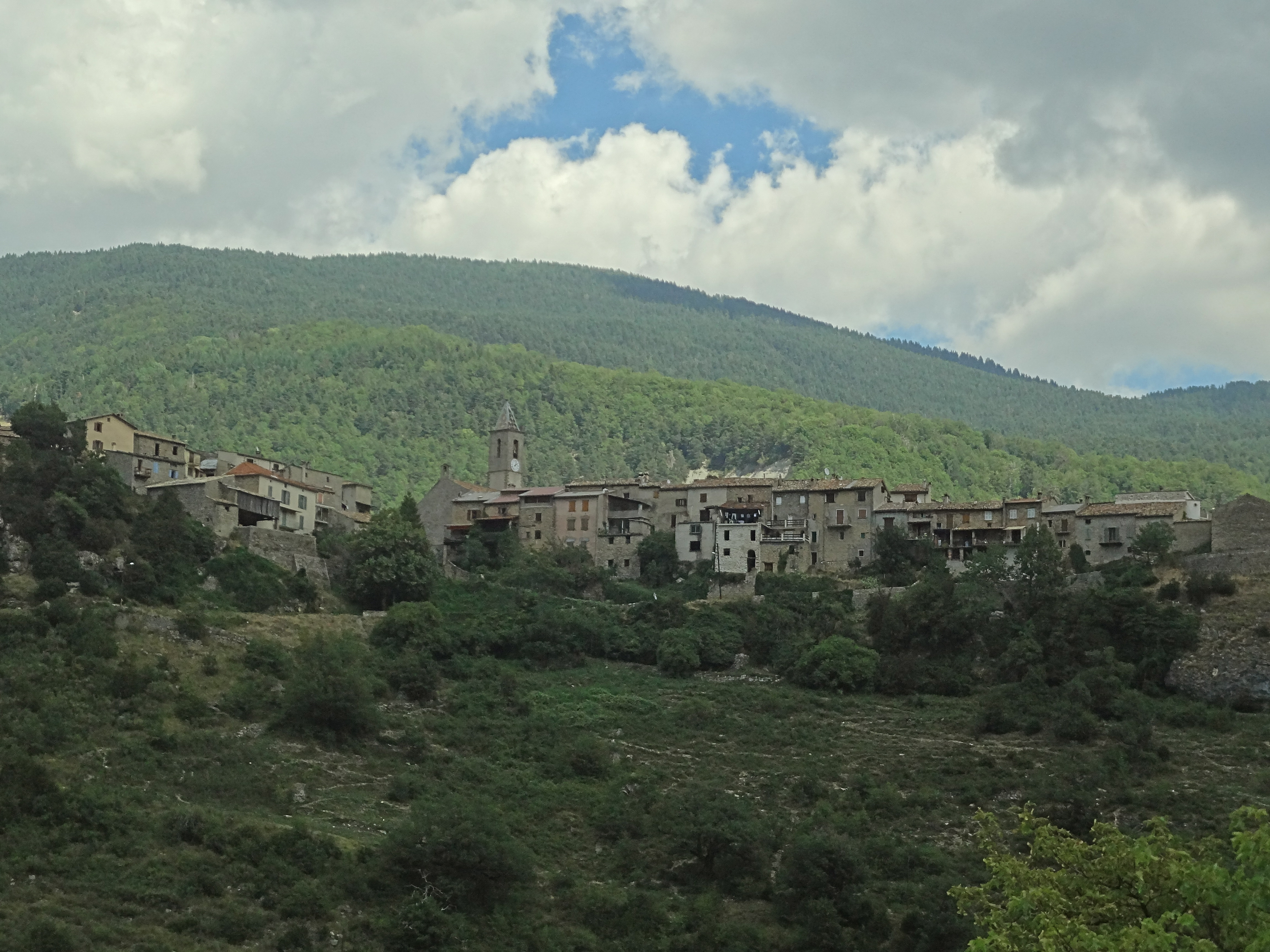
- A view of the village of Méailles

- Coat of arms
- Location of Méailles
- Location within France Location within Provence-Alpes-Côte d'Azur
- Coordinates: 44°01′27″N 6°37′56″E
- Country: France
- Region: Provence-Alpes-Côte d'Azur
- Department: Alpes-de-Haute-Provence
- Arrondissement: Castellane
- Canton: Castellane

Government
  - Mayor (2026–32): Viviane Pons-Bertaina
- Area^{1}: 32.74 km^{2} (12.64 sq mi)
- Elevation: 1,050 m (3,440 ft)
- Highest elevation: 2,183 m (7,162 ft)
- Lowest elevation: 867 m (2,844 ft)
- Population (2023): 124
  - Density: 3.79/km^{2} (9.81/sq mi)
- Time zone: UTC+01:00 (CET)
  - Summer (DST): UTC+02:00 (CEST)
- INSEE/Postal code: 04115 /04240
- ^{1} French Land Register data, which excludes lakes, ponds, glaciers > 1 km^{2} (0.386 sq mi or 247 acres) and river estuaries.

Méailles (French pronunciation: [meaj]; Occitan: Mealhas) is a commune in the Alpes-de-Haute-Provence department in southeastern France.

== Population ==
Historical population
Year	Pop.	±% p.a.
1968	153	—
1975	102	−5.63%
1982	80	−3.41%
1990	69	−1.83%
1999	87	+2.61%
2007	104	+2.26%
2012	115	+2.03%
2017	115	+0.00%
2023	124	+1.26%
Source: INSEE

== See also ==
- Communes of the Alpes-de-Haute-Provence department
