= Saint-Pierre, Alpes-de-Haute-Provence =

Saint-Pierre
- Commune
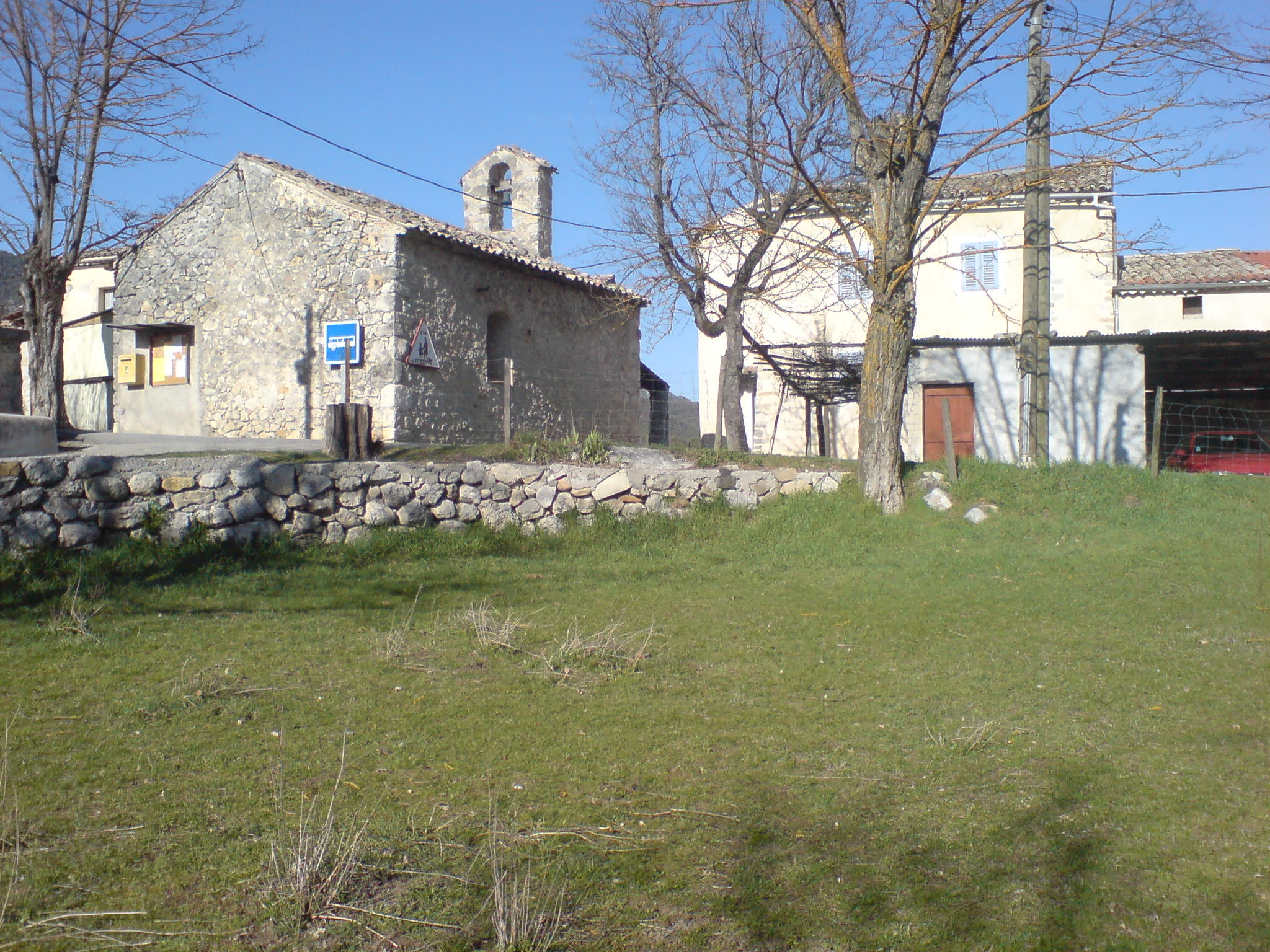
- The chapel in the village of Saint-Pierre

- Coat of arms
- Location of Saint-Pierre
- Location within France Location within Provence-Alpes-Côte d'Azur
- Coordinates: 43°54′46″N 6°55′31″E
- Country: France
- Region: Provence-Alpes-Côte d'Azur
- Department: Alpes-de-Haute-Provence
- Arrondissement: Castellane
- Canton: Castellane

Government
  - Mayor (2026–32): Sauveur Patricola
- Area^{1}: 5.62 km^{2} (2.17 sq mi)
- Elevation: 760 m (2,490 ft)
- Highest elevation: 1,199 m (3,934 ft)
- Lowest elevation: 617 m (2,024 ft)
- Population (2023): 99
  - Density: 18/km^{2} (46/sq mi)
- Time zone: UTC+01:00 (CET)
  - Summer (DST): UTC+02:00 (CEST)
- INSEE/Postal code: 04194 /06260
- ^{1} French Land Register data, which excludes lakes, ponds, glaciers > 1 km^{2} (0.386 sq mi or 247 acres) and river estuaries.

Saint-Pierre (French pronunciation: [sɛ̃ pjɛʁ]; Occitan: Sant Pèire) is a commune in the Alpes-de-Haute-Provence department in southeastern France.

== Population ==
Historical population
Year	Pop.	±% p.a.
1968	51	—
1975	37	−4.48%
1982	50	+4.40%
1990	71	+4.48%
1999	73	+0.31%
2007	107	+4.90%
2012	102	−0.95%
2017	96	−1.21%
2023	99	+0.51%
Source: INSEE

== See also ==
- Communes of the Alpes-de-Haute-Provence department
