= Castellet-lès-Sausses =

Castellet-lès-Sausses Lo Castelet de Saussas (Occitan)
- Commune
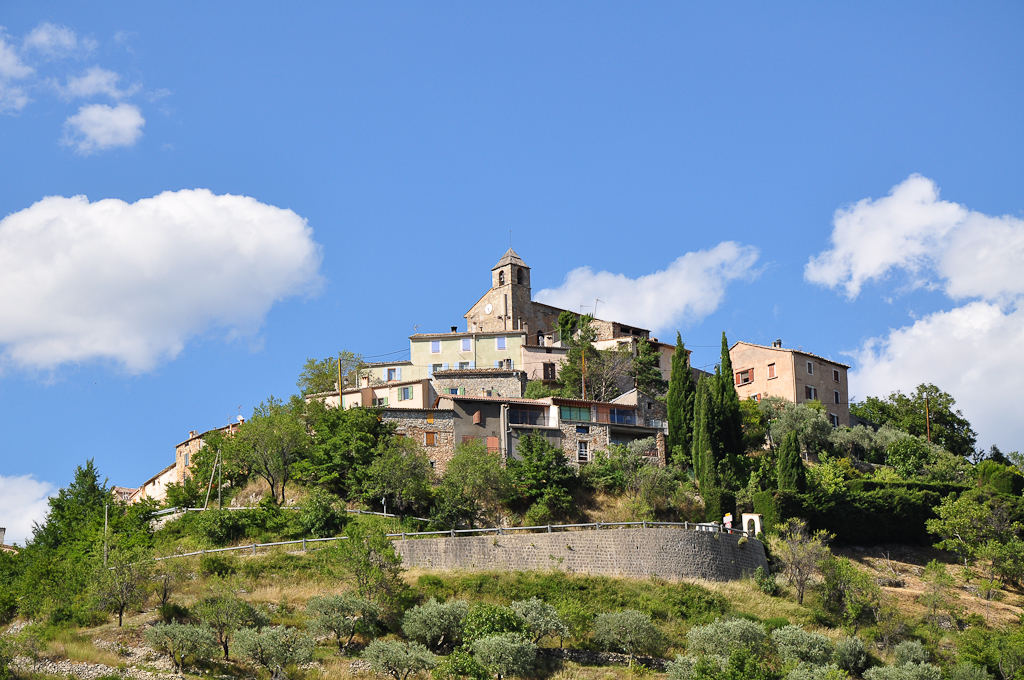
- A general view of Castellet-lès-Sausses

- Coat of arms
- Location of Castellet-lès-Sausses
- Location within France Location within Provence-Alpes-Côte d'Azur
- Coordinates: 43°59′42″N 6°45′50″E
- Country: France
- Region: Provence-Alpes-Côte d'Azur
- Department: Alpes-de-Haute-Provence
- Arrondissement: Castellane
- Canton: Castellane
- Intercommunality: CC Alpes Provence Verdon – Sources de Lumière

Government
  - Mayor (2026–32): Claude Camilleri
- Area^{1}: 53.91 km^{2} (20.81 sq mi)
- Elevation: 800 m (2,600 ft)
- Highest elevation: 2,564 m (8,412 ft)
- Lowest elevation: 510 m (1,670 ft)
- Population (2023): 143
  - Density: 2.65/km^{2} (6.87/sq mi)
- Demonym: Castelains
- Time zone: UTC+01:00 (CET)
  - Summer (DST): UTC+02:00 (CEST)
- INSEE/Postal code: 04042 /04320
- ^{1} French Land Register data, which excludes lakes, ponds, glaciers > 1 km^{2} (0.386 sq mi or 247 acres) and river estuaries.

Castellet-lès-Sausses (French pronunciation: [kastəlɛ lɛ sos]; Occitan: Lo Castelet de Saussas) is a rural commune in the Alpes-de-Haute-Provence department in Southeastern France. It is on the border with Alpes-Maritimes, on the Var River.

== Population ==
Historical population
| Year | Pop. | ±% p.a. |
|---|---|---|
| 1968 | 134 | — |
| 1975 | 104 | −3.56% |
| 1982 | 114 | +1.32% |
| 1990 | 119 | +0.54% |
| 1999 | 106 | −1.28% |
| 2007 | 112 | +0.69% |
| 2012 | 124 | +2.06% |
| 2017 | 137 | +2.01% |
| 2023 | 143 | +0.72% |
Source: INSEE

== See also ==
- Communes of the Alpes-de-Haute-Provence department
