= Le Fugeret =

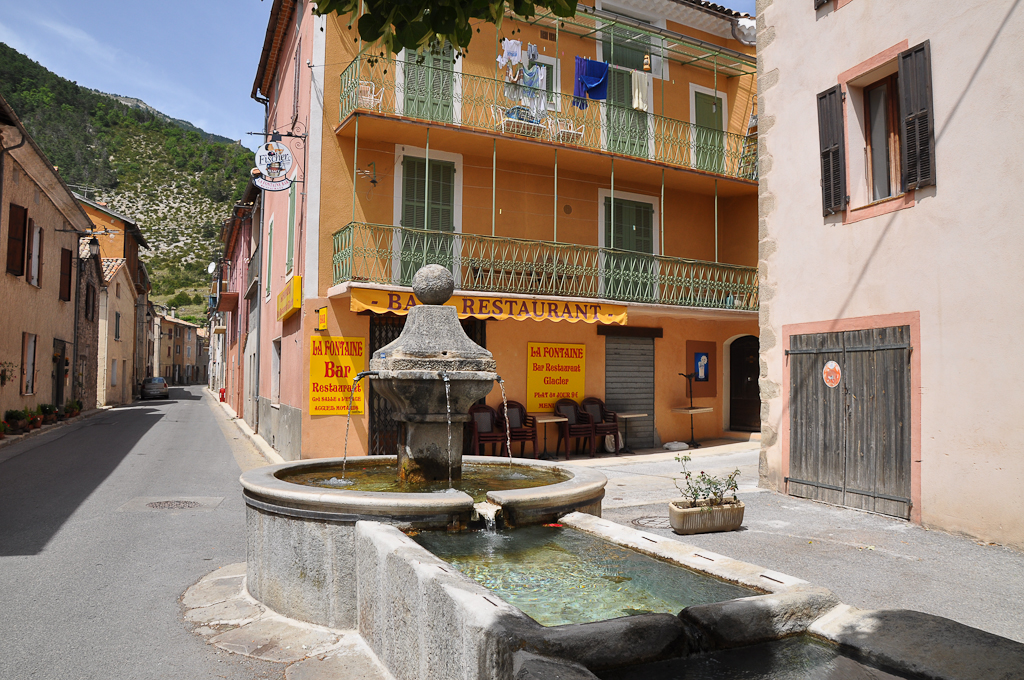
- The fountain in Le Fugeret

- Coat of arms
- Location of Le Fugeret
- Location within France Location within Provence-Alpes-Côte d'Azur
- Coordinates: 44°00′16″N 6°38′33″E
- Country: France
- Region: Provence-Alpes-Côte d'Azur
- Department: Alpes-de-Haute-Provence
- Arrondissement: Castellane
- Canton: Castellane

Government
  - Mayor (2026–32): Jean Pellegrin
- Area^{1}: 28.38 km^{2} (10.96 sq mi)
- Elevation: 835 m (2,740 ft)
- Highest elevation: 1,960 m (6,430 ft)
- Lowest elevation: 760 m (2,490 ft)
- Population (2023): 196
  - Density: 6.91/km^{2} (17.9/sq mi)
- Time zone: UTC+01:00 (CET)
  - Summer (DST): UTC+02:00 (CEST)
- INSEE/Postal code: 04090 /04240
- ^{1} French Land Register data, which excludes lakes, ponds, glaciers > 1 km^{2} (0.386 sq mi or 247 acres) and river estuaries.

Le Fugeret (French pronunciation: [lə fyʒʁɛ]; Occitan: Lo Fugeiret) is a commune in the Alpes-de-Haute-Provence department in southeastern France.

== Population ==
Historical population
Year	Pop.	±% p.a.
1968	156	—
1975	174	+1.57%
1982	168	−0.50%
1990	163	−0.38%
1999	168	+0.34%
2007	218	+3.31%
2012	205	−1.22%
2017	200	−0.49%
2023	196	−0.34%
Source: INSEE

== See also ==
- Communes of the Alpes-de-Haute-Provence department
