= Saint-André-les-Alpes =

- Commune
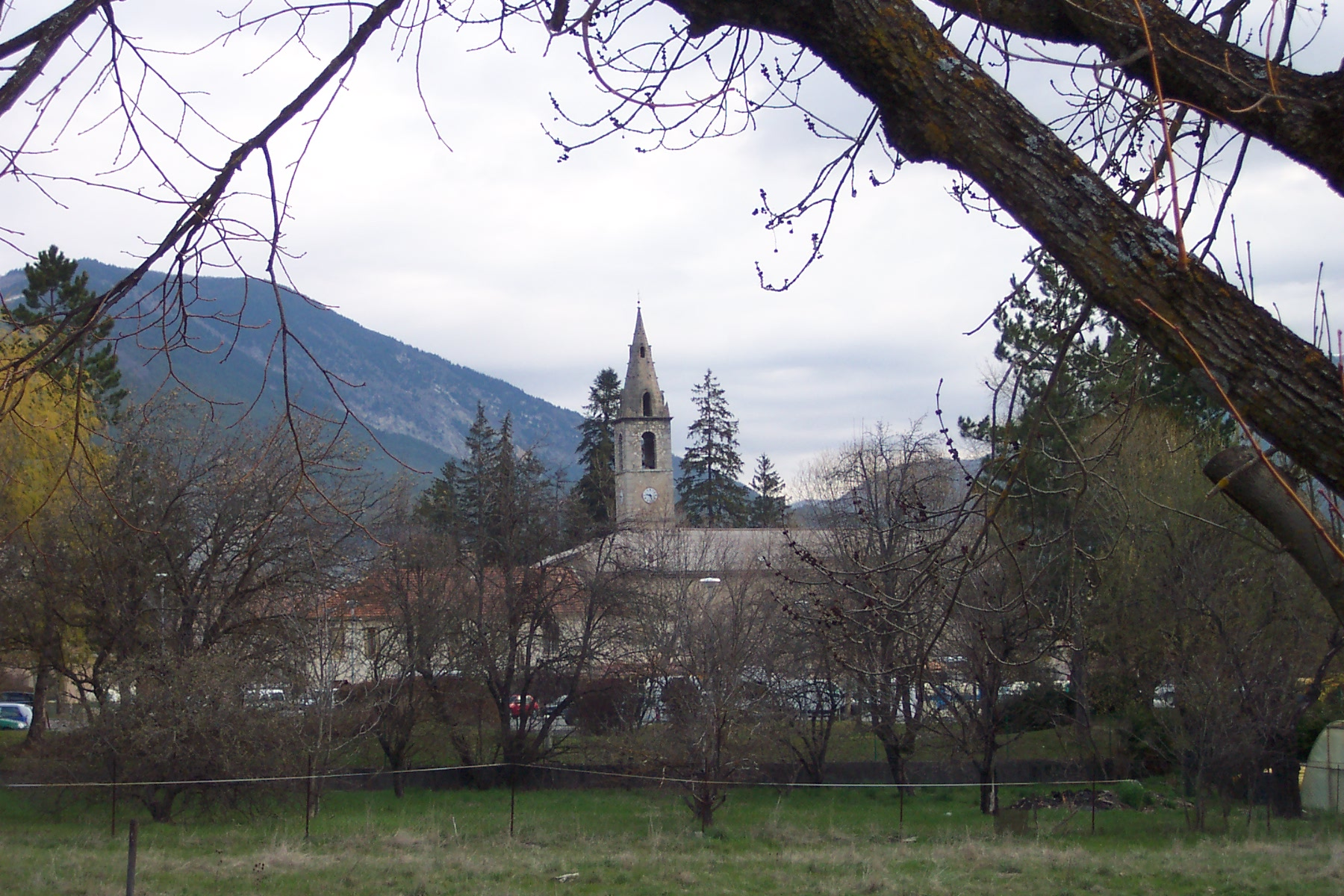
- The bell tower of the church in Saint-André-les-Alpes

- Coat of arms
- Location of Saint-André-les-Alpes
- Location within France Location within Provence-Alpes-Côte d'Azur
- Coordinates: 43°58′08″N 6°30′30″E
- Country: France
- Region: Provence-Alpes-Côte d'Azur
- Department: Alpes-de-Haute-Provence
- Arrondissement: Castellane
- Canton: Castellane
- Intercommunality: Alpes Provence Verdon-Sources de Lumière

Government
  - Mayor (2026–32): David Cerato
- Area^{1}: 47.46 km^{2} (18.32 sq mi)
- Highest elevation: 1,784 m (5,853 ft)
- Population (2023): 1,029
  - Density: 21.68/km^{2} (56.15/sq mi)
- Time zone: UTC+01:00 (CET)
  - Summer (DST): UTC+02:00 (CEST)
- INSEE/Postal code: 04173 /04170
- ^{1} French Land Register data, which excludes lakes, ponds, glaciers > 1 km^{2} (0.386 sq mi or 247 acres) and river estuaries.

Saint-André-les-Alpes (French pronunciation: [sɛ̃.t‿ɑ̃dʁe le.z‿alp]; Occitan: Sant Andrieu) is a commune in the Alpes-de-Haute-Provence department in southeastern France.

== Population ==
Historical population
Year	Pop.	±% p.a.
1968	952	—
1975	901	−0.78%
1982	852	−0.80%
1990	794	−0.88%
1999	818	+0.33%
2007	924	+1.53%
2012	925	+0.02%
2017	1,008	+1.73%
2023	1,029	+0.34%
Source: INSEE

== See also ==
- Communes of the Alpes-de-Haute-Provence department
