= Saint-Benoît, Alpes-de-Haute-Provence =

Saint-Benoît
- Commune
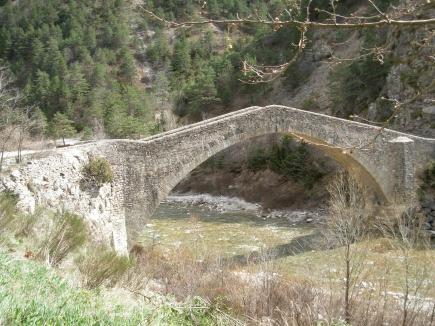
- Bridge of Queen Jeanne over the Coulomp

- Coat of arms
- Location of Saint-Benoît
- Location within France Location within Provence-Alpes-Côte d'Azur
- Coordinates: 43°58′05″N 6°43′35″E
- Country: France
- Region: Provence-Alpes-Côte d'Azur
- Department: Alpes-de-Haute-Provence
- Arrondissement: Castellane
- Canton: Castellane

Government
  - Mayor (2026–32): Gaël Eyssautier
- Area^{1}: 21.03 km^{2} (8.12 sq mi)
- Elevation: 720 m (2,360 ft)
- Highest elevation: 1,402 m (4,600 ft)
- Lowest elevation: 515 m (1,690 ft)
- Population (2023): 166
  - Density: 7.89/km^{2} (20.4/sq mi)
- Time zone: UTC+01:00 (CET)
  - Summer (DST): UTC+02:00 (CEST)
- INSEE/Postal code: 04174 /04240
- ^{1} French Land Register data, which excludes lakes, ponds, glaciers > 1 km^{2} (0.386 sq mi or 247 acres) and river estuaries.

Saint-Benoît (French pronunciation: [sɛ̃ bənwa]; Occitan: Sant Beneset) is a commune in the Alpes-de-Haute-Provence department in southeastern France.

== Population ==
Historical population
Year	Pop.	±% p.a.
1968	71	—
1975	54	−3.83%
1982	66	+2.91%
1990	85	+3.21%
1999	112	+3.11%
2007	125	+1.38%
2012	132	+1.10%
2017	149	+2.45%
2023	166	+1.82%
Source: INSEE

== See also ==
- Communes of the Alpes-de-Haute-Provence department
