= Canton of Castellane =

Coordinates: 43°50′51″N 6°30′50″E

Castellane
- Canton
- Interactive map of Castellane
- Country: France
- Region: Provence-Alpes-Côte d'Azur
- Department: Alpes-de-Haute-Provence
- No. of communes: {{{nbcomm}}}

Government
  - Representatives (2022–2028): Magali Girieud; Alain Delsaux
- Area: 1,320.43 km^{2} (509.82 sq mi)
- Population (2023): 9,892
  - Density: 7.491/km^{2} (19.40/sq mi)
- INSEE code: 04 02

The canton of Castellane is an administrative division in southeastern France. At the French canton reorganisation which came into effect in March 2015, the canton was expanded from 7 to 32 communes. Its seat is in Castellane.

== Composition ==
It consists of the following communes:

1. Allons
2. Allos
3. Angles
4. Annot
5. Beauvezer
6. Braux
7. Castellane
8. Castellet-lès-Sausses
9. Colmars
10. Demandolx
11. Entrevaux
12. Le Fugeret
13. La Garde
14. Lambruisse
15. Méailles
16. Moriez
17. La Mure-Argens
18. Peyroules
19. La Rochette
20. Rougon
21. Saint-André-les-Alpes
22. Saint-Benoît
23. Saint-Julien-du-Verdon
24. Saint-Pierre
25. Sausses
26. Soleilhas
27. Thorame-Basse
28. Thorame-Haute
29. Ubraye
30. Val-de-Chalvagne
31. Vergons
32. Villars-Colmars

== Councillors ==
Election	Councillors	Party	Occupation
2015	Alberte Vallée	PS	Councillor of Allos
2015	Gilbert Sauvan	PS	President of Alpes-de-Haute-Provence's Departmental council Member of the National Assembly for Alpes-de-Haute-Provence's 1st constituency
2017	Thierry Collomp	DVG	Mayor of Saint-Julien-du-Verdon

- Following the death of Gilbert Sauvan, his substitute, Thierry Collomp, replaces it.

== Pictures of the canton ==
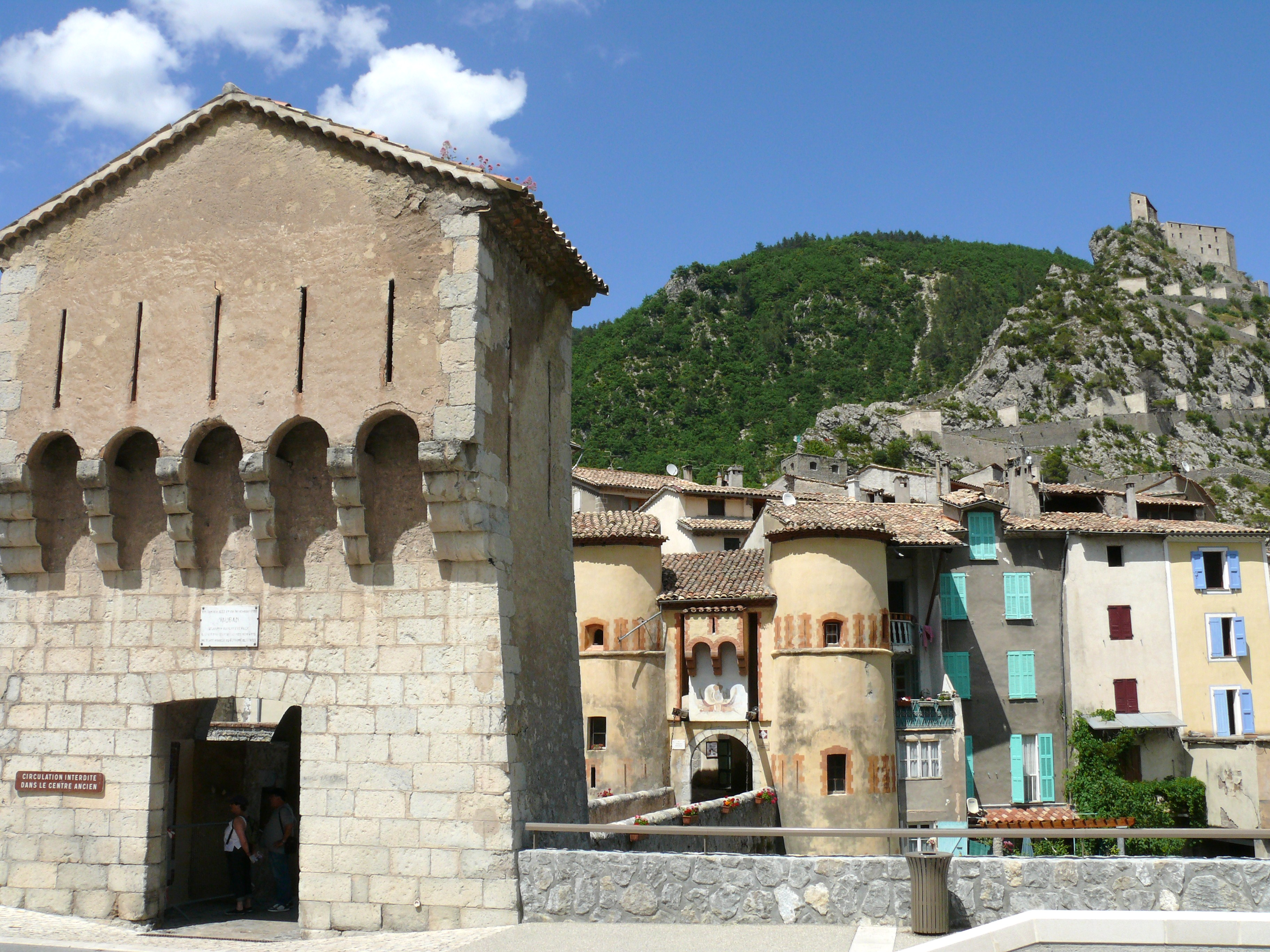
View of Entrevaux's Citadel

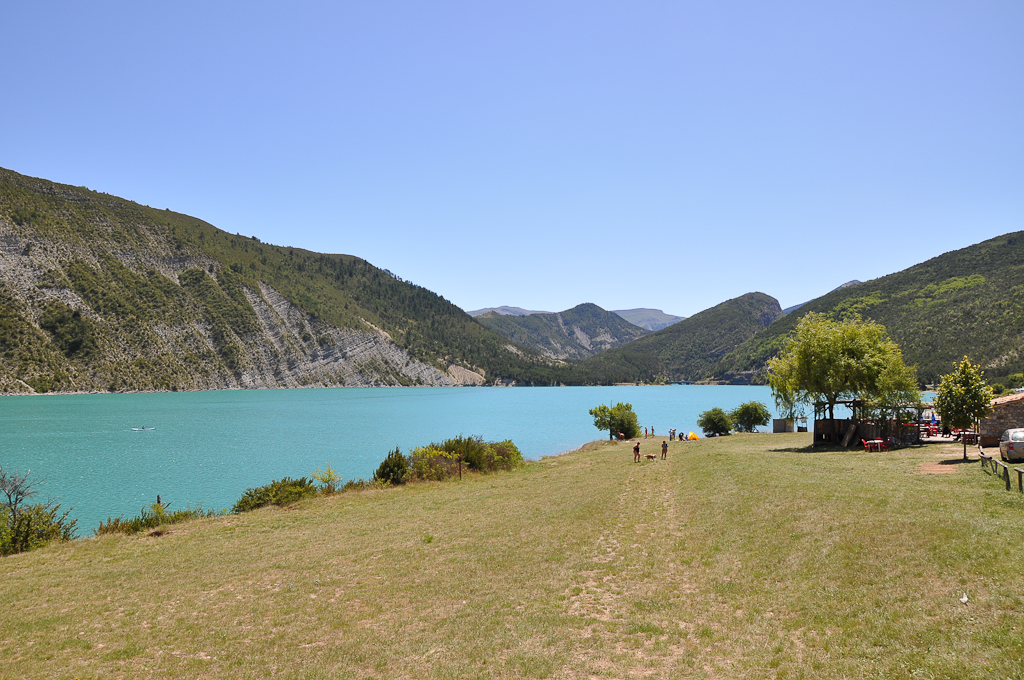
Castillon's Lake in Saint-André-les-Alpes

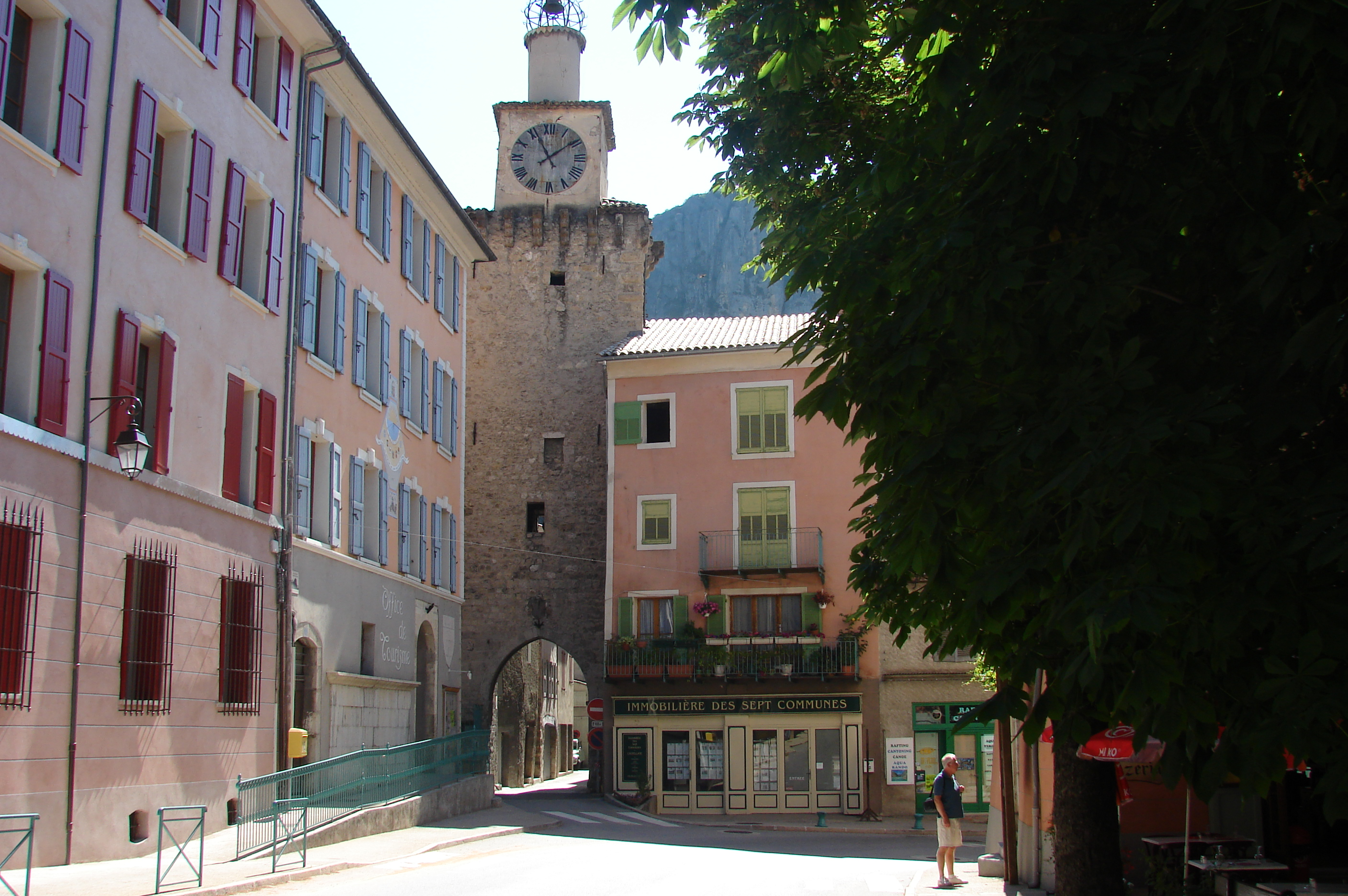
Street in Castellane

== See also ==
- Cantons of the Alpes-de-Haute-Provence department
- Communes of France
