= Canton of Banon =

Coordinates: 44°02′20″N 5°37′43″E

Banon
- Former canton
- Interactive map of Banon
- Country: France
- Region: Provence-Alpes-Côte d'Azur
- Department: Alpes-de-Haute-Provence
- No. of communes: {{{nbcomm}}}
- Disbanded: 2015
- Area: 296.32 km^{2} (114.41 sq mi)
- Population (2012): 2,989
  - Density: 10.09/km^{2} (26.13/sq mi)

The canton of Banon is a former administrative division in southeastern France. It was disbanded following the French canton reorganisation which came into effect in March 2015. It consisted of 9 communes, which joined the canton of Reillanne in 2015. It had 2,989 inhabitants (2012).

The canton comprised the following communes:

- Banon
- L'Hospitalet
- Montsalier
- Redortiers
- Revest-des-Brousses
- Revest-du-Bion
- La Rochegiron
- Saumane
- Simiane-la-Rotonde

== Demographics ==
Historical population Canton of Banon
Year	1962	1968	1975	1982	1990	1999
Pop.	1,895	2,248	2,143	2,393	2,413	2,486
±%	—	+18.6%	−4.7%	+11.7%	+0.8%	+3.0%
From the year 1962 on: No double counting – residents of multiple communes (e.g. students and military personnel) are counted only once. Source: INSEE

== See also ==
- Cantons of the Alpes-de-Haute-Provence department
