= Géologique du Luberon National Nature Reserve =

Regional nature reserve and fossil site in Provence-Alpes-Côte d'Azur, France

Luberon Geological National Nature Reserve
- IUCN category III (natural monument or feature)
- Interactive map of Luberon Geological National Nature Reserve
- Location: Alpes-de-Haute-Provence and Vaucluse, France
- Nearest city: Cavaillon
- Coordinates: 43°50′15″N 05°35′30″E
- Area: 312 ha (770 acres)
- Established: 16 September 1987
- Governing body: Luberon regional natural park

Luberon Geologic Formation
- Stratigraphic range: Eocene–Pliocene
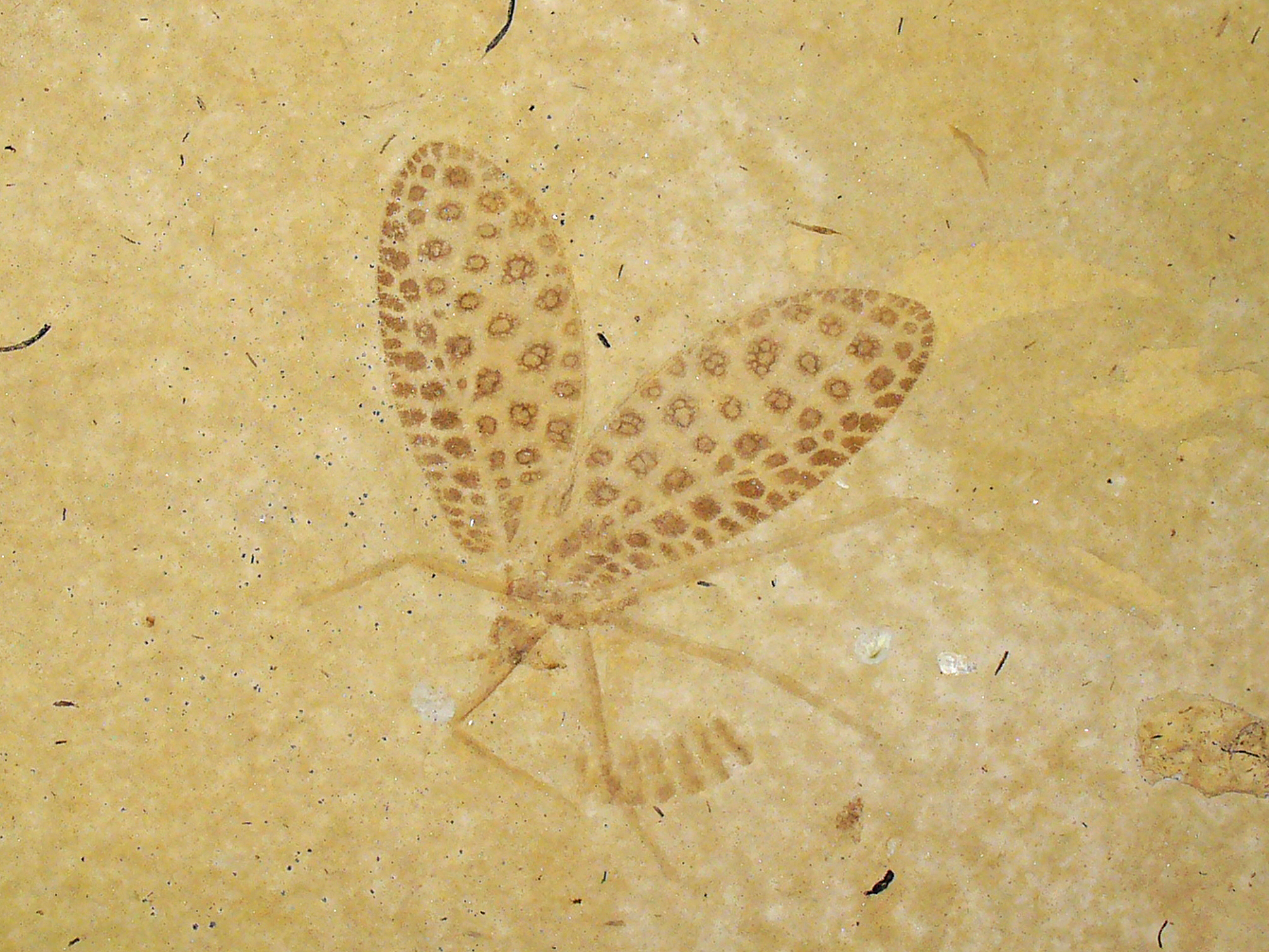
- Archepseudophylla laurenti found in Céreste
- Type: Various fossil sites

Location
- Region: Bourgogne-Franche-Comté
- Country: France

Type section
- Named for: Luberon
- Géologique du Luberon National Nature Reserve (France)

The Luberon Geological National Nature Reserve (RNN90) is a national nature reserve located in Provence-Alpes-Côte d'Azur. Established in 1987, it occupies 312 hectares (770 acres) (Note: The Inventaire national du patrimoine naturel (INPN) states 312.1654 hectares as the "official" area; or, if calculated by GIS, 340 ha (840 acres)) and protects 28 scattered geological sites dated from the Cenozoic.

== Administration and legal status ==
The nature reserve was established under a decree of the 16 September 1987.

It was established in order to protect 28 geological sites from the Cenozoic era, divided in 4 categories: sites with fossils of vertebrates, insects and plants from the Oligocene, slabs bearing the tracks of mammals from the Oligocene, sites with vertebrates from the Eocene and Miocene, sites with invertebrates from the Miocene and Pliocene.

The nature reserve is administered by the Parc naturel régional du Luberon.

== Location and sites ==
The domain of the nature reserve spreads over the Alpes-de-Haute-Provence and Vaucluse departments. It covers roughly 300 ha (740 acres) over 20 communes:

- Alpes-de-Haute-Provence : Aubenas-les-Alpes, Céreste, Montfuron, Montjustin, Oppedette, Reillanne, Revest-des-Brousses, Saint-Maime, Vachères et Villeneuve.
- Vaucluse : Bonnieux, Cabrières-d'Aigues, Caseneuve, Cheval-Blanc, Cucuron, Murs, Saignon, Saint-Martin-de-Castillon, Saint-Saturnin-lès-Apt, Viens.

A protected zone of 70,000 hectares (170,000 acres) was placed around those sites by order of the prefect.

=== Aubenas-les-Alpes ===
The village of Aubenas-les-Alpes was built over an hill of red marl dating from the Oligocene. It contains the bones of large mammals and reptiles (such as crocodiles and turtles). In the vallon de l'Aiguebelle (an ever-flowing stream, even during the dryest droughts), fossils of plants and fishes (Dapalis macrurus) have been uncovered. Both those deposits are classified geological reserves (inside the Luberon Geological National Nature Reserve), and any collection is forbidden. Information panels are placed near the sites. A selection of the unearthed fossils can be seen in the Musée de Vachères, at the Maison du Parc Naturel Régional du Luberon, at Apt in Vaucluse, and at the National Museum of Natural History in Paris.

=== Céreste ===
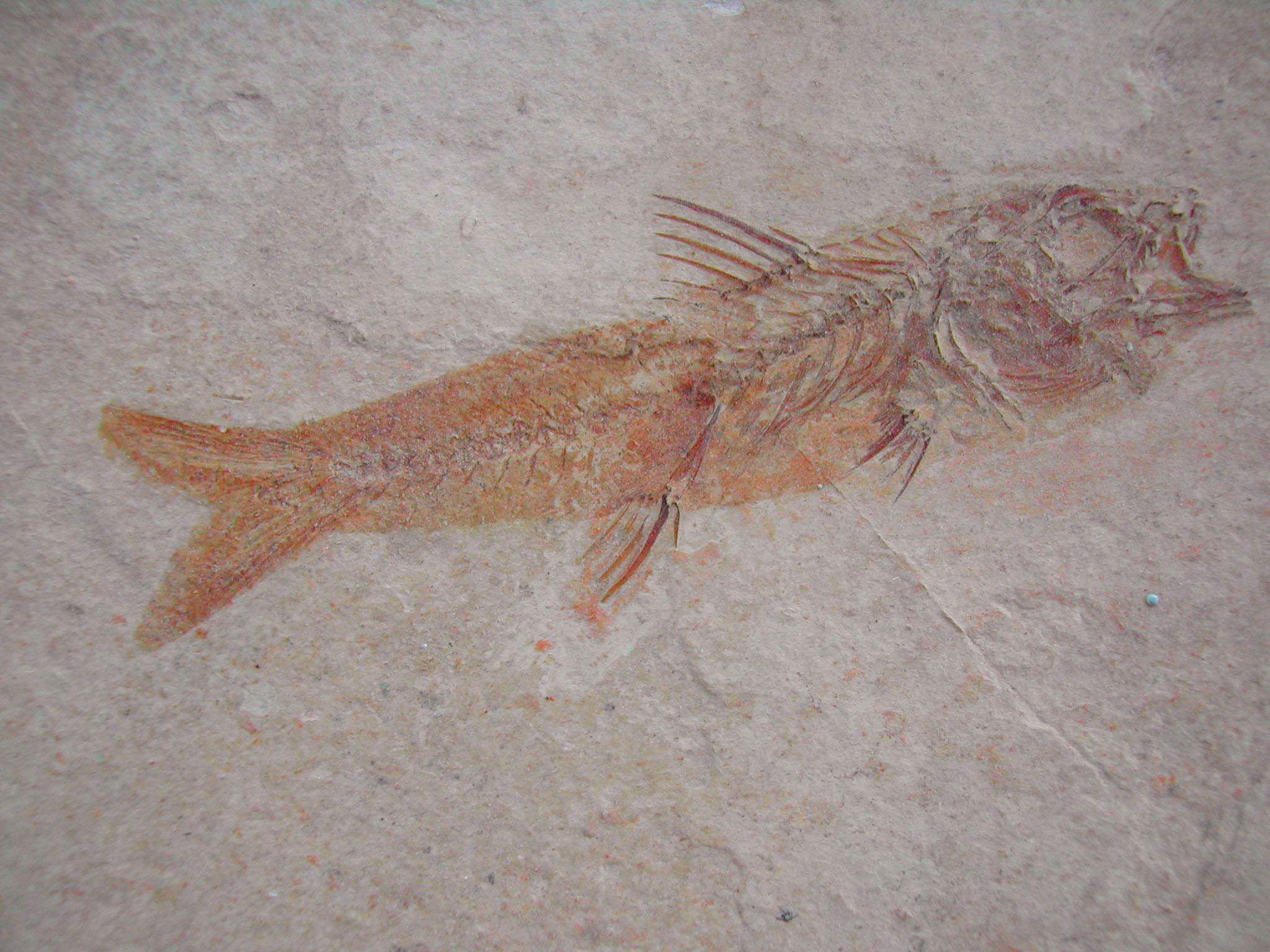
Fossil of Dapalis from Céreste.

50 millions of years ago, at the beginning of the Eocene, the Apt and Céreste basins were covered by a vast inner lake. A tropical climate had created a rich fauna and flora, fossilized in thin plates of schistous limestone up to the Oligocene. Those various fossils correspond to a riverine flora and fishes, molluscs and insects.

Easy access to the fossil sites allowed their pillage, to the degree that their removal appeared almost organized. The actions of the Parc naturel régional du Luberon allowed the fossils at the site to diminish by 95%. The commune of Céreste is today inside the perimeter of the Luberon Geological National Nature Reserve, due to the proximity with exceptional fossil sites.

=== Reillanne ===
During the 1950s, numerous fossil tracks were identified in Reillanne and around the Pas d'Ânes locality. Traditionally considered to be donkey tracks, it was discovered that the footprints were made by Anchitherium, an extinct genus of Equidae who lived roughly 20 millions of years ago.

=== Murs, Vaucluse ===
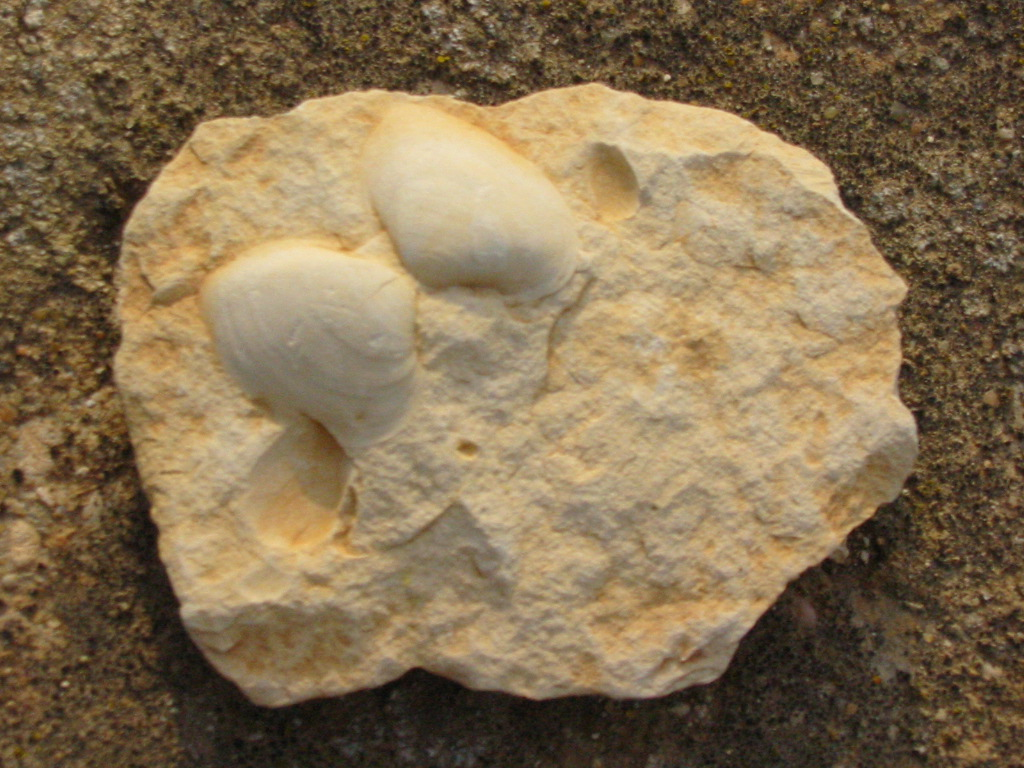
Fossil of bivalve : 20 millions of years ago, a sea covered what is today Provence.

The commune of Murs contains a locality known as Le Puy, part of the Luberon Geological National Nature Reserve. This zone is protected and digging and collecting are strictly forbidden by law. It bears marl limestones of continental facies from the Cenozoic era (Rupelian). It has provided fossils of fishes, and of the leaves and cuticles of plants.

=== Saignon ===
Located at Le Carlet, to the southeast of Saignon's train station, is the Négri quarry. In 1981, an examination of the quarry's surface limestone layer revealed preserved fossil tracks. Thousands of tracks can be seen across the surface of what was a marshy soil dating back from the Oligocene. Traces of Palaeotherium magnum, Anchilophus radegondensis, Anoplotherium commune and A. latipes, Xiphodon gracile, Pterodon spp. and Hyanodon spp. were identified, as well as unique forms and tracks of large birds.

=== Viens ===
At Viens, Vaucluse, Dalle de Viens ('slabs of Viens') contain fossilized tracksites of Oligocene mammals.
