= Saint-Michel-l'Observatoire =

- Commune
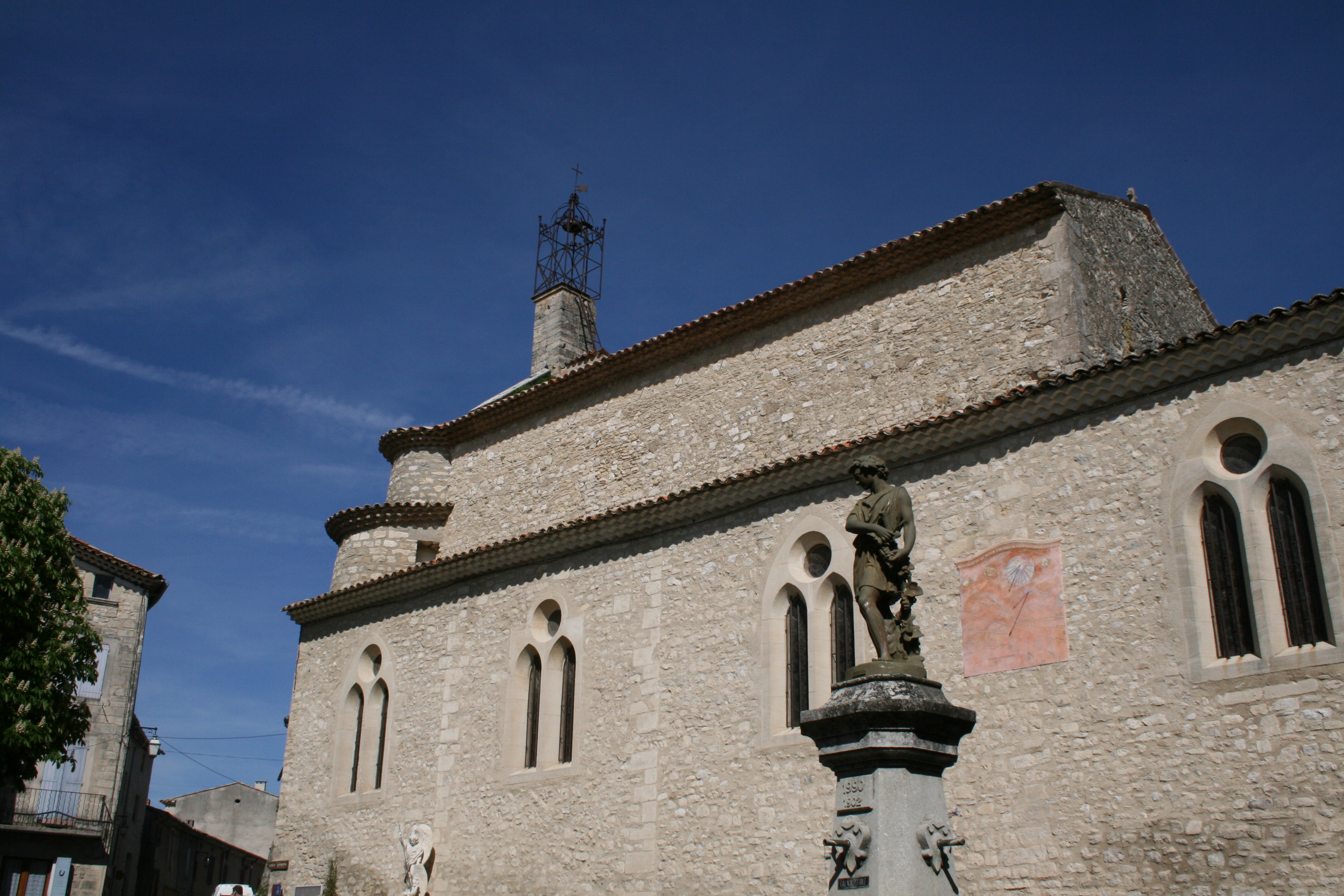
- Church of Saint-Pierre

- Coat of arms
- Location of Saint-Michel-l'Observatoire
- Location within France Location within Provence-Alpes-Côte d'Azur
- Coordinates: 43°54′38″N 5°43′00″E
- Country: France
- Region: Provence-Alpes-Côte d'Azur
- Department: Alpes-de-Haute-Provence
- Arrondissement: Forcalquier
- Canton: Reillanne
- Intercommunality: Haute-Provence-Pays de Banon

Government
  - Mayor (2026–32): Raymond Armanet
- Area^{1}: 27.78 km^{2} (10.73 sq mi)
- Elevation: 543 m (1,781 ft)
- Highest elevation: 767 m (2,516 ft)
- Lowest elevation: 386 m (1,266 ft)
- Population (2023): 1,329
  - Density: 47.84/km^{2} (123.9/sq mi)
- Time zone: UTC+01:00 (CET)
  - Summer (DST): UTC+02:00 (CEST)
- INSEE/Postal code: 04192 /04870
- ^{1} French Land Register data, which excludes lakes, ponds, glaciers > 1 km^{2} (0.386 sq mi or 247 acres) and river estuaries.

Saint-Michel-l'Observatoire (French pronunciation: [sɛ̃ miʃɛl lɔpsɛʁvatwaʁ]; Occitan: Sant Miquèu de l'Observatòri) is a commune in the Alpes-de-Haute-Provence department in southeastern France. It was the death place of 18th-century botanist Jean-Paul de Rome d'Ardène and Taos Amrouche, the French-speaking Algerian writer, singer of Kabyle music, and activist for women's causes.

== Population ==
Historical population
Year	Pop.	±% p.a.
1968	499	—
1975	617	+3.08%
1982	713	+2.09%
1990	844	+2.13%
1999	904	+0.77%
2007	1,089	+2.35%
2012	1,196	+1.89%
2017	1,238	+0.69%
2023	1,329	+1.19%
Source: INSEE

== Observatory ==
Saint-Michel-l'Observatoire is the "host town" of the Haute-Provence Observatory, a nationally ranked facility. It is considered, by many astronomers, to be the best European low-altitude (400 meters) observatory in operation. There is also an astronomy center for educational purposes. It hosts students of elementary schools for brief stays (1–2 weeks) during the year and organizes theme nights of combined sky observations and expositions/debates on different themes.

St. Michael was chosen as the location of the Haute-Provence Observatory site, about 600 meters north. The village is located 543m altitude. The rock Guerin rises to 767 meters in the municipality.

The neighboring towns of Saint-Michel-Observatoire are Revest des Brousses, Mane, Dauphin, Saint-Martin-les-Eaux, Villemus, Reillane and Aubenas-les-Alpes.

=== The territory of the Regional Natural Park of Luberon ===
The village is located in the Regional Natural Park of Luberon. The town is one of the seventy-seven Member States of the Regional Natural Park of the Luberon Park, which extends from Cavaillon in the west to the east Durance, two departments and eighty-five towns and 185,145 hectares. To the south, it overlooks the Luberon Durance basin and the county of Aigues.

The town has two main villages, Saint-Michel and Lincel and several hamlets including the Craux, and quite a few differences.

== International relations ==
The commune is twinned with:

- Monte Porzio Catone, Italy

== See also ==
- Luberon
- Communes of the Alpes-de-Haute-Provence department
- Video about Saint-Michel Observatory, available on Paris Observatory digital library
