= Redortiers =

- Commune
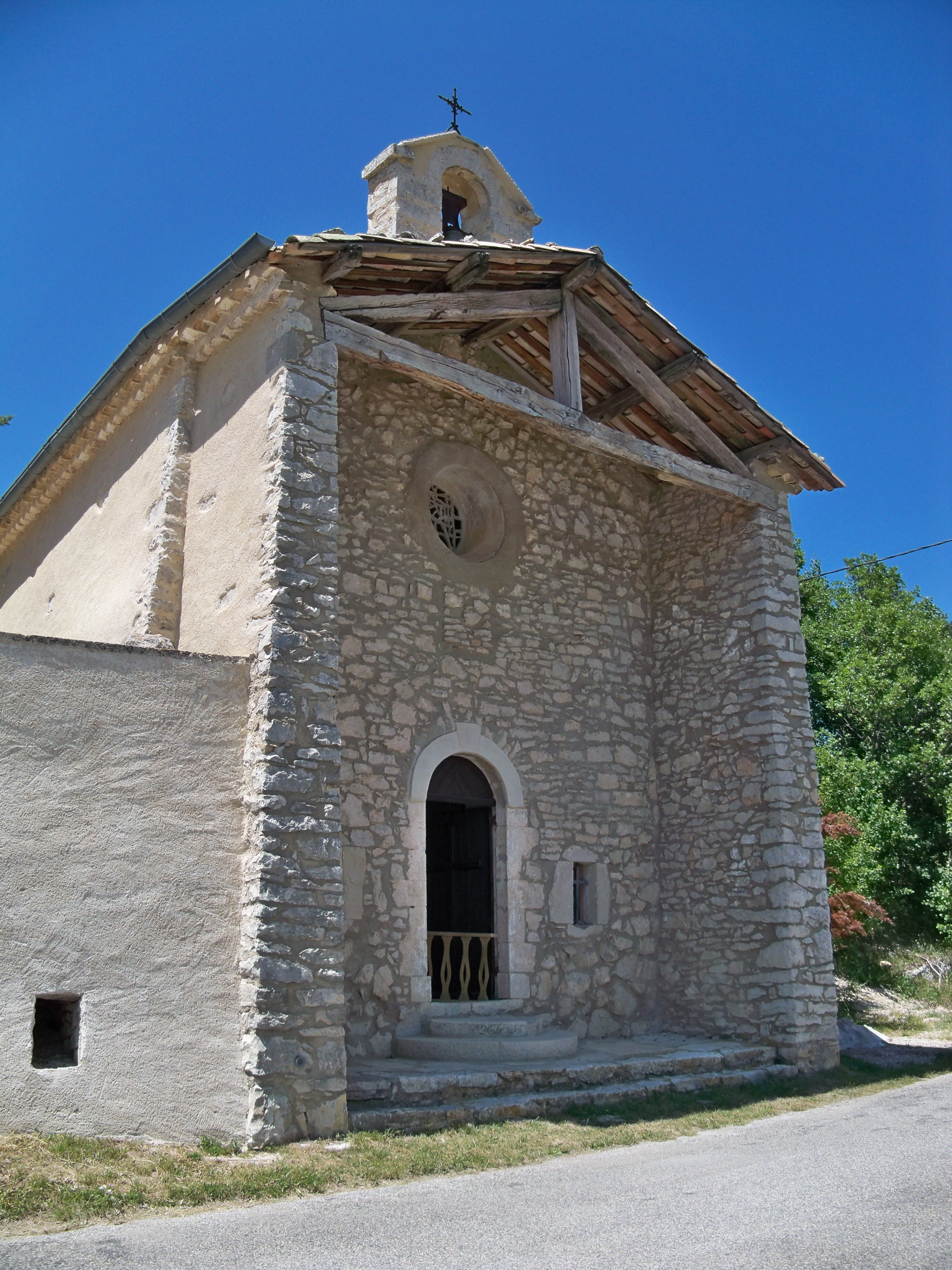
- The church of Saint-Jean-Baptiste, in Redortiers
- Location of Redortiers
- Location within France Location within Provence-Alpes-Côte d'Azur
- Coordinates: 44°06′19″N 5°37′08″E
- Country: France
- Region: Provence-Alpes-Côte d'Azur
- Department: Alpes-de-Haute-Provence
- Arrondissement: Forcalquier
- Canton: Reillanne
- Intercommunality: Haute-Provence Pays de Banon

Government
  - Mayor (2026–32): Gérard Burcheri
- Area^{1}: 45.77 km^{2} (17.67 sq mi)
- Elevation: 950 m (3,120 ft)
- Highest elevation: 1,430 m (4,690 ft)
- Lowest elevation: 810 m (2,660 ft)
- Population (2023): 88
  - Density: 1.9/km^{2} (5.0/sq mi)
- Time zone: UTC+01:00 (CET)
  - Summer (DST): UTC+02:00 (CEST)
- INSEE/Postal code: 04159 /04150
- ^{1} French Land Register data, which excludes lakes, ponds, glaciers > 1 km^{2} (0.386 sq mi or 247 acres) and river estuaries.

Redortiers (French pronunciation: [ʁədɔʁtje]) is a commune in the Alpes-de-Haute-Provence department in southeastern France.

The territory of the municipality includes the districts of Le Contadours, Les Martins and Le Poisson. The municipality borders on Les Omergues to the northwest, Montfroc to the northeast, La Rochegiron to the east, Banon to the southeast, Montsalier to the southwest and Revest-du-Bion to the west.

== Population ==
Historical population
Year	Pop.	±% p.a.
1968	101	—
1975	85	−2.43%
1982	73	−2.15%
1990	71	−0.35%
1999	68	−0.48%
2007	86	+2.98%
2012	67	−4.87%
2017	81	+3.87%
2023	88	+1.39%
Source: INSEE

== See also ==
- Communes of the Alpes-de-Haute-Provence department
