= Saumane =

Saumane is the name or part of the name of several communes in France:

- Saumane, in the Alpes-de-Haute-Provence department
- Saumane, in the Gard department
- Saumane-de-Vaucluse, in the Vaucluse department
