= Aubenas-les-Alpes =

Commune in southeastern France

- Commune
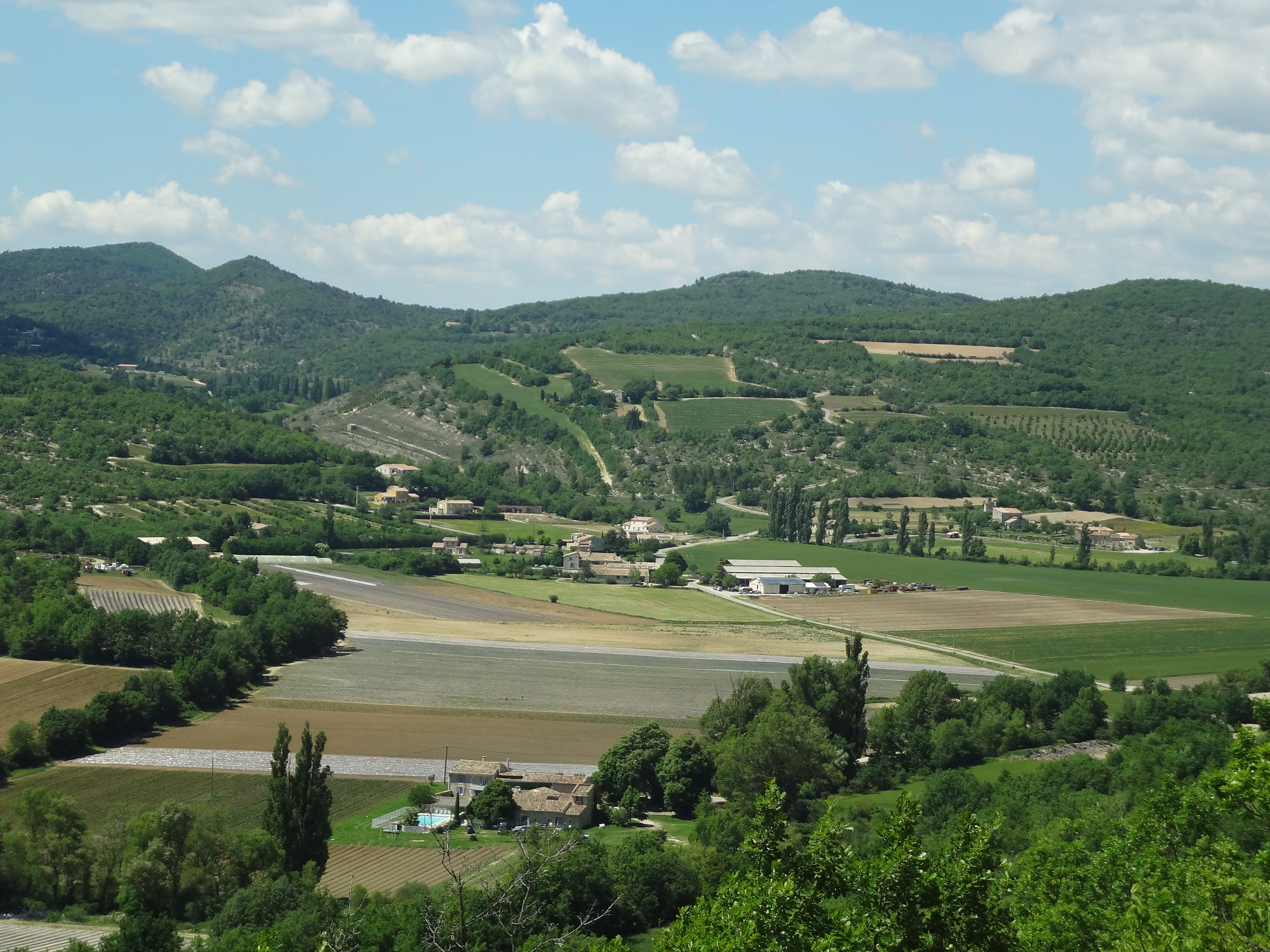
- Aubenas-les-Alpes plain

- Coat of arms
- Location of Aubenas-les-Alpes
- Location within France Location within Provence-Alpes-Côte d'Azur
- Coordinates: 43°55′56″N 5°40′52″E
- Country: France
- Region: Provence-Alpes-Côte d'Azur
- Department: Alpes-de-Haute-Provence
- Arrondissement: Forcalquier
- Canton: Reillanne
- Intercommunality: Haute-Provence Pays de Banon

Government
  - Mayor (2026–32): Dimitri Nicolopoulos-Salle
- Area^{1}: 7.93 km^{2} (3.06 sq mi)
- Elevation: 650 m (2,130 ft)
- Highest elevation: 780 m (2,560 ft)
- Lowest elevation: 480 m (1,570 ft)
- Population (2023): 90
  - Density: 11/km^{2} (29/sq mi)
- Time zone: UTC+01:00 (CET)
  - Summer (DST): UTC+02:00 (CEST)
- INSEE/Postal code: 04012 /04110
- ^{1} French Land Register data, which excludes lakes, ponds, glaciers > 1 km^{2} (0.386 sq mi or 247 acres) and river estuaries.

Aubenas-les-Alpes is a commune in the Alpes-de-Haute-Provence department in the Provence-Alpes-Côte d'Azur region of south-eastern France.

The commune has been awarded two flowers by the National Council of Towns and Villages in Bloom in the Competition of cities and villages in Bloom.

== Geography ==
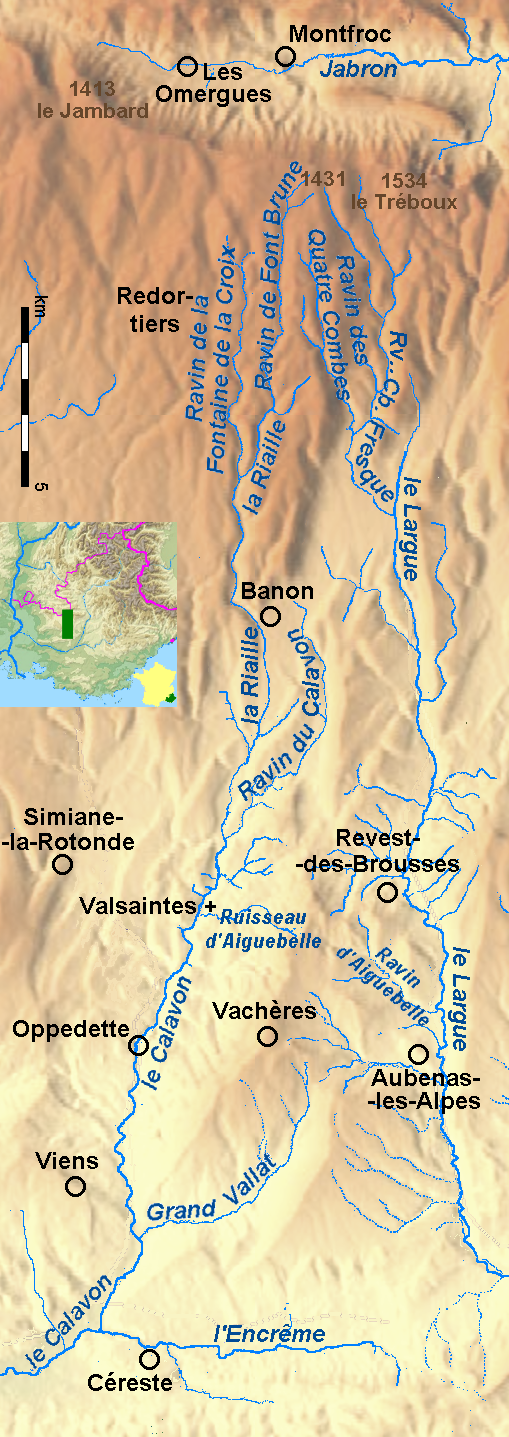
Aubenas-les-Alpes on the upper course of river Largue

Aubenas-les-Alpes lies in the Regional Natural Park of Luberon and the Geological Reserve of Luberon some 18 km north-west of Manosque and 20 km west of La Brillanne. The village is at an altitude of 650m above sea level. Access to the commune is by road D555 which branches off the D5 some 4 km north of Saint-Michel-l'Observatoire and goes west by a circuitous route to the village. There are also other country roads to access the commune. Apart from the village there is the hamlet of Le Paraire in the north. The commune is mixed farmland and forest.

The Largue river forms the eastern border of the commune as it flows south to eventually join the Durance east of Manosque. Many tributaries rise in the commune and flow east to join the Largue including the Ravin d'Aiguebelle and the Riou.

=== Geology ===
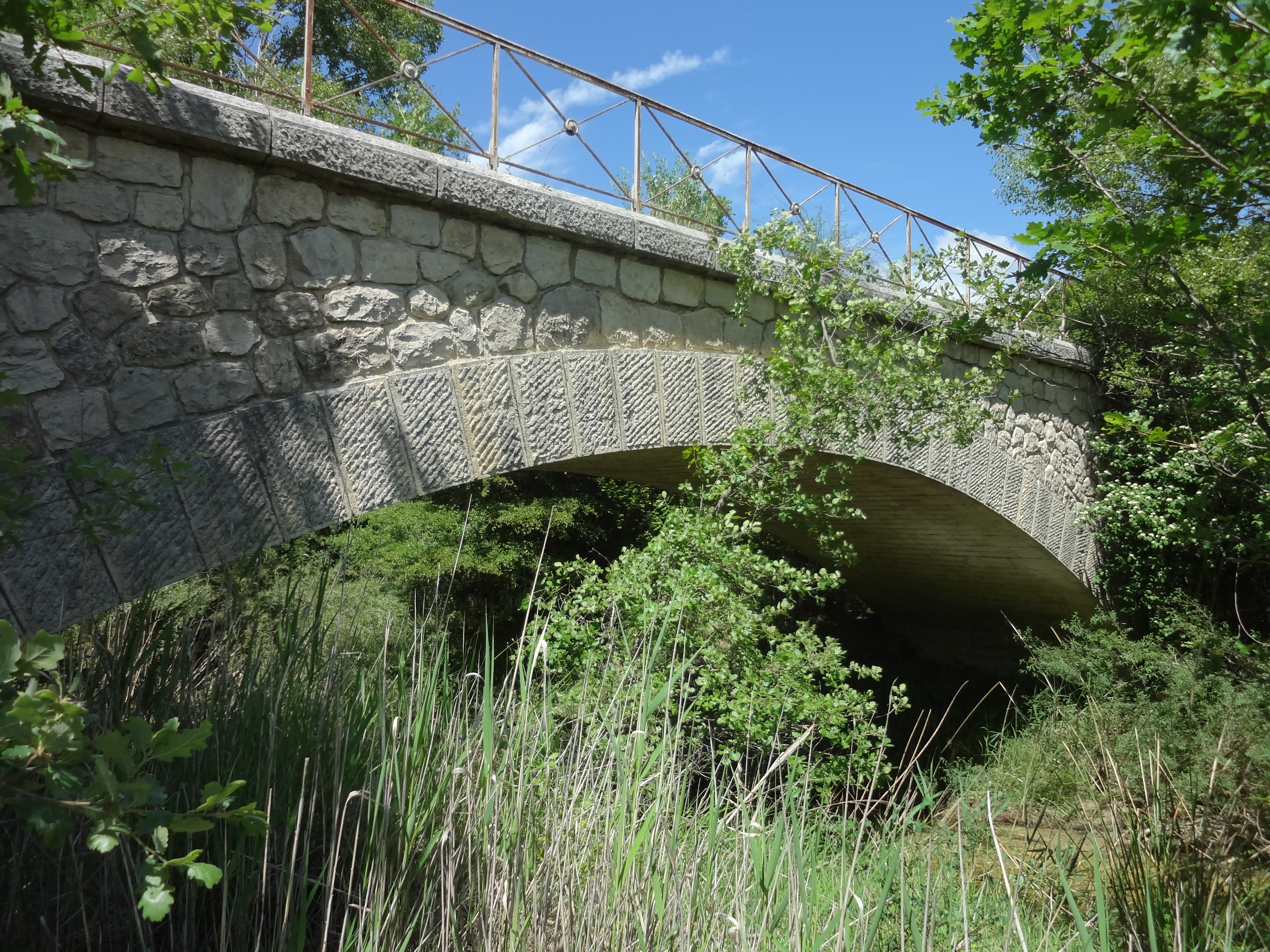
A bridge over the Largue.

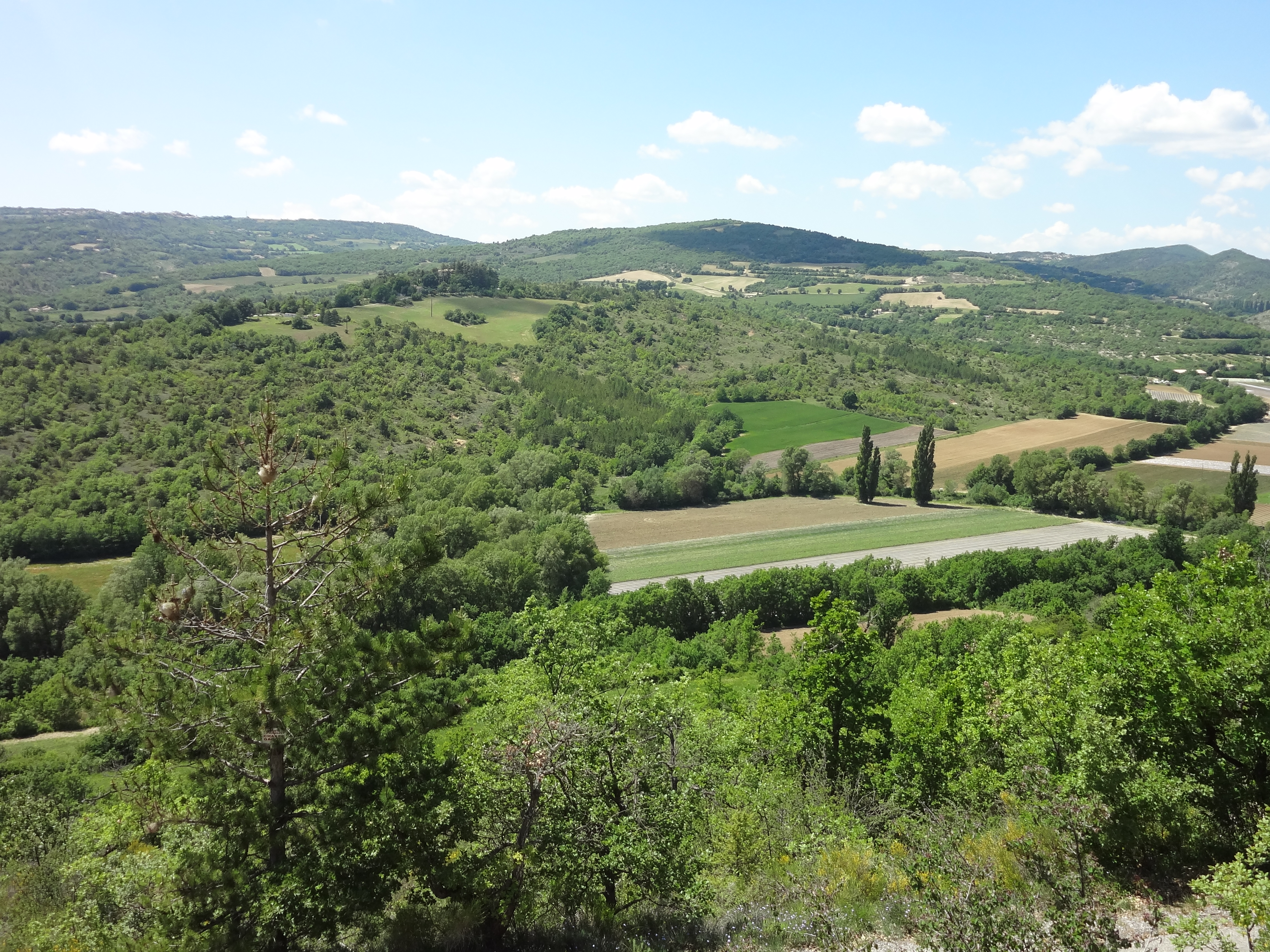
Low relief hills in the south of the commune.

The soils of the commune are formed on a substrate which is mainly limestone: this limestone is also used to roof the housing. The village is however located on a hill of red marl of the Oligocene period and has yielded bones of large mammals and reptiles (crocodile and turtle). In the Aiguebelle valley (a stream that never runs dry even in the most severe droughts) fossils of plants and fish (Smerdi macrurus) have also been found. The areas of both deposits are classified as geological reserves (included in the Natural Geological Reserve of Luberon) and collecting of fossils is prohibited. Information panels are placed close by. A selection of fossils from there can be seen at the Vachères Museum, at the Natural Regional Park of Luberon Maison du Parc in Apt (Vaucluse), and the National Museum of Natural History in Paris (Jardin des Plantes).

Along the Largue and the Aiguebelle towards Vachères and Revest-des-Brousses, the Oligocene limestone contains lenses of brown flint which were extensively exploited from the Middle Paleolithic (Levallois-type industry) to the end of the Neolithic period. Flint was exported all over the south-east of France as far as Italy by Neolithic man.

=== Natural and technological hazards ===
None of the 200 communes of the department are in a no seismic risk zone. The Canton of Reillane, to which Aubenas-les-Alpes belongs, is zone 1b (low risk) according to the deterministic classification of 1991 based on its seismic history, and zone 3 (moderate risk) according to the probabilistic classification EC8 of 2011. The commune of Aubenas-les-Alpes is also exposed to three other natural hazards:

- forest fire;
- landslide: the commune is almost entirely rated with an average to high hazard.

The commune is not exposed to any risk of technological origin as identified by the prefecture.

There is no risk prevention plan for foreseeable natural risks (PPR) for the commune and also no DICRIM.

== Toponymy ==
The locality appears for the first time in texts from the 11th century in the form de Albenassio. According to Charles Rostaing, Aubenas comes from the Gallic alba with the suffixes -enne and -ate, in the general sense of a "citadel". According to Ernest Nègre, the name comes from the Roman name Albinus with the suffix -àtis. The Fénié propose another interpretation coming from the name Aubenas in the theme *Al-b-, having reference to the mountain.

None of these explanations can explain the form of the name Aubenas in Occitan which is aùbo meaning "white poplar".

The commune changed its name to Aubenas-les-Alpes in 1934.

== History ==
The territory of the commune was inhabited in the Middle Paleolithic period but it was especially in the Neolithic that the area experienced increased human activity. The quality of the flint outcroppings in the Largue valley allows its breakdown into large blades. Due to the use of leverage, these materials were produced in large numbers and many of these workshops are known to be in the commune. These blades were distributed over a wide geographical area. The density of Neolithic occupation in the Largue valley was recognized early in the 20th century. In 1906, Mr. Deydier mentioned the existence of many Neolithic flint quarries over an area of hundreds of hectares in the communes of Saint-Michel-l'Observatoire, Vachères, and Aubenas-les-Alpes. The Inventory of Neolithic and protohistoric settlements lists 12 sites in the commune of Aubenas-les-Alpes.

There is no indication of occupation during the metal ages.

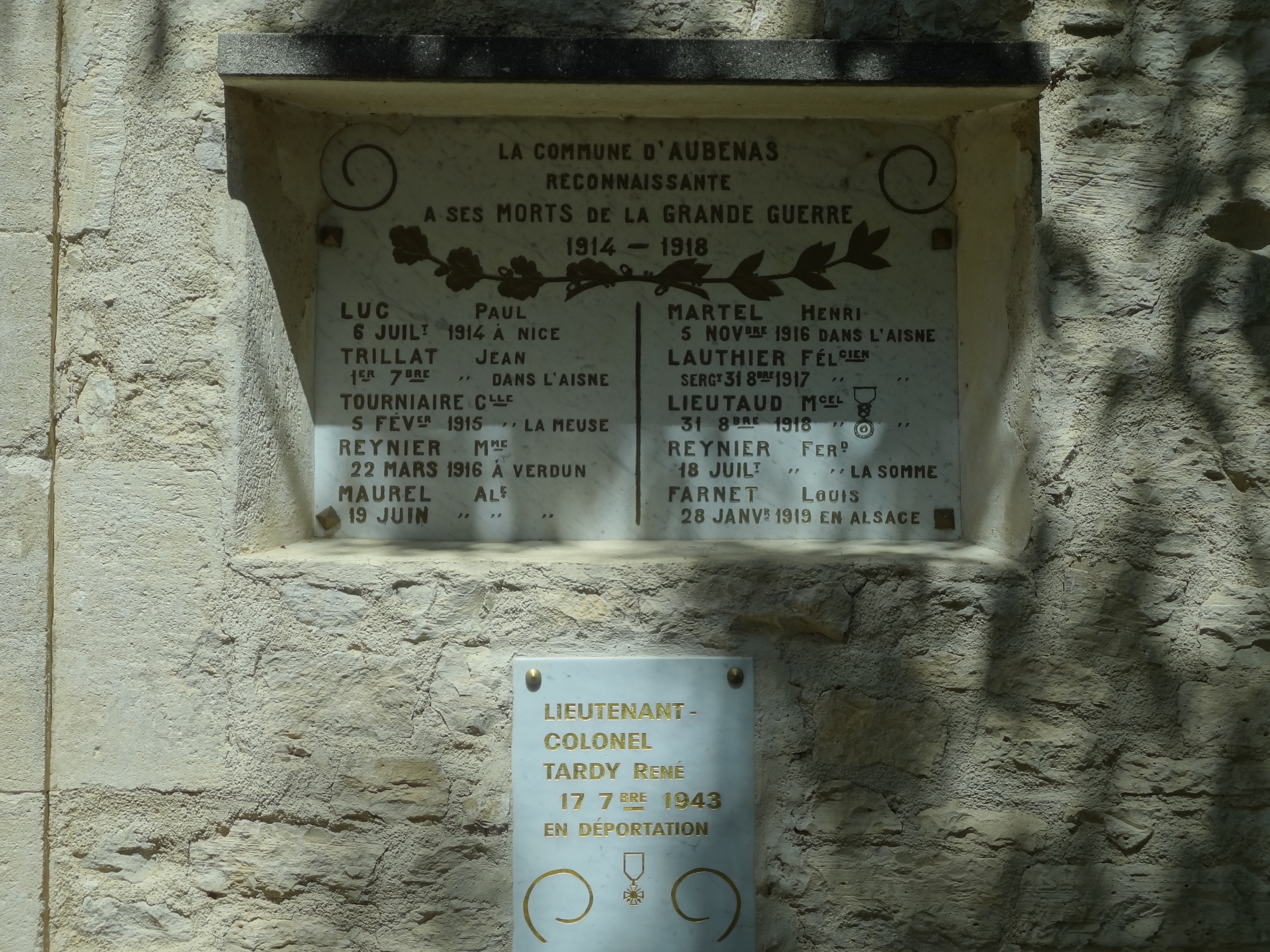
Plaque on the War memorial at Aubenas.

In several parts of the commune there are ceramic Tegulae and Terra sigillata which indicate occupation in Gallo-Roman times. In Antiquity the Aubenas area was part of the land of the Sogiontiques (Sogiontii), whose territory extended from the Baronnies to the Durance. The Sogiontiques were federated with the Vocontii and, after the Roman conquest, they were attached with them to the Roman province of Gallia Narbonensis. In the 2nd century they were detached from Vocontii and formed a distinct Civitas with their capital at Segustero (Sisteron).

While the south-east of Gaul was Burgundian land, the king of the Ostrogoths, Theodoric the Great, conquered the region between the Durance, the Rhône, and Isère in 510. The commune depended briefly on Italy until 526. In order to reconcile with the Burgundian king Godomar III, the Ostrogothic regent Amalasontha gave him the territory.

Called Albenacum or Castrum de Albenis in the Middle Ages, little is known about the history of the fief of Aubenas and its fief of Aiguebelle. The present village is a relic of an urban area that covered the whole hill around the castle. The Aubenas community was under the Viguerie of Forcalquier. A Benedictine priory was established at a place called Saint-Jean.

The death of Queen Joanna I of Naples created a crisis of succession at the head of the County of Provence: the towns of the Union of Aix (1382–1387) supported Charles, Duke of Durazzo, against Louis I, Duke of Anjou. One of the co-lords of Aubenas, Guyon de Lincel, rallied to the Angevins in 1385 after the death of Louis I.

The Largue and Aiguebelle valleys were the sites of several mills. Today a dozen mills still exist.

As with many communes in the department, Aubenas had a school well before the Jules Ferry laws: in 1863 it already had one that provided primary education for boys in the chief town. No instruction was given to girls: neither the Falloux Laws (1851), which required the opening of a girls' school in communes with more than 800 inhabitants nor the first Duruy law (1867), which lowered the threshold to 500 inhabitants affected Aubenas. It was only after the Ferry laws that the girls in the commune were regularly educated.

In the 20th century the cultivation of lavender was established and also a distillery. Meanwhile, the culture of grapevines for the production of wine reserved for consumption was progressively phased out.

=== Heraldry ===
Arms of Aubenas-les-Alpes	Blazon: Gules, a Roman letter A of Or from the transverse of which is interlaced an oval annulet the same posed in pale with a small latin cross the same attached below.

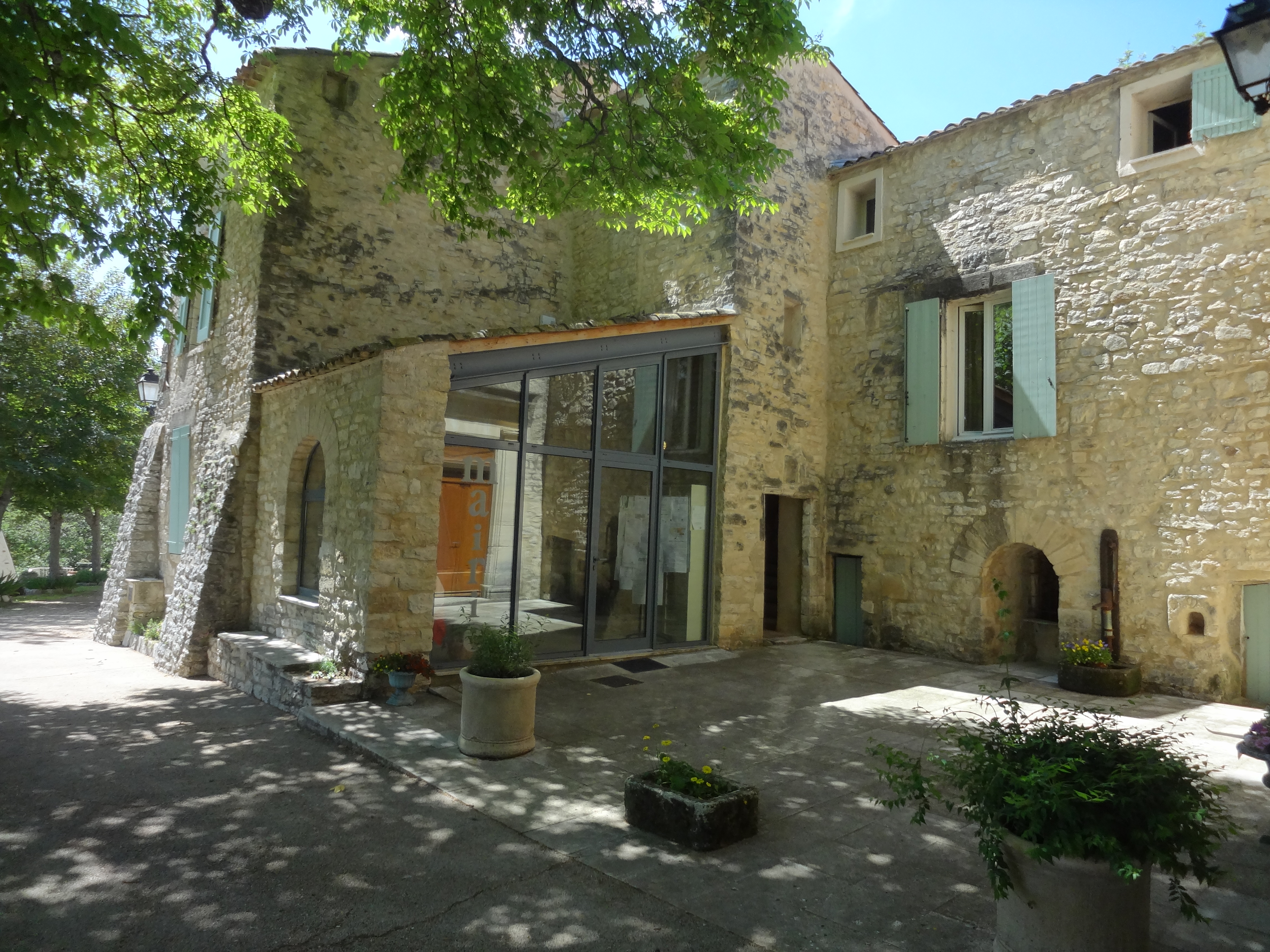
The Aubenas Town Hall in the old presbytery

=== Inter-communality ===
Aubenas-les-Alpes is part of the community of communes of Haute-Provence-Pays de Banon which includes 21 communes.

=== Budget and taxation ===
The taxation of households and businesses in Aubenas-les-Alpes in 2009
Tax	Communal part	Inter-communal part	Departmental part	Regional part
Household tax (TH)	5.00%	30.30%	5.53%	0.00%
Property tax on buildings (TFPB)	4.30%	8.94%	14.49%	2.36%
Property tax on undeveloped land (TFPNB)	12.30%	31.69%	47.16%	8.85%
Business tax (TP)	11.73%	6.37%	10.80%	3.84%

The Business tax was replaced in 2010 by the Property contribution of businesses (CFE) on the rental value of the property and by the Value-added contribution of the business sector (CVAE) - the two forming the Territorial Economic Contribution.

== Demography ==
The inhabitants of the commune are known as Albascecois or Albascecoises in French.

Historical population
Year	Pop.	±% p.a.
1968	38	—
1975	50	+4.00%
1982	59	+2.39%
1990	51	−1.80%
1999	62	+2.19%
2007	99	+6.02%
2012	105	+1.18%
2017	98	−1.37%
2023	90	−1.41%
Source: INSEE

In 1315 the commune had 60 fireplaces and in 1765 it had a population of 160.

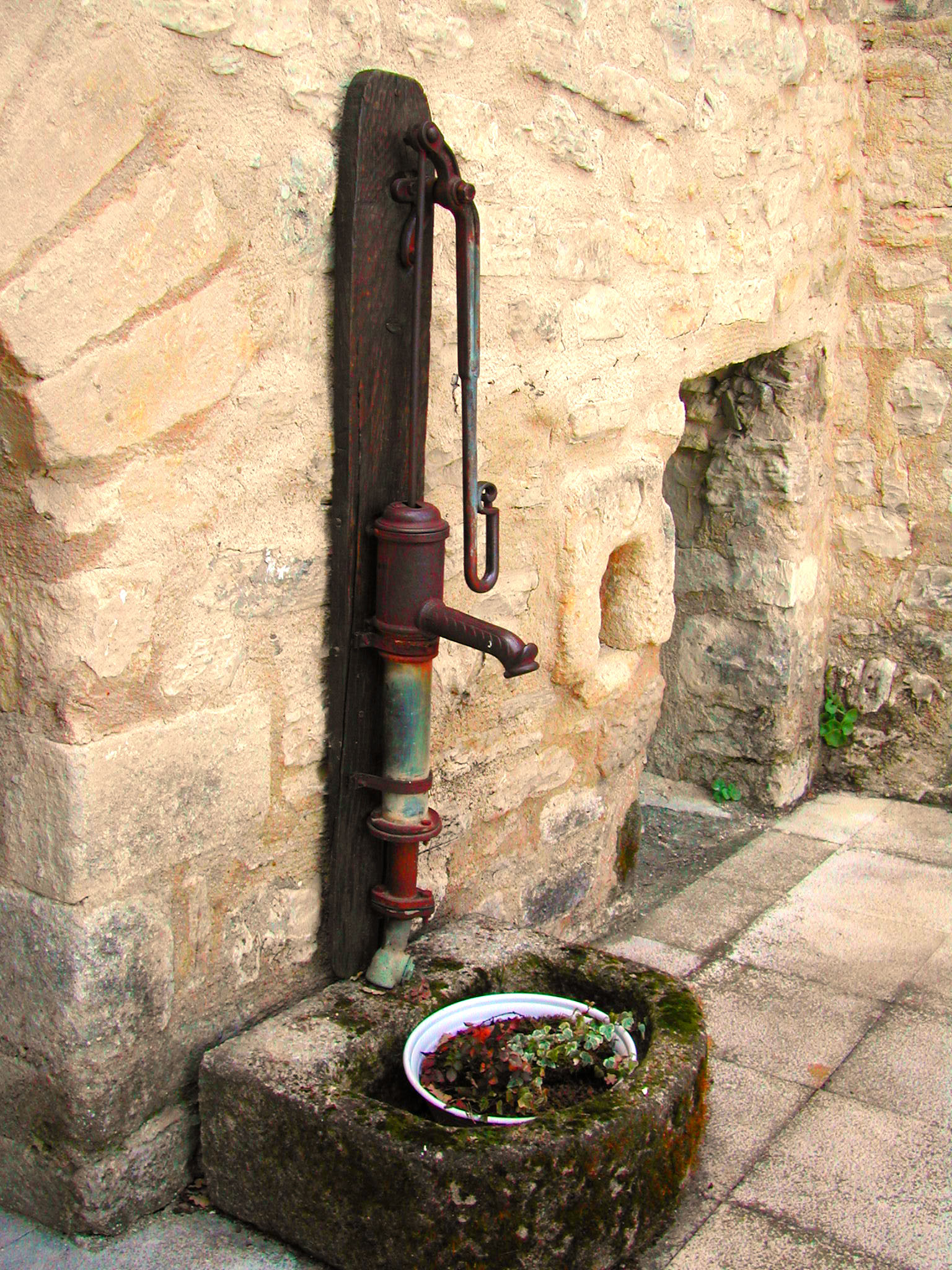
Village Pump

== Economy ==
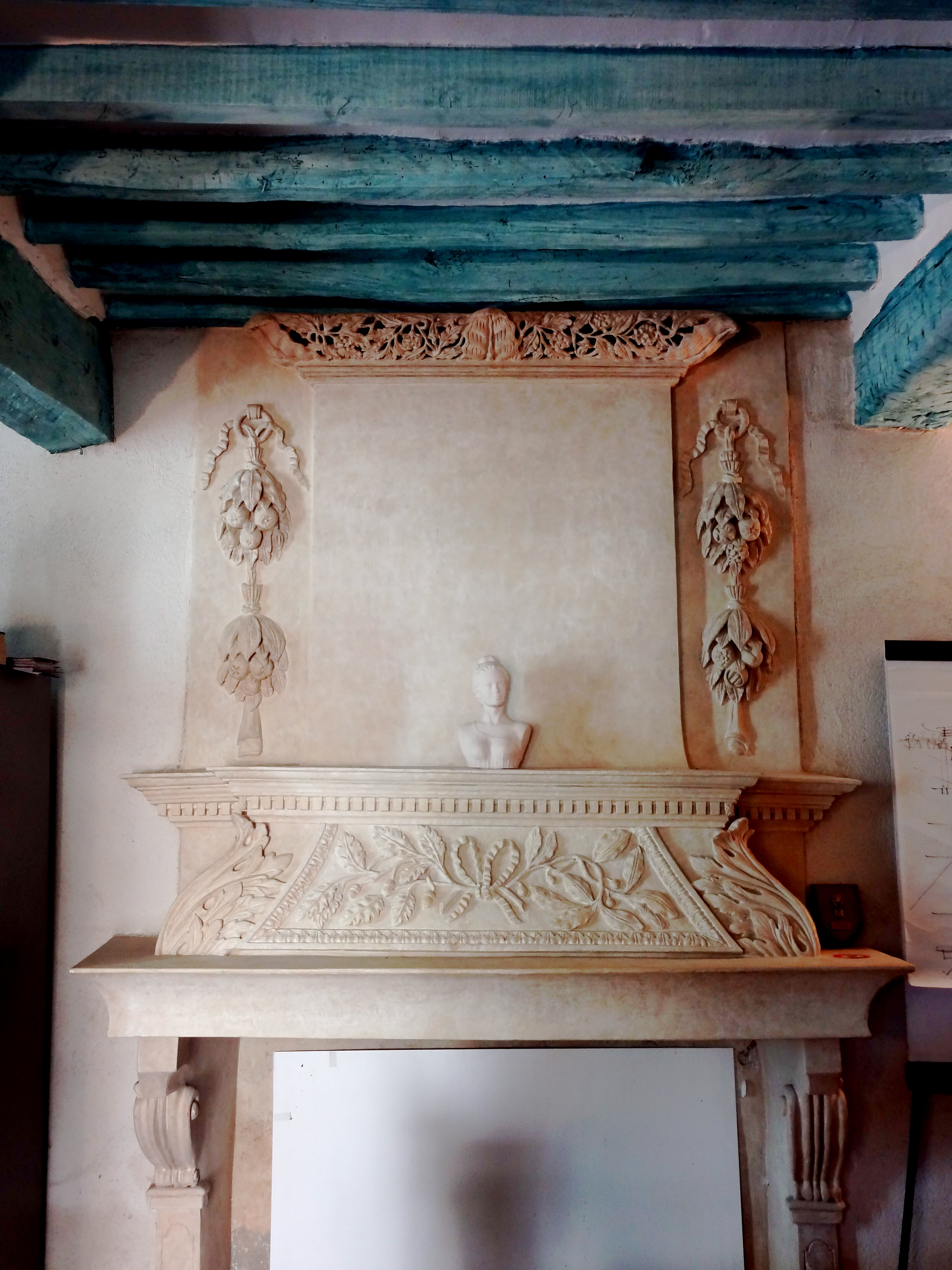
Fireplace decorated in gypserie from the old presbytery (Now the Town Hall)

In 2017, the active population amounted to 47 people, including 13 unemployed (27%). These workers are in majority employees (67%), and are in majority employed in the commune (53%).

At the end of 2015 the agricultural sector had no paid jobs out of 2 establishments. The secondary sector had four businesses with one paid job. Finally there were 13 businesses in the trade and services sector (one paid job) and two establishments in the public sector (one paid job).

From 1988 to 2000, the number of farms decreased from 8 to 5. The utilized agricultural area (SAU) followed the same movement, from 338 to 257 hectares. Agricultural abandonment however seems to have stopped: the number of farms, according to Agreste Department of Agriculture survey, remained stable in the 2000s at 5: all arable farms. At the same time the utilized agricultural area has increased by a third to 350 ha - more than in 1988 - which are devoted entirely to arable crops.

The commune is located on the edge of production of Olive oil of Provence AOC but there is no olive farm in the commune.

According to Departmental Observatory of tourism, tourism is important for the commune with between 1 and 5 tourists welcomed per resident per year. Accommodation in the commune consists of:

- furnished;
- Hotel rooms;
- 18 second homes: 31% of the housing in the commune.

== Culture and heritage ==
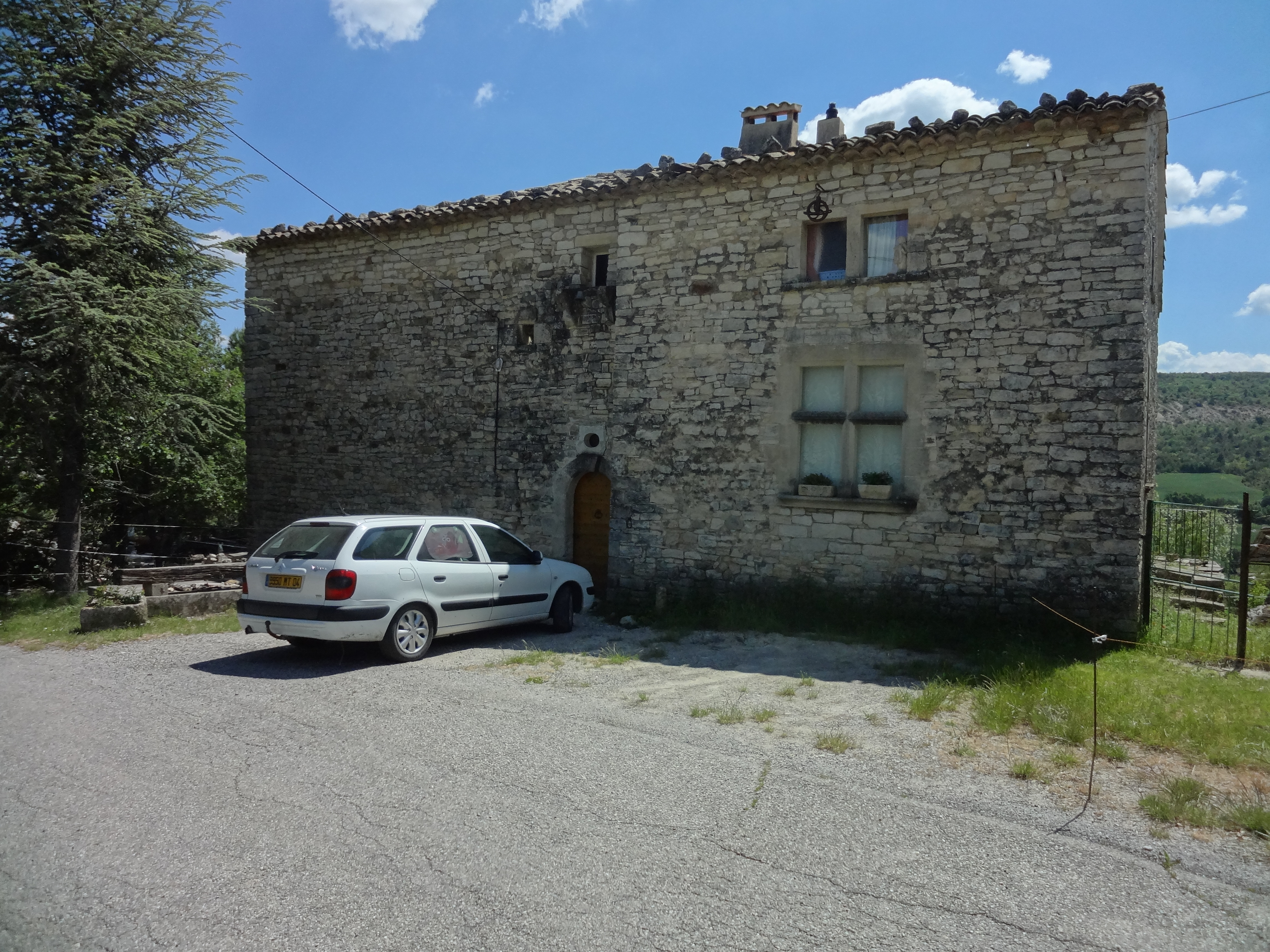
The Vicarage

=== Civil heritage ===
The chateau dates from the end of the 16th century and was built on foundations from the 11th century. The arches on the lower floors are from the 13th century. On a rectangular plan, only a single tower remains. Only a little has been restored. The Vicarage is today isolated below the village although it was formerly in the village. It is a beautiful building from the 16th century with mullioned windows.

The Town Hall is located in the former presbytery and contains a small but remarkable fireplace with plasterwork from the 18th century: a rare case of chimney plasterwork in a commoner's house.

During the 19th century several mills were in operation on the shores of the Largue and the Aiguebelle. Their ponds and bays can still be seen (The Paraire, the Moulin de la Combe, the Moulin Brun, the Moulin Bas, the Moulin du Plan).

There is still a Dovecote in the commune in the form of a tower at Moulin.

In the hamlet of Paraire there are several Renaissance houses still with their mullioned windows and lintels.

=== Religious heritage ===
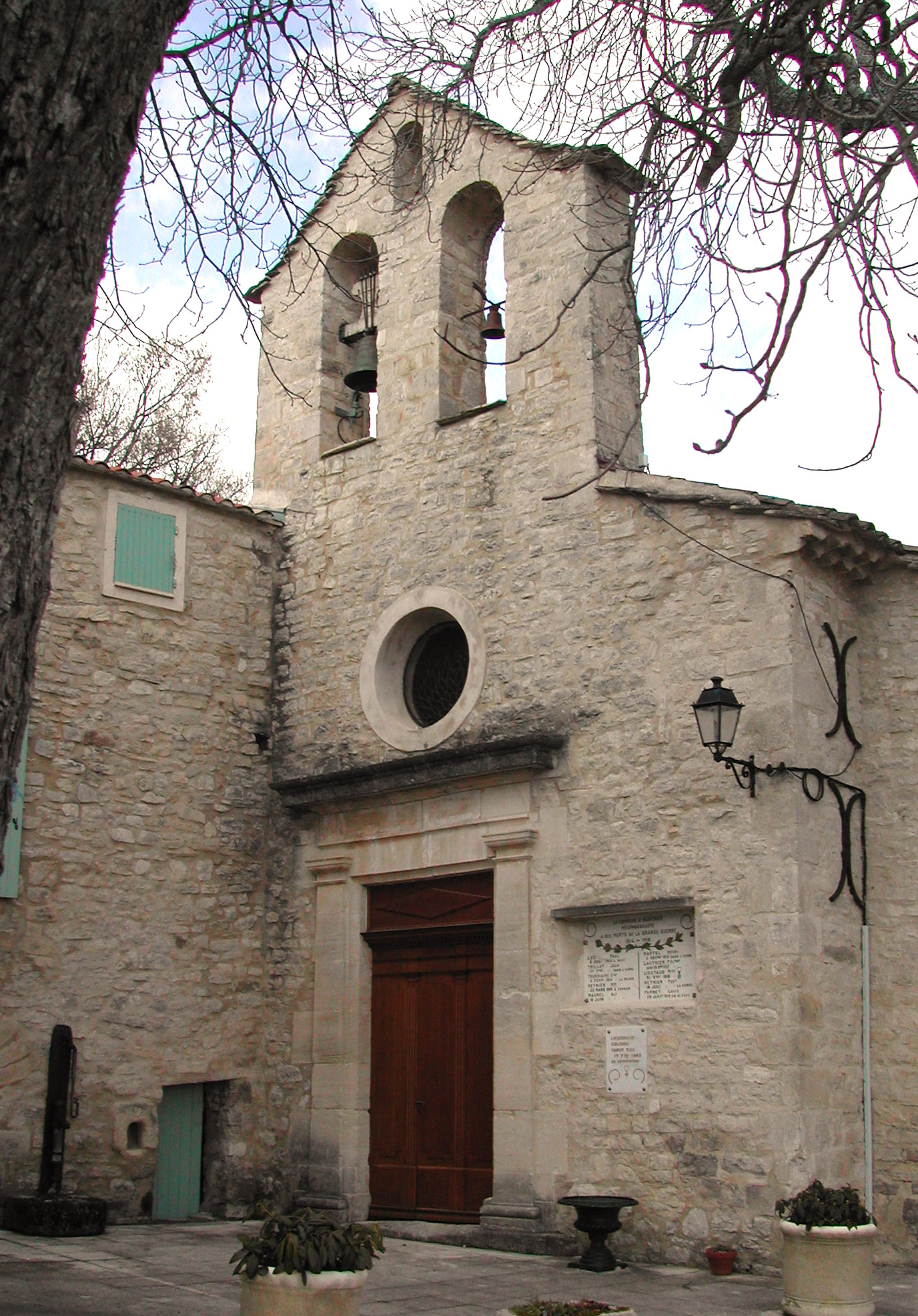
Church of the Assumption

The Church of the Assumption of the Virgin and the Presbytery on a square shaded by hundred-year-old Linden trees are the last remains of the medieval village. The church is partly Romanesque and partly rebuilt in the 17th century. Its bell tower and arches date to the 13th century. Wall paintings from the 18th century have been identified in the nave and restored. Three items in the church have been registered as historical objects:

- A Reliquary-Statue: Virgin and Child (19th century)
- A Painting: The Assumption (19th century)
- The Altar, altar seating, and Tabernacle (19th century)
Ornaments in the Church of the Assumption

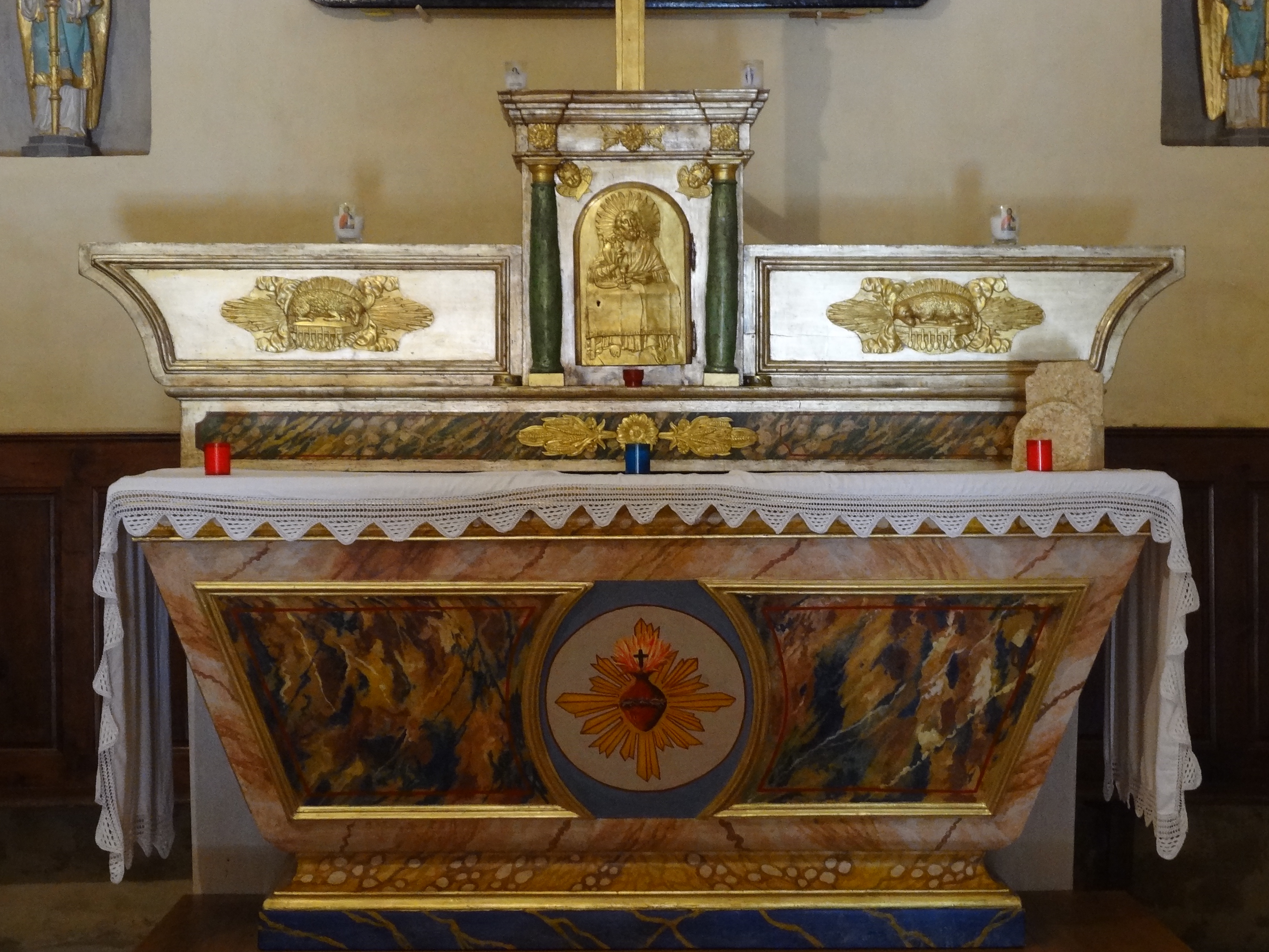
The Altar

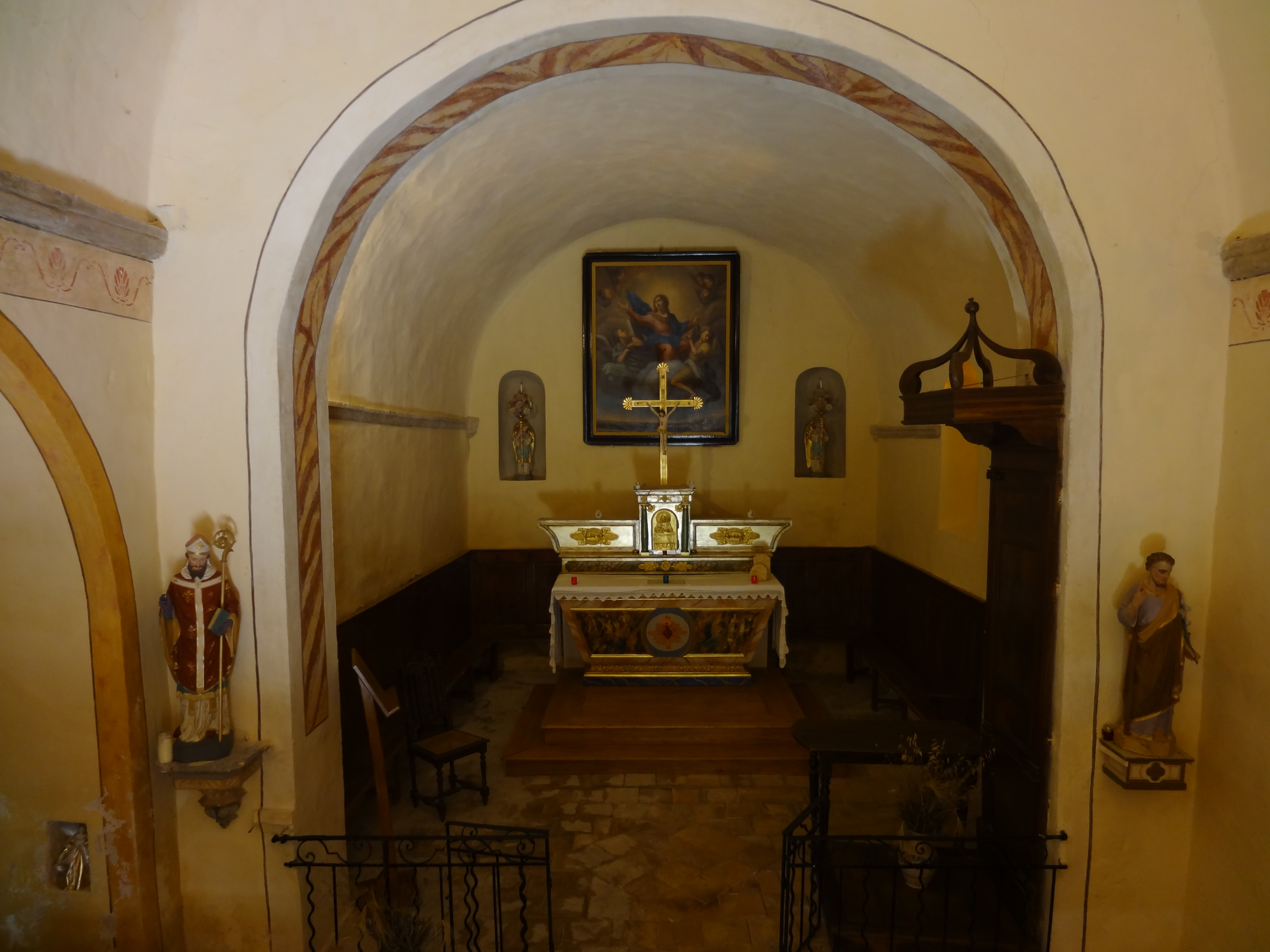
The Altar with the painting of The Assumption

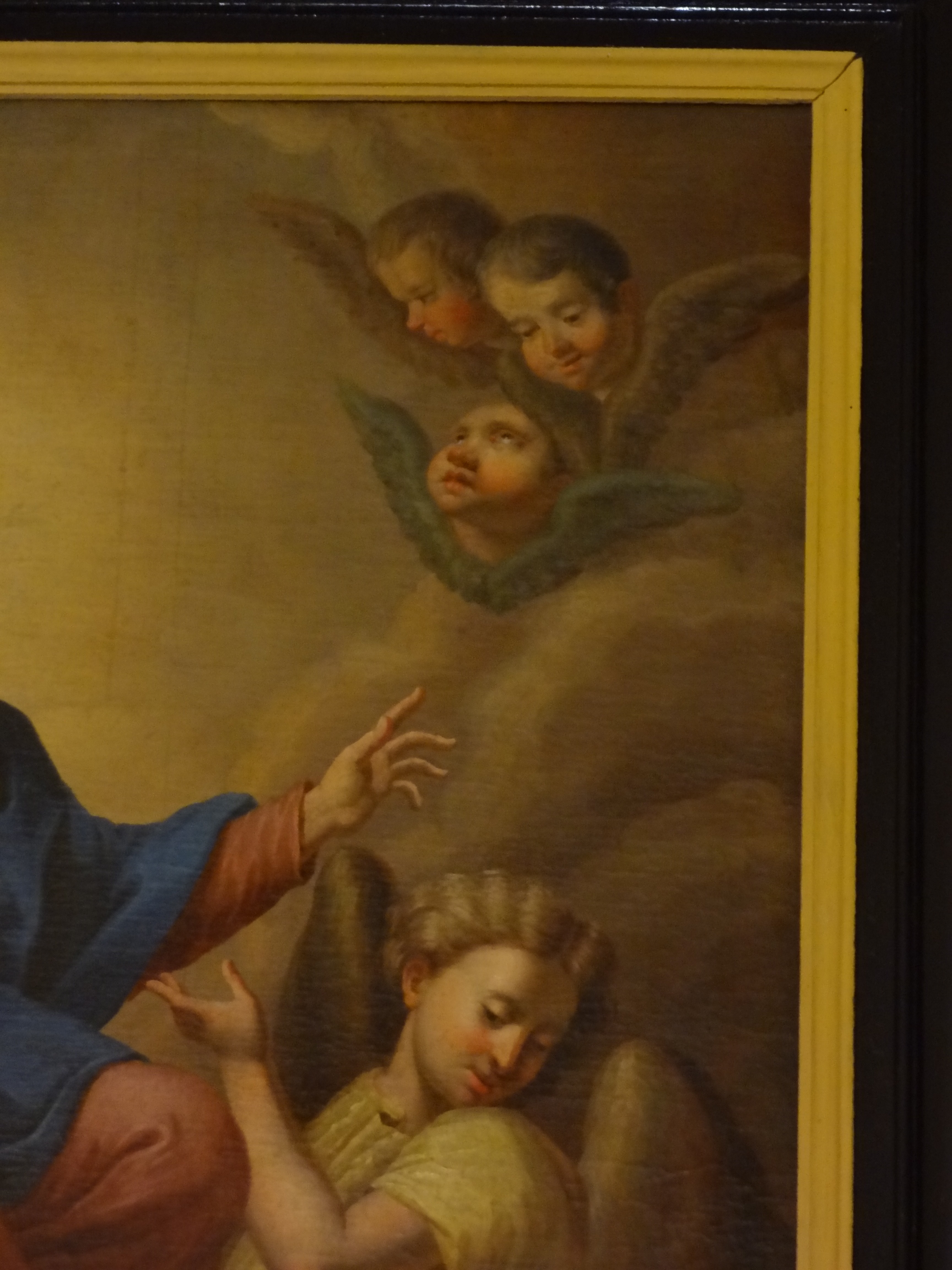
Detail of the painting

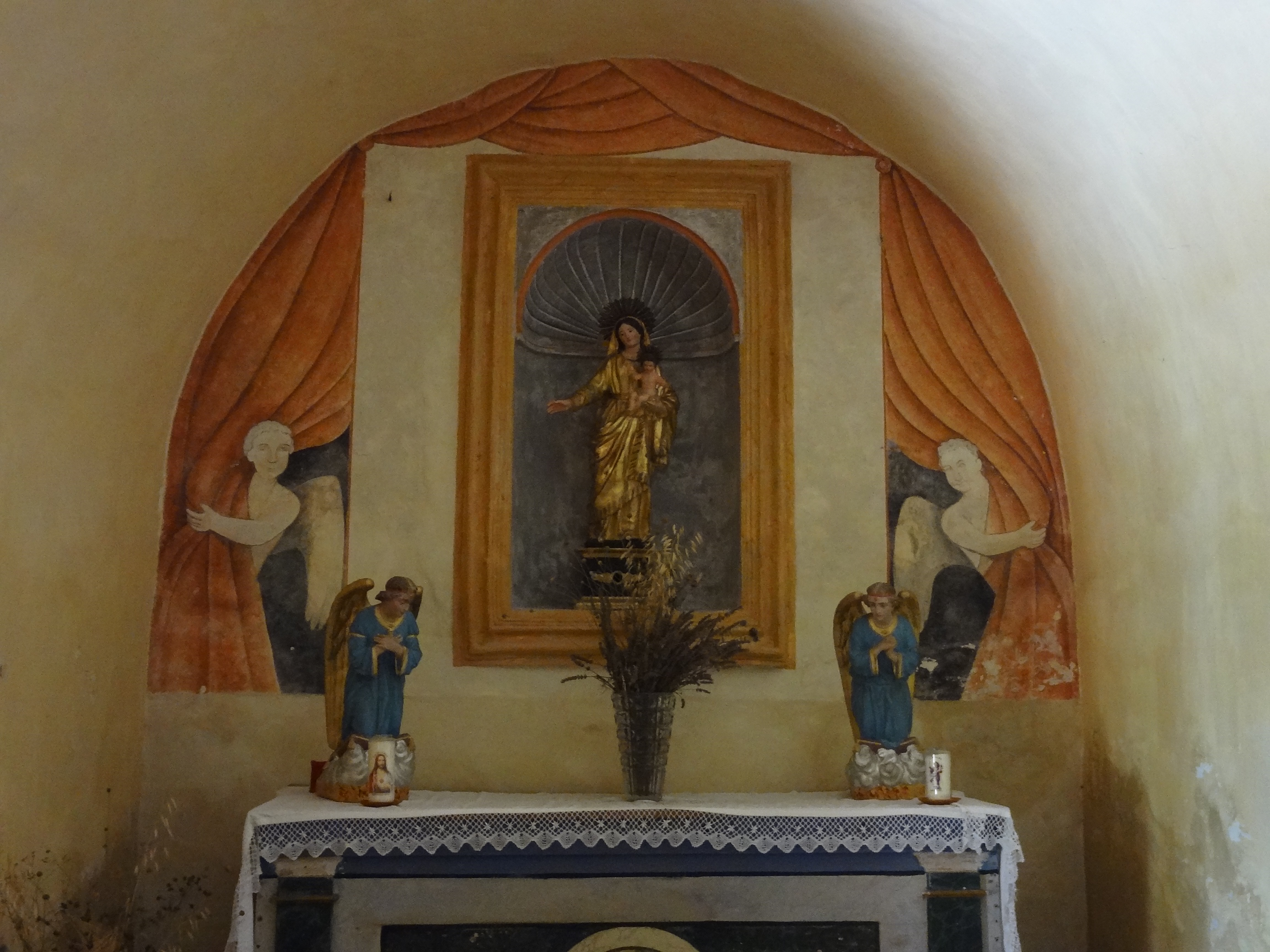
Chapel of the Virgin

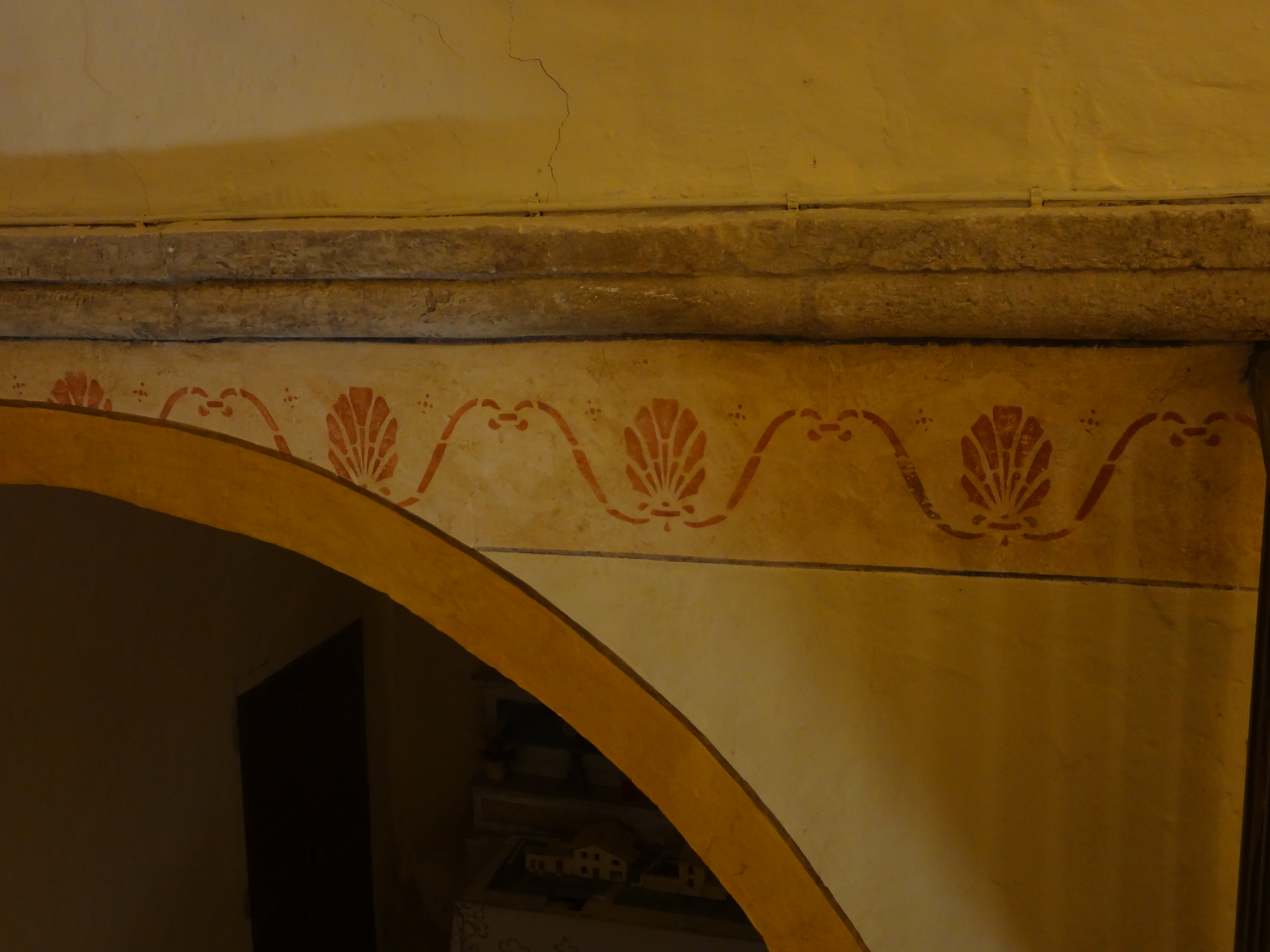
An old frieze depicting the pilgrimage to Saint-Jacques-de-Compostelle

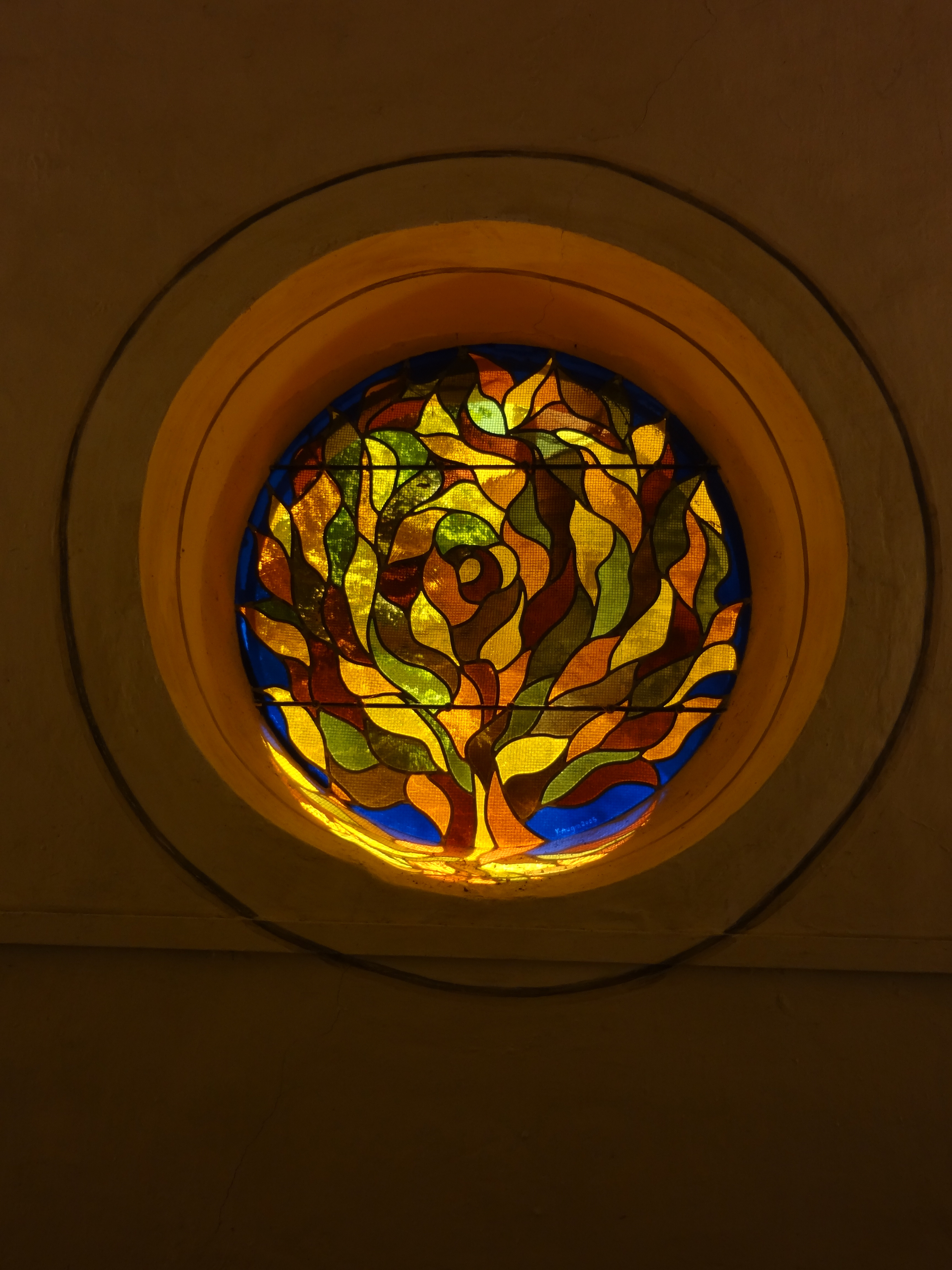
Modern stained glass

== Bibliography ==
- Raymond Collier, Haute-Provence monumental and artistic, Digne, Imprimerie Louis Jean, 1986, 559 p. (in French)
- Under the direction of Édouard Baratier, Georges Duby, and Ernest Hildesheimer, Historical Atlas of Provence, County of Venaissin, Principality of Orange, County of Nice, Principality of Monaco, Librairie Armand Colin, Paris, 1969, 223 pages (in French)

== See also ==
- Luberon
- Communes of the Alpes-de-Haute-Provence department
