= Villemus =

- Commune
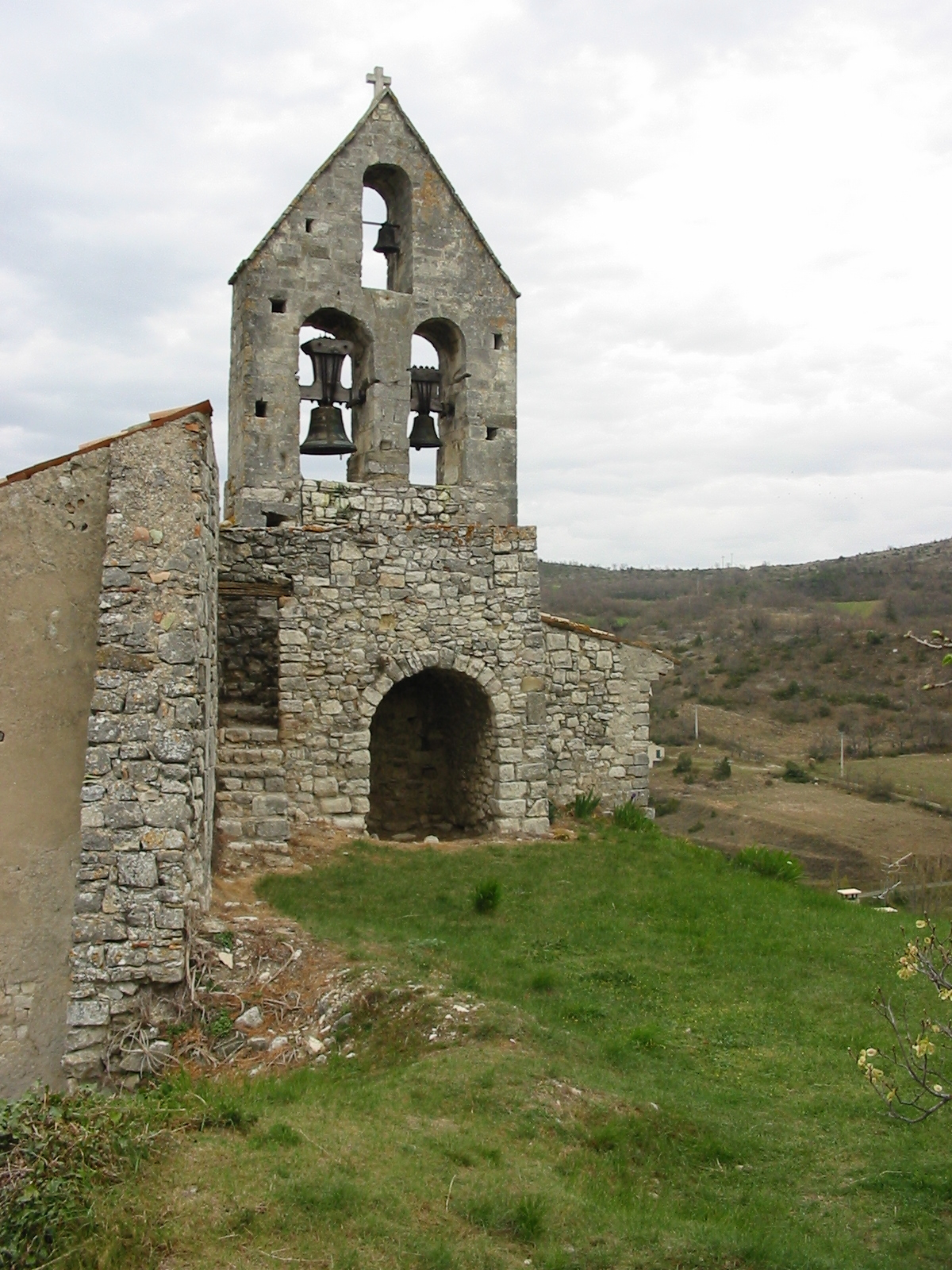
- The bell tower of the church in Villemus

- Coat of arms
- Location of Villemus
- Location within France Location within Provence-Alpes-Côte d'Azur
- Coordinates: 43°51′35″N 5°42′06″E
- Country: France
- Region: Provence-Alpes-Côte d'Azur
- Department: Alpes-de-Haute-Provence
- Arrondissement: Forcalquier
- Canton: Reillanne

Government
  - Mayor (2026–32): Pierre Pourcin
- Area^{1}: 9.59 km^{2} (3.70 sq mi)
- Elevation: 436 m (1,430 ft)
- Highest elevation: 779 m (2,556 ft)
- Lowest elevation: 424 m (1,391 ft)
- Population (2023): 192
  - Density: 20.0/km^{2} (51.9/sq mi)
- Time zone: UTC+01:00 (CET)
  - Summer (DST): UTC+02:00 (CEST)
- INSEE/Postal code: 04241 /04110
- ^{1} French Land Register data, which excludes lakes, ponds, glaciers > 1 km^{2} (0.386 sq mi or 247 acres) and river estuaries.

Villemus is a commune in the Alpes-de-Haute-Provence department in southeastern France.

== Population ==
Historical population
Year	Pop.	±% p.a.
1968	66	—
1975	71	+1.05%
1982	83	+2.26%
1990	99	+2.23%
1999	111	+1.28%
2007	152	+4.01%
2012	175	+2.86%
2017	189	+1.55%
2023	192	+0.26%
Source: INSEE

== See also ==
- Communes of the Alpes-de-Haute-Provence department
- Luberon
