= L'Hospitalet, Alpes-de-Haute-Provence =

L'Hospitalet
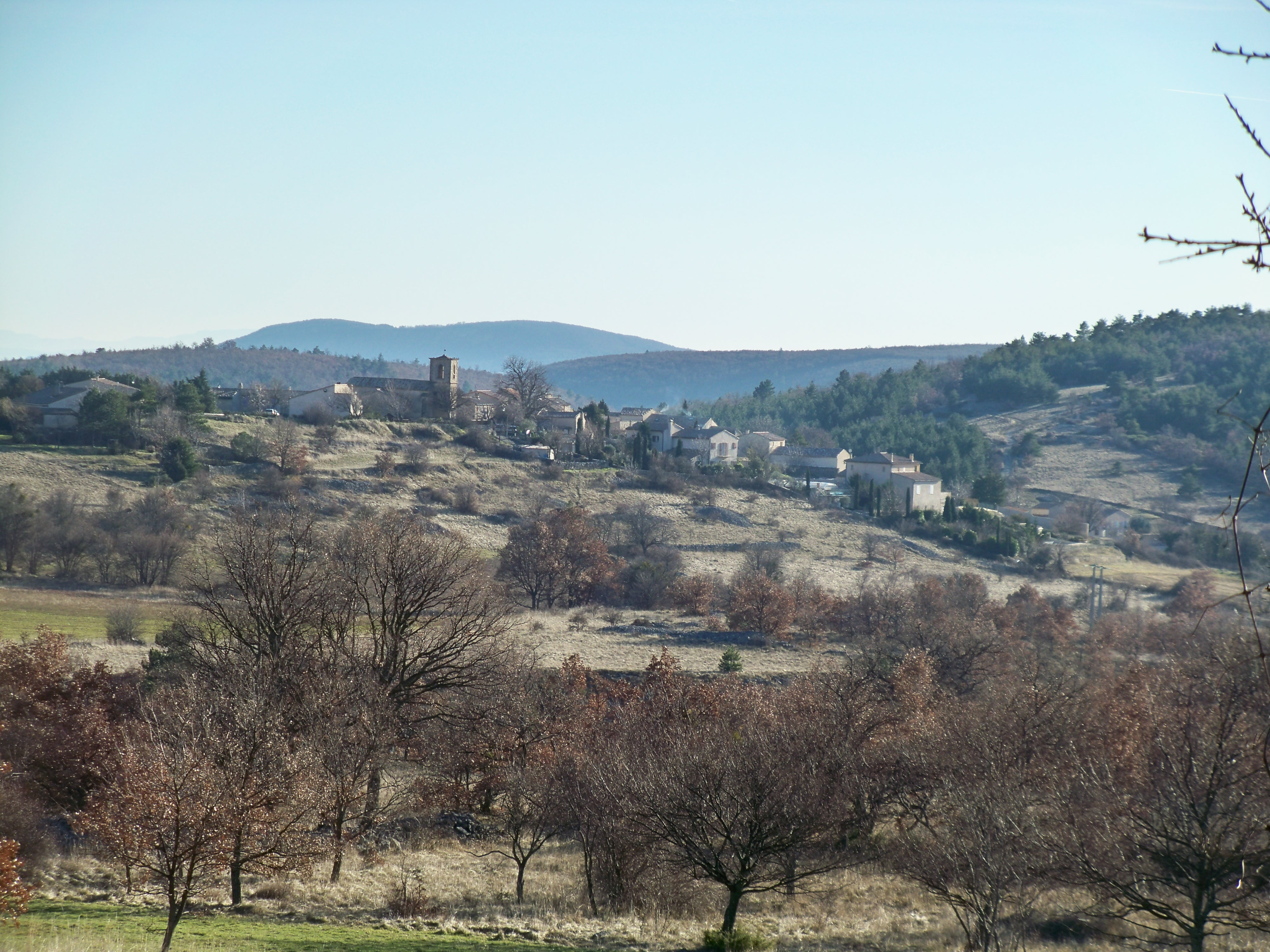
- A general view of L'Hospitalet

- Coat of arms
- Location of L'Hospitalet
- Location within France Location within Provence-Alpes-Côte d'Azur
- Coordinates: 44°05′16″N 5°41′57″E
- Country: France
- Region: Provence-Alpes-Côte d'Azur
- Department: Alpes-de-Haute-Provence
- Arrondissement: Forcalquier
- Canton: Reillanne

Government
  - Mayor (2026–32): Nicolas Lapaille
- Area^{1}: 19.35 km^{2} (7.47 sq mi)
- Elevation: 880 m (2,890 ft)
- Highest elevation: 1,632 m (5,354 ft)
- Lowest elevation: 779 m (2,556 ft)
- Population (2023): 99
  - Density: 5.1/km^{2} (13/sq mi)
- Time zone: UTC+01:00 (CET)
  - Summer (DST): UTC+02:00 (CEST)
- INSEE/Postal code: 04095 /04150
- ^{1} French Land Register data, which excludes lakes, ponds, glaciers > 1 km^{2} (0.386 sq mi or 247 acres) and river estuaries.

L'Hospitalet (French pronunciation: [lɔspitalɛ]; Occitan: L'Espitalet) is a commune in the Alpes-de-Haute-Provence department in southeastern France.

== Population ==
Historical population

Year	Pop.	±% p.a.
1793	227	—
1861	196	−0.22%
1911	126	−0.88%
1962	32	−2.65%
1968	49	+7.36%
1975	33	−5.49%
1982	52	+6.71%

Year	Pop.	±% p.a.
1990	58	+1.37%
1999	78	+3.35%
2007	89	+1.66%
2012	89	+0.00%
2017	90	+0.22%
2023	99	+1.60%

Source: INSEE

== See also ==
- Communes of the Alpes-de-Haute-Provence department
