= Simiane-la-Rotonde =

- Commune
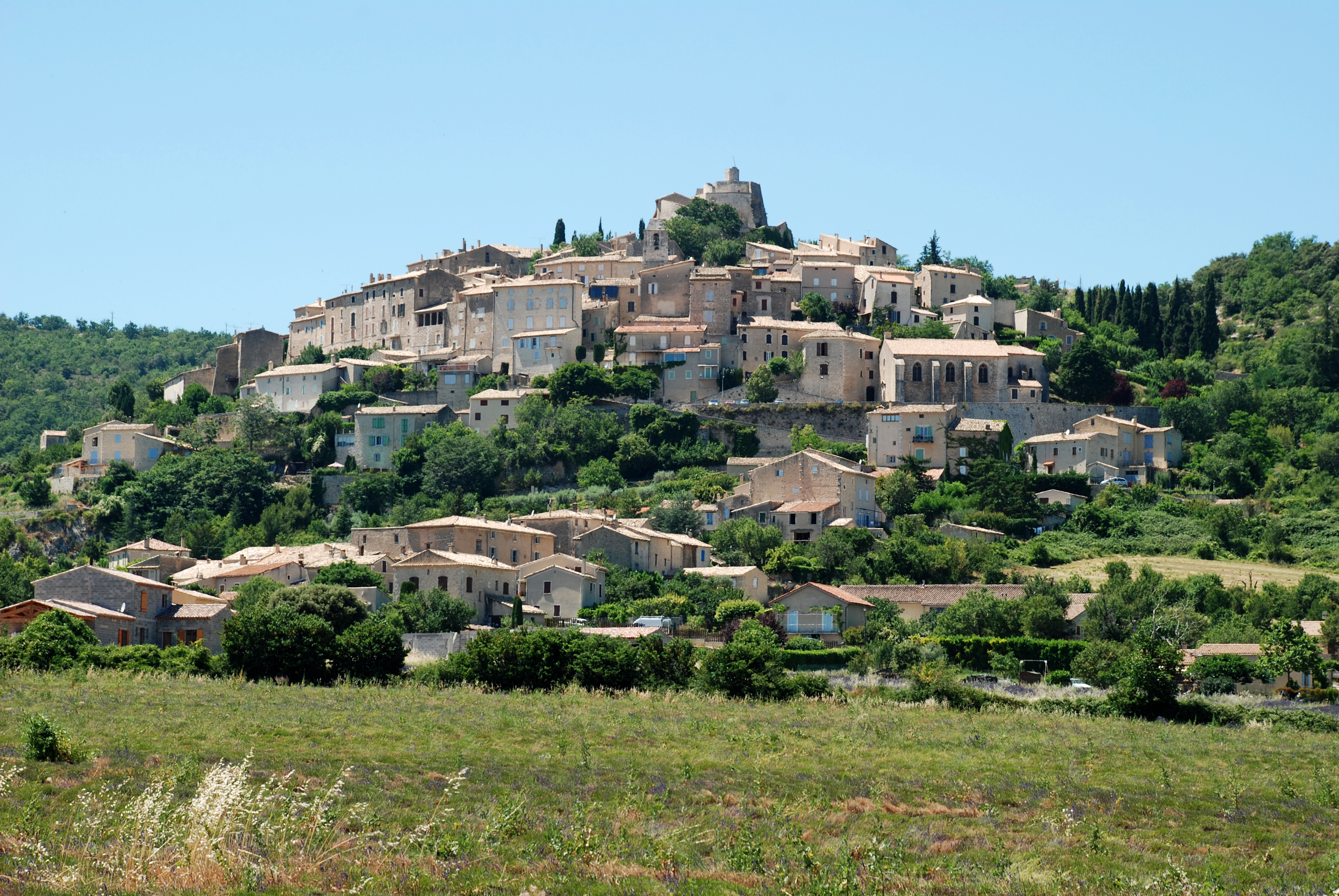
- A general view of the village of Simiane-la-Rotonde

- Coat of arms
- Location of Simiane-la-Rotonde
- Location within France Location within Provence-Alpes-Côte d'Azur
- Coordinates: 43°58′52″N 5°33′48″E
- Country: France
- Region: Provence-Alpes-Côte d'Azur
- Department: Alpes-de-Haute-Provence
- Arrondissement: Forcalquier
- Canton: Reillanne

Government
  - Mayor (2026–32): Thibault Dallaporta
- Area^{1}: 67.86 km^{2} (26.20 sq mi)
- Elevation: 630 m (2,070 ft)
- Highest elevation: 1,113 m (3,652 ft)
- Lowest elevation: 456 m (1,496 ft)
- Population (2023): 609
  - Density: 8.97/km^{2} (23.2/sq mi)
- Time zone: UTC+01:00 (CET)
  - Summer (DST): UTC+02:00 (CEST)
- INSEE/Postal code: 04208 /04150
- ^{1} French Land Register data, which excludes lakes, ponds, glaciers > 1 km^{2} (0.386 sq mi or 247 acres) and river estuaries.

Simiane-la-Rotonde (French pronunciation: [simjan la ʁɔtɔ̃d]; Occitan: Sumiana) is a commune in the Alpes-de-Haute-Provence department in southeastern France.

== Population ==
Historical population
Year	Pop.	±% p.a.
1968	361	—
1975	369	+0.31%
1982	434	+2.34%
1990	433	−0.03%
1999	532	+2.31%
2007	574	+0.95%
2012	602	+0.96%
2017	596	−0.20%
2023	609	+0.36%
Source: INSEE

== Geography ==
The commune is traversed by the river Calavon.

== See also ==
- Communes of the Alpes-de-Haute-Provence department
