= Oppedette =

- Commune
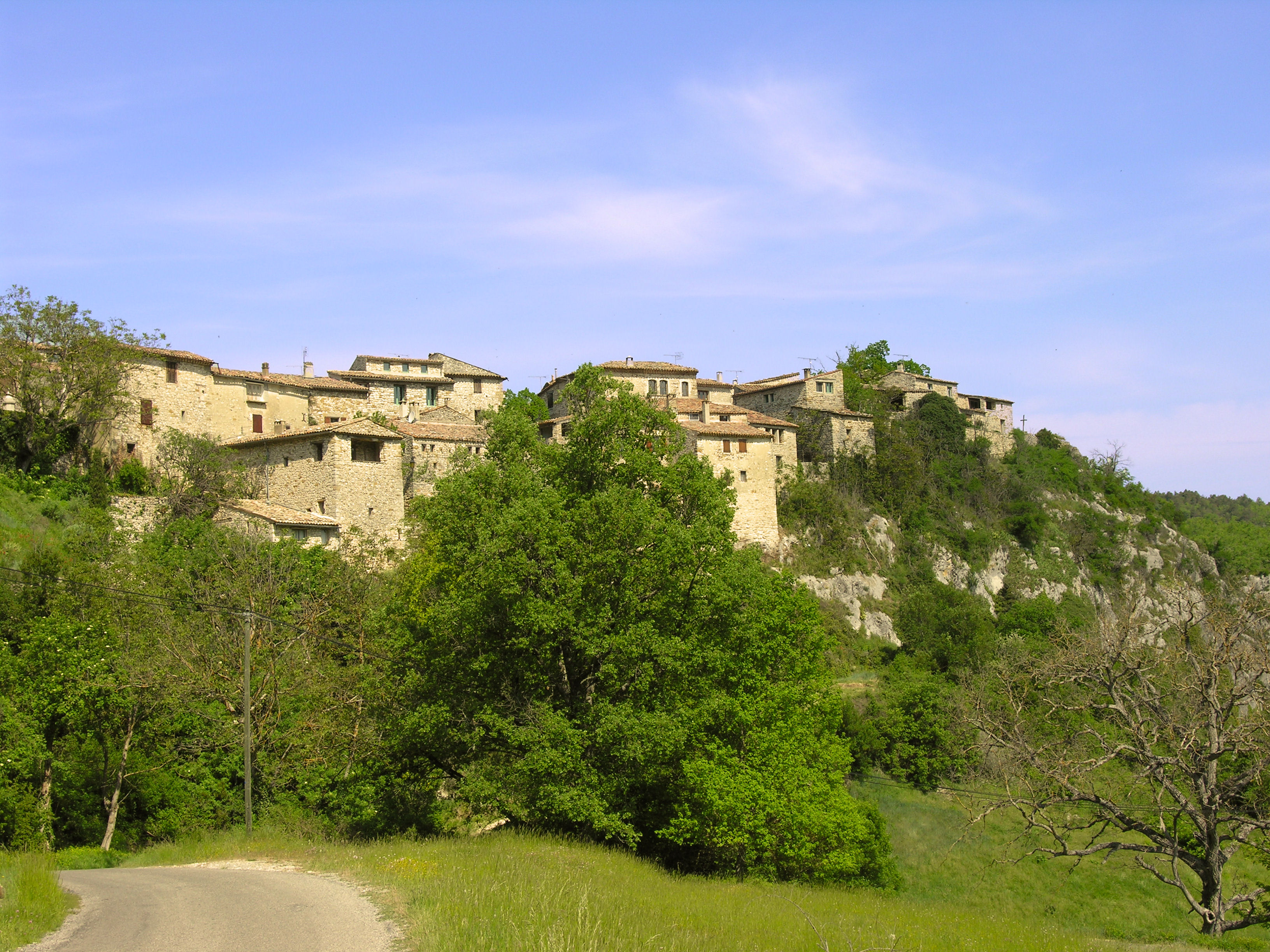
- A general view of the village of Oppedette

- Coat of arms
- Location of Oppedette
- Location within France Location within Provence-Alpes-Côte d'Azur
- Coordinates: 43°56′06″N 5°35′28″E
- Country: France
- Region: Provence-Alpes-Côte d'Azur
- Department: Alpes-de-Haute-Provence
- Arrondissement: Forcalquier
- Canton: Reillanne

Government
  - Mayor (2026–32): Philippe Vial
- Area^{1}: 8.49 km^{2} (3.28 sq mi)
- Highest elevation: 746 m (2,448 ft)
- Lowest elevation: 397 m (1,302 ft)
- Population (2023): 43
  - Density: 5.1/km^{2} (13/sq mi)
- Time zone: UTC+01:00 (CET)
  - Summer (DST): UTC+02:00 (CEST)
- INSEE/Postal code: 04142 /04110
- ^{1} French Land Register data, which excludes lakes, ponds, glaciers > 1 km^{2} (0.386 sq mi or 247 acres) and river estuaries.

Oppedette is a commune in the Alpes-de-Haute-Provence department in southeastern France.

== Geography ==
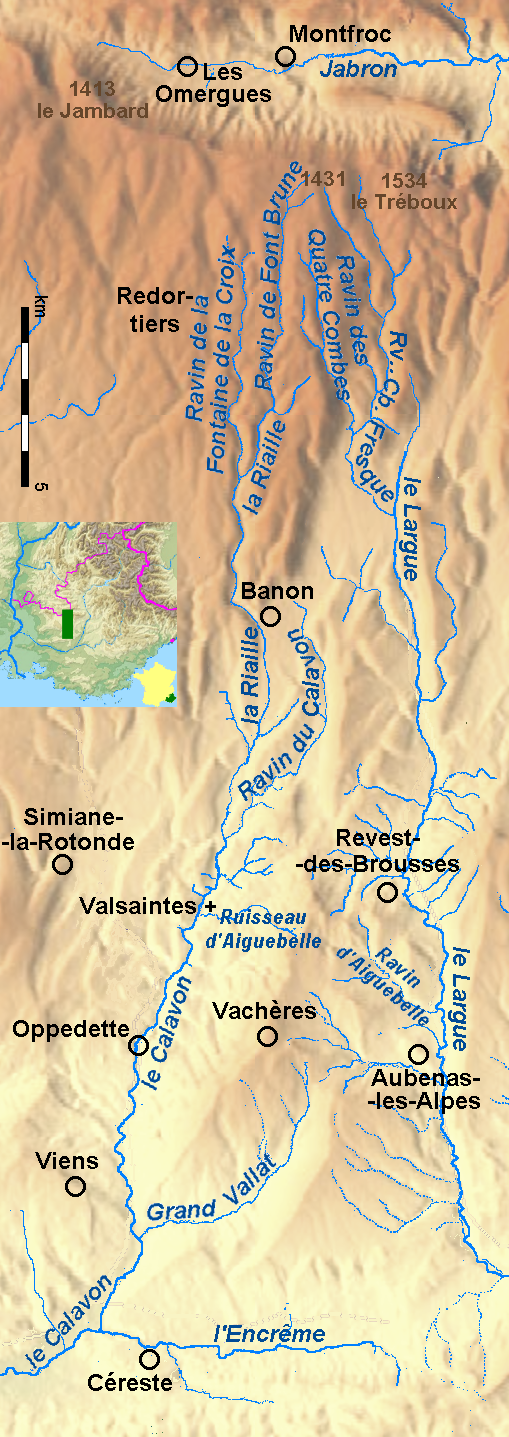
Oppedette on the upper course of river Calavon

The commune is traversed by the river Calavon.

== Population ==
Historical population
Year	Pop.	±% p.a.
1968	43	—
1975	52	+2.75%
1982	62	+2.54%
1990	38	−5.94%
1999	56	+4.40%
2007	63	+1.48%
2012	61	−0.64%
2017	52	−3.14%
2023	43	−3.12%
Source: INSEE

== See also ==
- Luberon
- Communes of the Alpes-de-Haute-Provence department
