= Canton of Reillanne =

Coordinates: 43°53′N 5°40′E

Reillanne
- Canton
- Interactive map of Reillanne
- Country: France
- Region: Provence-Alpes-Côte d'Azur
- Department: Alpes-de-Haute-Provence
- No. of communes: {{{nbcomm}}}
- Area: 502.64 km^{2} (194.07 sq mi)
- Population (2023): 11,268
  - Density: 22.418/km^{2} (58.061/sq mi)
- INSEE code: 04 11

The canton of Reillanne is an administrative division in southeastern France. At the French canton reorganisation which came into effect in March 2015, the canton was expanded from 8 to 21 communes:

1. Aubenas-les-Alpes
2. Banon
3. Céreste
4. Dauphin
5. L'Hospitalet
6. Mane
7. Montjustin
8. Montsalier
9. Oppedette
10. Redortiers
11. Reillanne
12. Revest-des-Brousses
13. Revest-du-Bion
14. La Rochegiron
15. Sainte-Croix-à-Lauze
16. Saint-Maime
17. Saint-Michel-l'Observatoire
18. Saumane
19. Simiane-la-Rotonde
20. Vachères
21. Villemus

== Demographics ==
Historical population
| Year | Pop. | ±% p.a. |
|---|---|---|
| 2013 | 10,686 | — |
| 2018 | 10,901 | +0.40% |
Source: INSEE

== See also ==
- Cantons of the Alpes-de-Haute-Provence department
- Communes of France
