= Montsalier =

- Commune
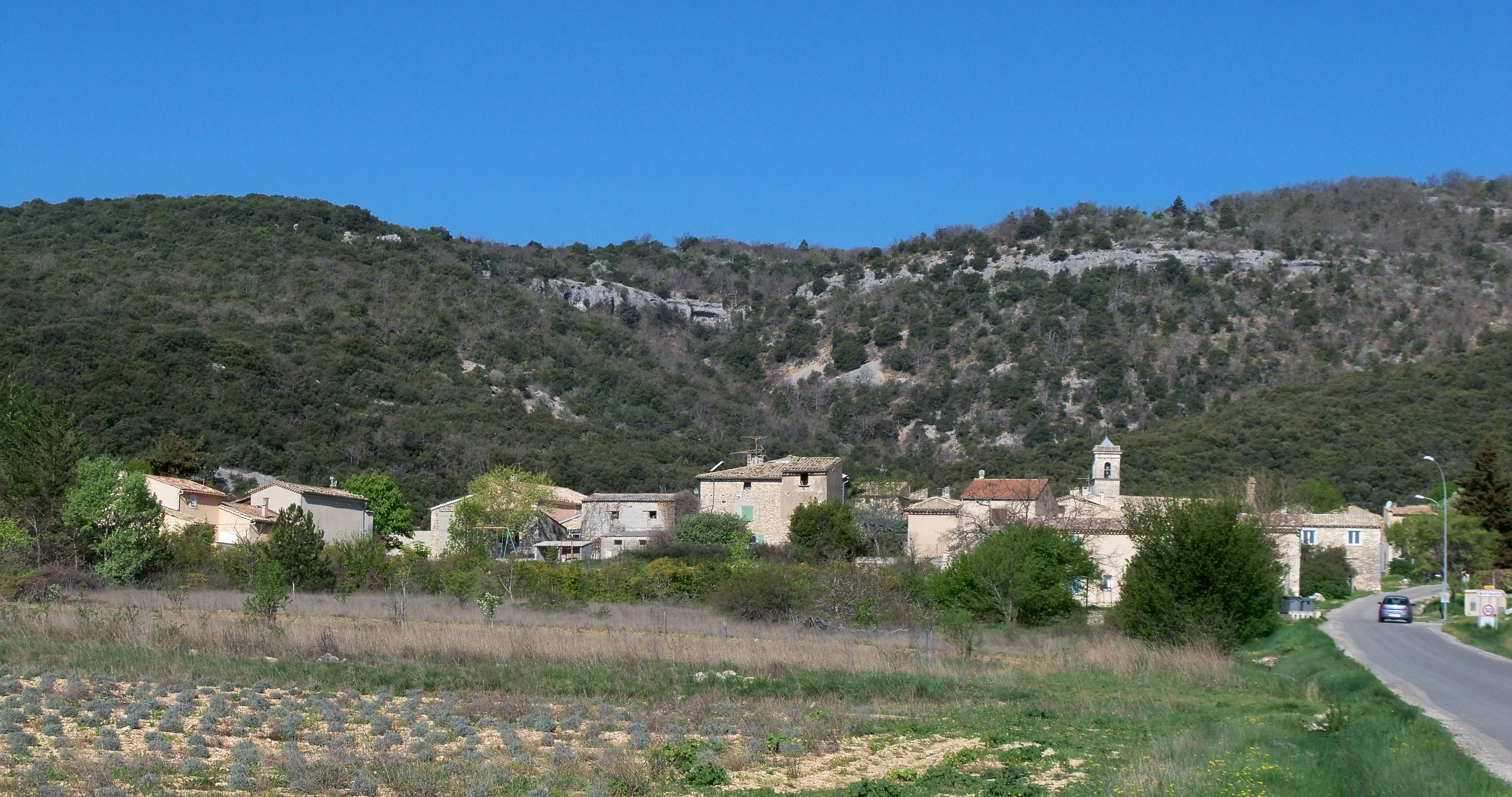
- A general view of the village of Montsalier

- Coat of arms
- Location of Montsalier
- Location within France Location within Provence-Alpes-Côte d'Azur
- Coordinates: 44°00′47″N 5°36′36″E
- Country: France
- Region: Provence-Alpes-Côte d'Azur
- Department: Alpes-de-Haute-Provence
- Arrondissement: Forcalquier
- Canton: Reillanne

Government
  - Mayor (2026–32): Serge Martin
- Area^{1}: 23.81 km^{2} (9.19 sq mi)
- Elevation: 630 m (2,070 ft)
- Highest elevation: 963 m (3,159 ft)
- Lowest elevation: 570 m (1,870 ft)
- Population (2023): 167
  - Density: 7.01/km^{2} (18.2/sq mi)
- Time zone: UTC+01:00 (CET)
  - Summer (DST): UTC+02:00 (CEST)
- INSEE/Postal code: 04132 /04150
- ^{1} French Land Register data, which excludes lakes, ponds, glaciers > 1 km^{2} (0.386 sq mi or 247 acres) and river estuaries.

Montsalier (French pronunciation: [mɔ̃salje]) is a commune in the Alpes-de-Haute-Provence department in southeastern France.

== Population ==
Historical population
Year	Pop.	±% p.a.
1968	65	—
1975	54	−2.61%
1982	66	+2.91%
1990	74	+1.44%
1999	92	+2.45%
2007	104	+1.54%
2012	111	+1.31%
2017	139	+4.60%
2023	167	+3.11%
Source: INSEE

== See also ==
- Communes of the Alpes-de-Haute-Provence department
