= La Rochegiron =

- Commune
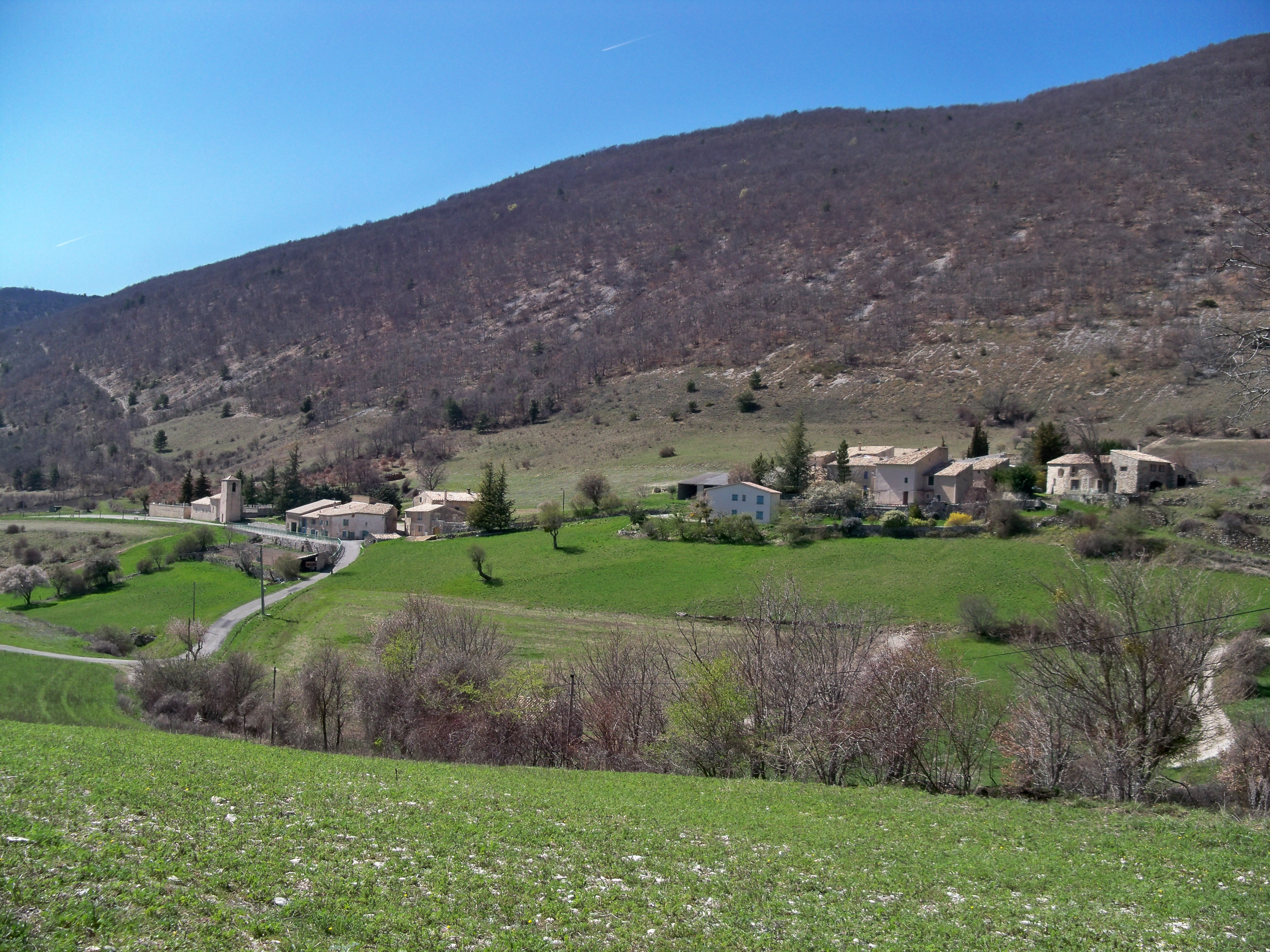
- Village of Jonquet

- Coat of arms
- Location of La Rochegiron
- Location within France Location within Provence-Alpes-Côte d'Azur
- Coordinates: 44°04′41″N 5°39′22″E
- Country: France
- Region: Provence-Alpes-Côte d'Azur
- Department: Alpes-de-Haute-Provence
- Arrondissement: Forcalquier
- Canton: Reillanne

Government
  - Mayor (2026–32): Claude Pellissier
- Area^{1}: 30.11 km^{2} (11.63 sq mi)
- Elevation: 800 m (2,600 ft)
- Highest elevation: 1,533 m (5,030 ft)
- Lowest elevation: 760 m (2,490 ft)
- Population (2023): 109
  - Density: 3.62/km^{2} (9.38/sq mi)
- Time zone: UTC+01:00 (CET)
  - Summer (DST): UTC+02:00 (CEST)
- INSEE/Postal code: 04169 /04150
- ^{1} French Land Register data, which excludes lakes, ponds, glaciers > 1 km^{2} (0.386 sq mi or 247 acres) and river estuaries.

La Rochegiron (French pronunciation: [la ʁɔʃʒiʁɔ̃]; Occitan: La Ròchagiron) is a commune in the Alpes-de-Haute-Provence department in southeastern France.

== Population ==
Historical population
Year	Pop.	±% p.a.
1968	68	—
1975	76	+1.60%
1982	92	+2.77%
1990	94	+0.27%
1999	92	−0.24%
2007	106	+1.79%
2012	97	−1.76%
2017	100	+0.61%
2023	109	+1.45%
Source: INSEE

== See also ==
- Communes of the Alpes-de-Haute-Provence department
