= Saumane, Alpes-de-Haute-Provence =

Saumane
- Commune
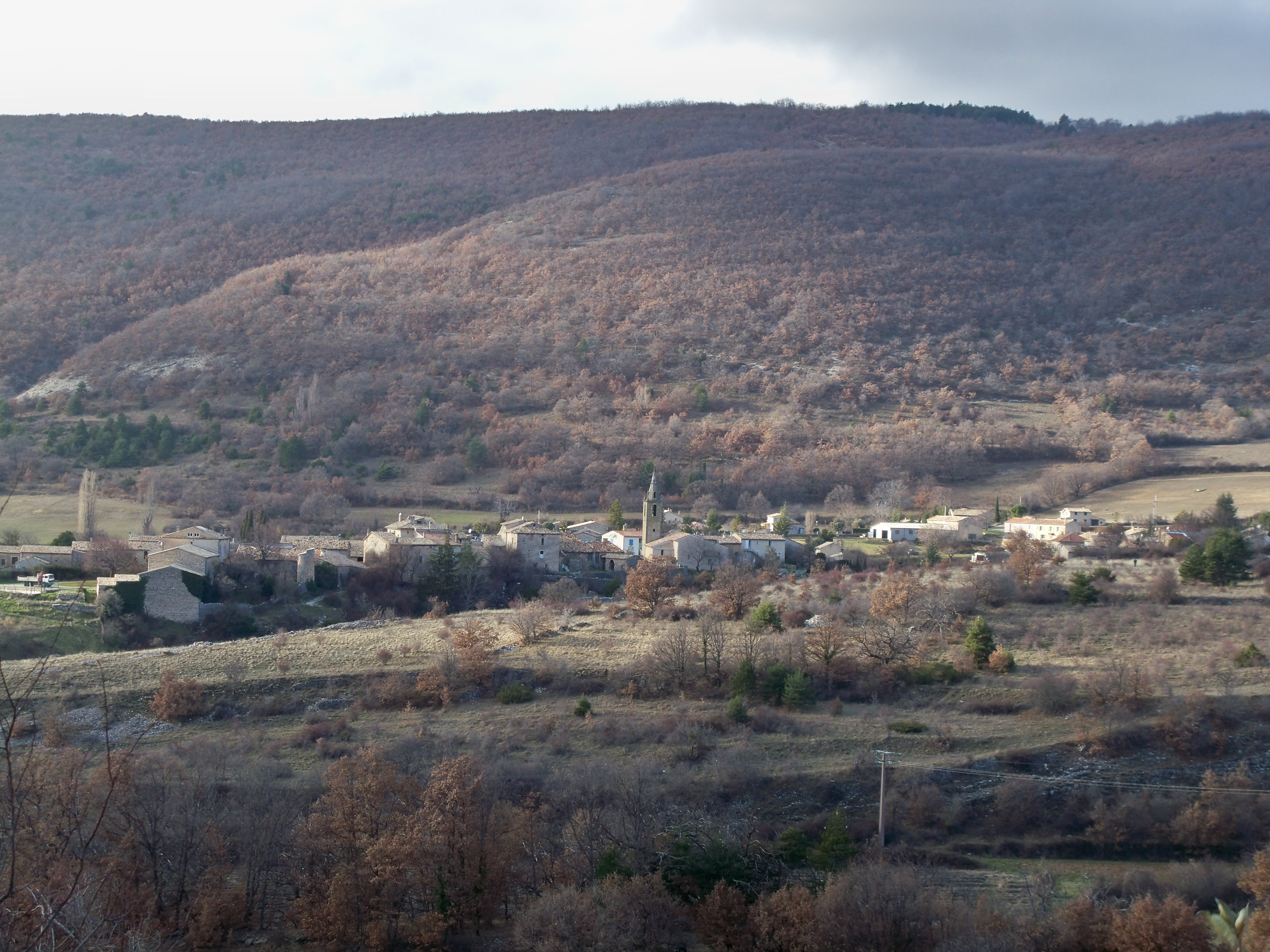
- A general view of the village of Saumane

- Coat of arms
- Location of Saumane
- Location within France Location within Provence-Alpes-Côte d'Azur
- Coordinates: 44°05′29″N 5°41′28″E
- Country: France
- Region: Provence-Alpes-Côte d'Azur
- Department: Alpes-de-Haute-Provence
- Arrondissement: Forcalquier
- Canton: Reillanne
- Intercommunality: Haute-Provence-Pays de Banon

Government
  - Mayor (2026–32): Fabrice Paul
- Area^{1}: 3.21 km^{2} (1.24 sq mi)
- Elevation: 820 m (2,690 ft)
- Highest elevation: 980 m (3,220 ft)
- Lowest elevation: 746 m (2,448 ft)
- Population (2023): 130
  - Density: 40/km^{2} (100/sq mi)
- Time zone: UTC+01:00 (CET)
  - Summer (DST): UTC+02:00 (CEST)
- INSEE/Postal code: 04201 /04150
- ^{1} French Land Register data, which excludes lakes, ponds, glaciers > 1 km^{2} (0.386 sq mi or 247 acres) and river estuaries.

Saumane (French pronunciation: [soman]; Occitan: Saumana) is a commune in the Alpes-de-Haute-Provence department in southeastern France.

== Population ==
Historical population
Year	Pop.	±% p.a.
1968	74	—
1975	63	−2.27%
1982	60	−0.69%
1990	80	+3.66%
1999	83	+0.41%
2007	103	+2.74%
2012	109	+1.14%
2017	118	+1.60%
2023	130	+1.63%
Source: INSEE

== See also ==
- Communes of the Alpes-de-Haute-Provence department
