= Revest-des-Brousses =

- Commune
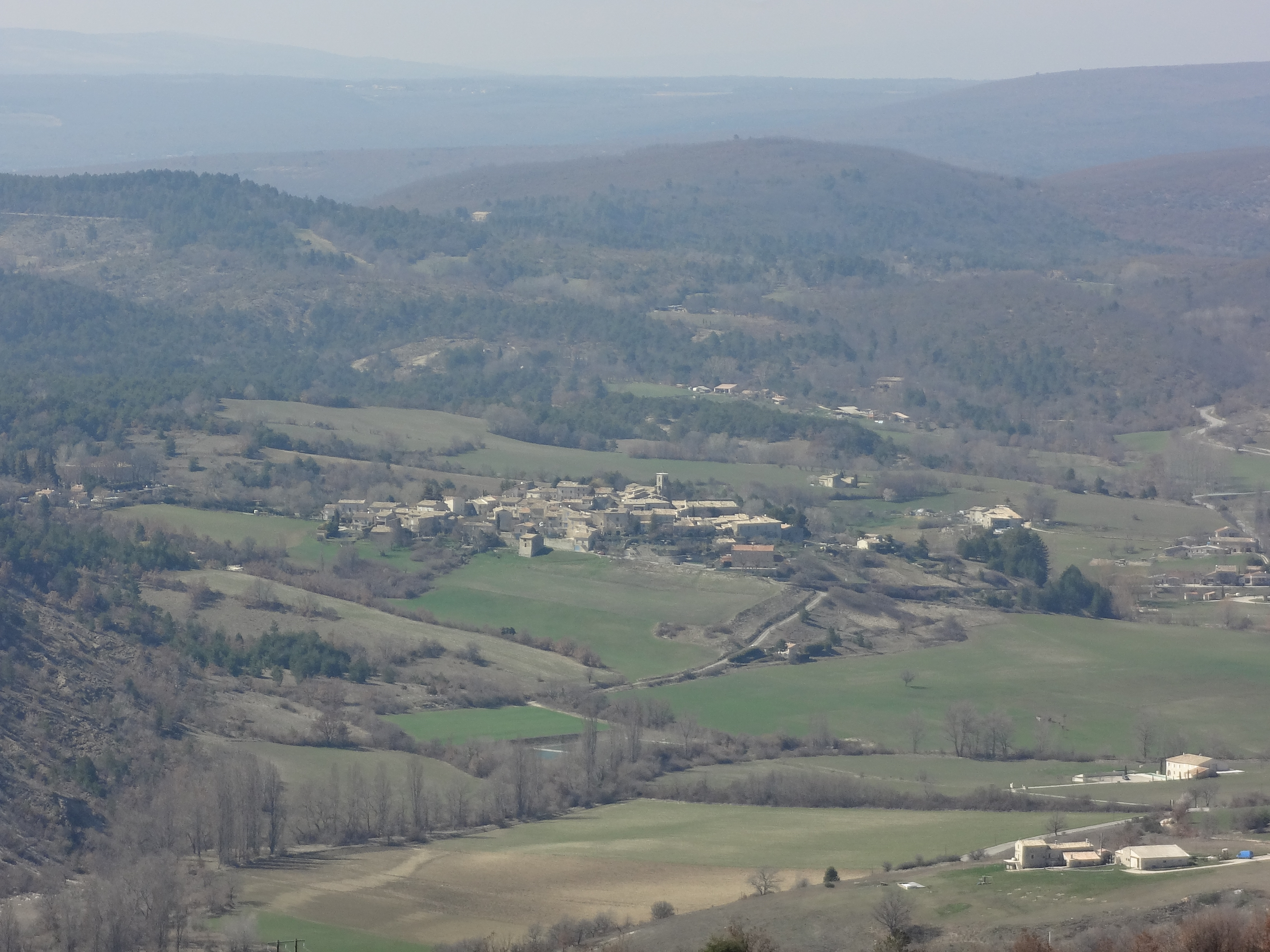
- A general view of the village of Revest-des-Brousses

- Coat of arms
- Location of Revest-des-Brousses
- Location within France Location within Provence-Alpes-Côte d'Azur
- Coordinates: 43°58′22″N 5°40′21″E
- Country: France
- Region: Provence-Alpes-Côte d'Azur
- Department: Alpes-de-Haute-Provence
- Arrondissement: Forcalquier
- Canton: Reillanne
- Intercommunality: Haute-Provence-Pays de Banon

Government
  - Mayor (2026–32): Muriel Garau
- Area^{1}: 22.95 km^{2} (8.86 sq mi)
- Elevation: 620 m (2,030 ft)
- Highest elevation: 868 m (2,848 ft)
- Lowest elevation: 515 m (1,690 ft)
- Population (2023): 267
  - Density: 11.6/km^{2} (30.1/sq mi)
- Time zone: UTC+01:00 (CET)
  - Summer (DST): UTC+02:00 (CEST)
- INSEE/Postal code: 04162 /04150
- ^{1} French Land Register data, which excludes lakes, ponds, glaciers > 1 km^{2} (0.386 sq mi or 247 acres) and river estuaries.

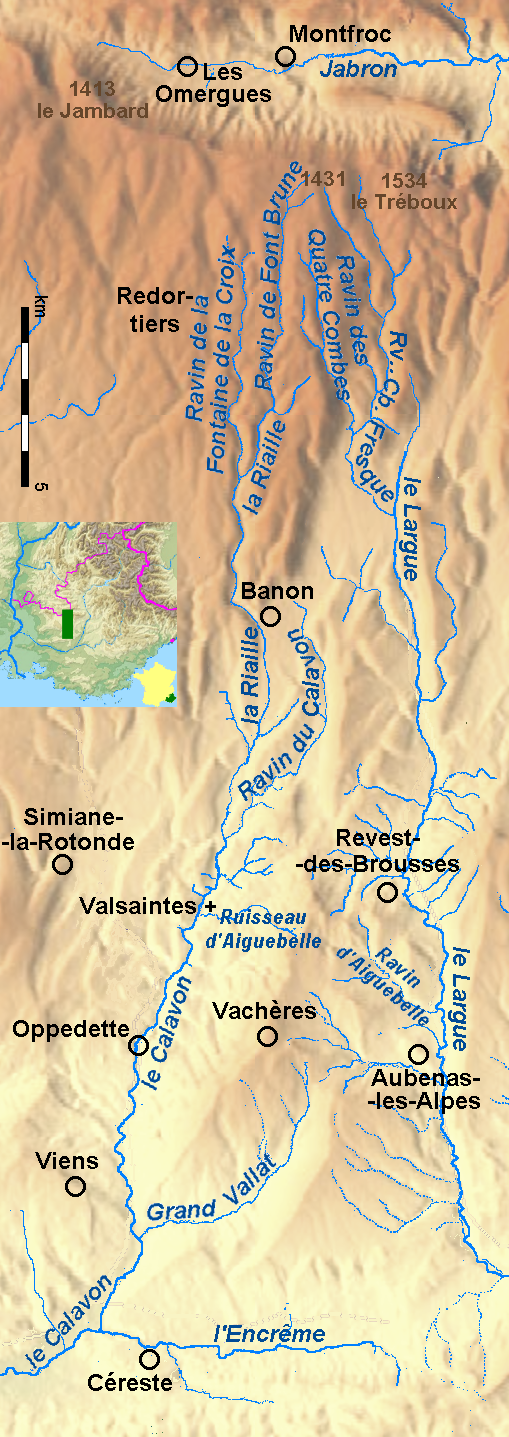
Location on the upper course of the river Largue

Revest-des-Brousses is a commune in the Alpes-de-Haute-Provence department in southeastern France.

== Population ==
Historical population
Year	Pop.	±% p.a.
1968	162	—
1975	139	−2.16%
1982	149	+1.00%
1990	151	+0.17%
1999	200	+3.17%
2007	245	+2.57%
2012	272	+2.11%
2017	268	−0.30%
2023	267	−0.06%
Source: INSEE

== See also ==
- Luberon
- Communes of the Alpes-de-Haute-Provence department
