= Canton of Saint-Étienne-les-Orgues =

Coordinates: 44°02′48″N 5°46′52″E

Saint-Étienne-les-Orgues
- Former canton
- Interactive map of Saint-Étienne-les-Orgues
- Country: France
- Region: Provence-Alpes-Côte d'Azur
- Department: Alpes-de-Haute-Provence
- No. of communes: {{{nbcomm}}}
- Disbanded: 2015
- Area: 201.63 km^{2} (77.85 sq mi)
- Population (2012): 2,930
  - Density: 14.5/km^{2} (37.6/sq mi)

The canton of Saint-Étienne-les-Orgues is a former administrative division in southeastern France. It was disbanded following the French canton reorganisation which came into effect in March 2015. It consisted of 8 communes, which joined the canton of Forcalquier in 2015. It had 2,930 inhabitants (2012).

The canton comprised the following communes:

- Cruis
- Fontienne
- Lardiers
- Mallefougasse-Augès
- Montlaux
- Ongles
- Revest-Saint-Martin
- Saint-Étienne-les-Orgues

== Demographics ==
Historical population Canton of Saint-Étienne-les-Orgues
Year	1962	1968	1975	1982	1990	1999
Pop.	1,113	1,231	1,271	1,536	2,202	2,294
±%	—	+10.6%	+3.2%	+20.8%	+43.4%	+4.2%
From the year 1962 on: No double counting – residents of multiple communes (e.g. students and military personnel) are counted only once. Source: INSEE

== See also ==
- Cantons of the Alpes-de-Haute-Provence department
