= Village perché =

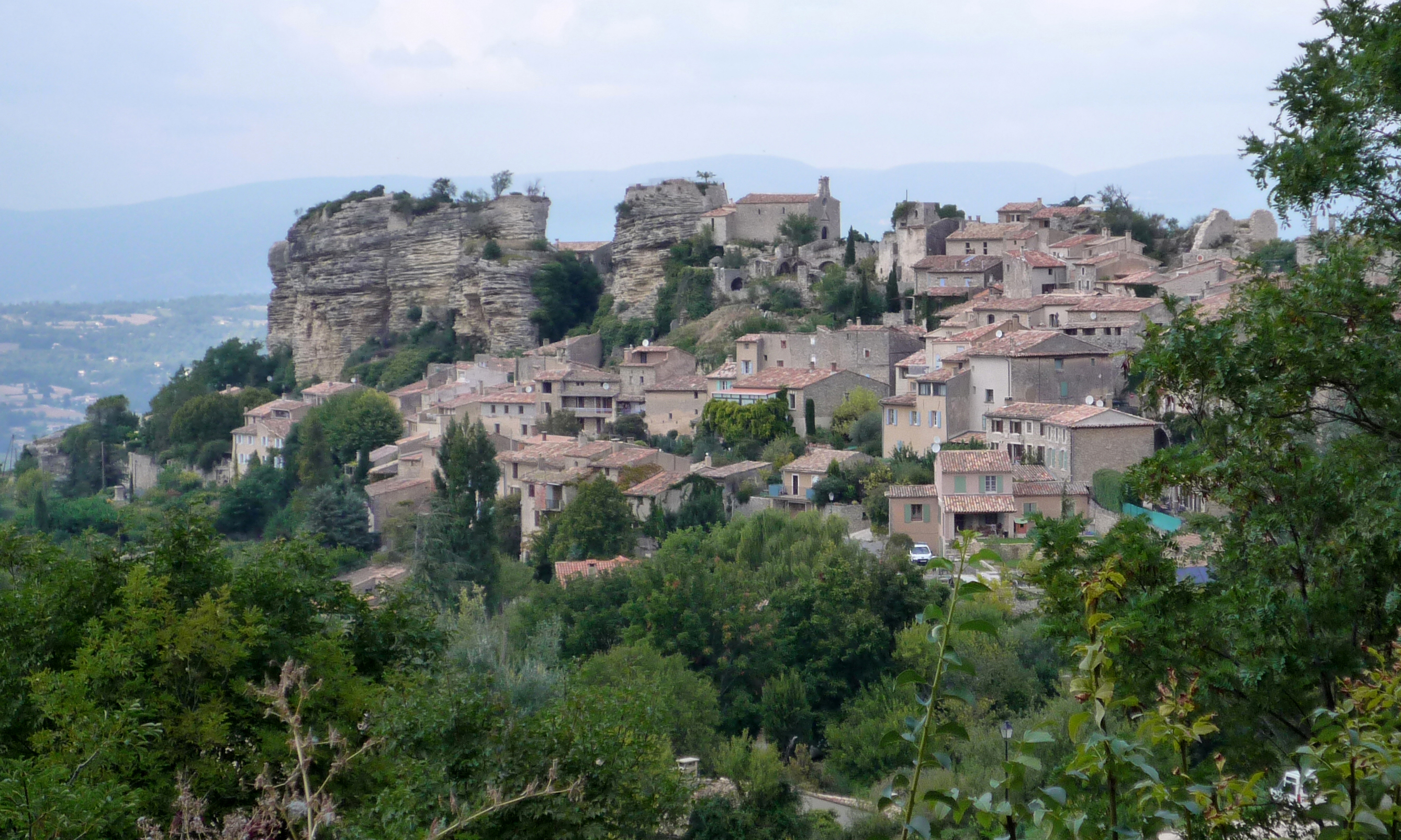
Saignon, village perché

A village perché is a village perched at the top of a relief, most commonly found in France. Naturally difficult to access, often with ramparts, 'villages perchés' are for the most part fortified settlements dating from the Middle Ages. Many are located in the south-east of France in the present Provence-Alpes-Côte d'Azur region, this type of habitat considered typical of Provence. The villages, situated on their "rocky acropolis", have retained their medieval appearance, from the orientation of the facades of their houses - towards the valley or the road of communication - a true front of fortification. Fernand Benoit emphasizes their occasional prehistoric origin by pointing out that Cicero, in reference to the Ligurians who inhabited the region, called them castellani, inhabitants of the castellas (Brutus, LXXIII, 256).

== Location ==
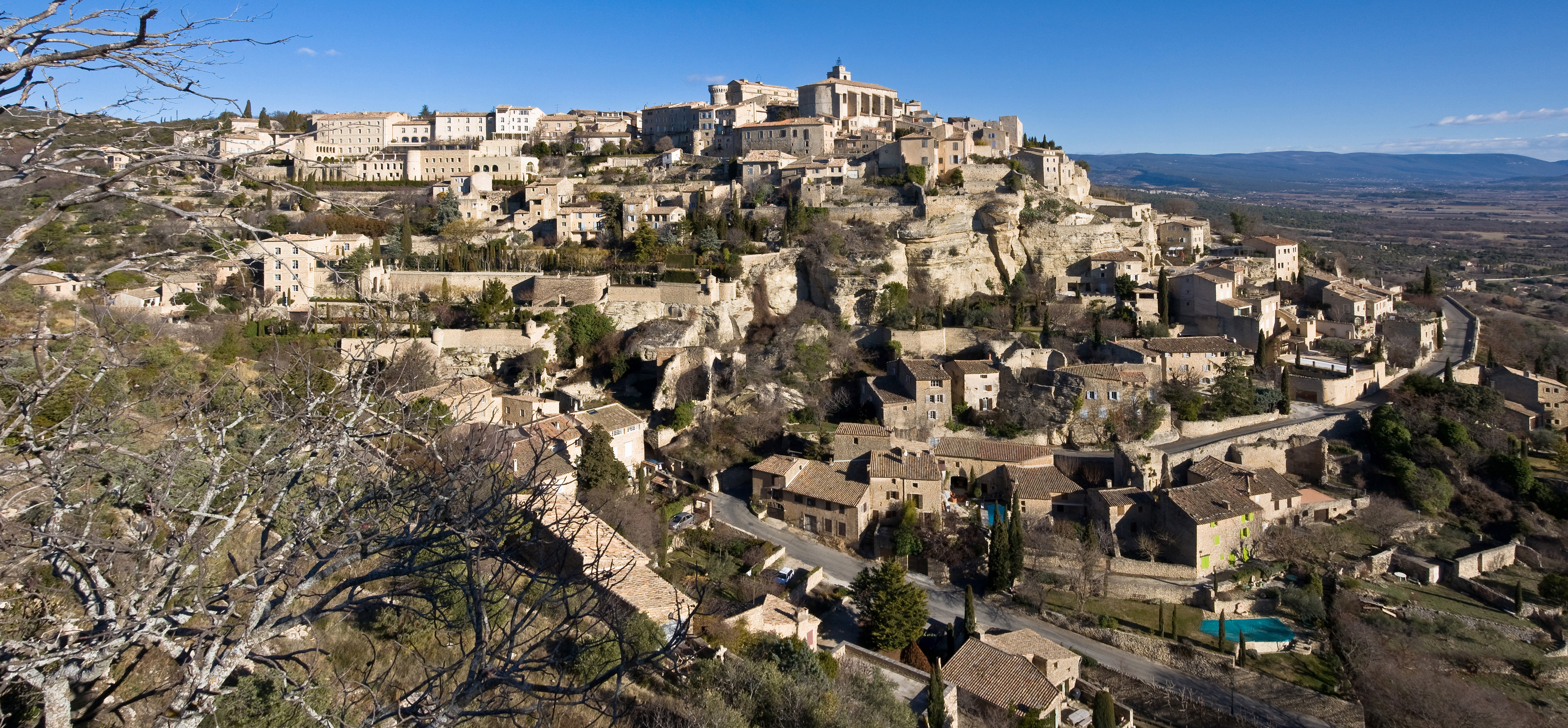
Gordes

'Villages perchés' are found mainly in hilly areas where soil is poor and water scarce. This is generally case in Provence except in the lower Rhone valley and in the Durance valley, where alluvial land abounds and water is easily accessible from a well dug in the courtyard of the house. Moreover, this grouping in a community closed in on itself corresponds to regions of small properties, where the only fertile lands are situated at the bottom of a few valleys, and this aggregation has facilitated the existence of rural handicraft indispensable to the villagers. Conversely, the dispersed habitat implies larger, wealthier estates, hence the aphorism penned by Fernand Benoit: "Poverty concentrates the habitat, wealth disperses it".

== House type ==
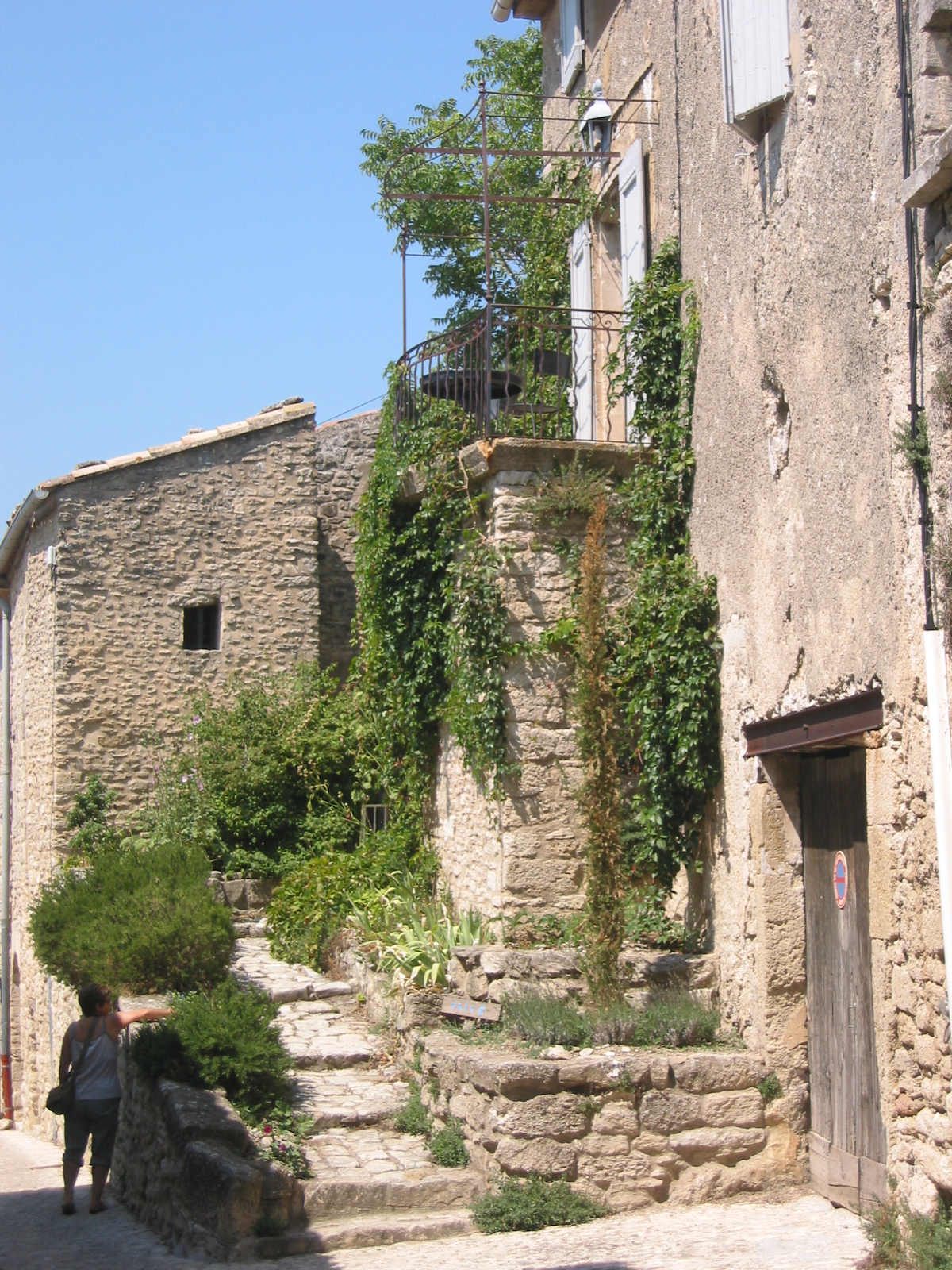
A house at Bonnieux

There is a specific habitat type that is linked to the village perché: the 'high house'. Benoit explains that "its originality consists in placing the beasts below, man above." The building is subdivided into a barn on the ground floor, housing on one or two floors, and an attic. It was the type of house reserved for the peasant villagers who had little livestock to accommodate. It is still found today in a number of mountainous massifs of western Provence, including the Alps valleys of Bléone and Haut Verdon, in the mountain of Lure where it is common in Banon, Cruis, Saint-Étienne-les-Orgues and Sigonce. Most of these houses date from the 16th century, when the religious wars forced the populace to hide behind the village fortifications. When the wars were over, there was a drift to the periphery of the agglomeration and "houses on land", more able to accommodate annexed buildings.

Indeed, this type of dwelling, gathering people and animals in a village, could only remain frozen in time, any extension being impossible except vertically. Their architecture is therefore characteristic: a narrow facade with one or two windows, and an elevation not exceeding four to five floors, including attic with its outer pulley to hoist the forage. Currently, the only possible transformations - these houses having lost their agricultural status - are to install a garage on the ground floor and create new rooms in the attic. For those houses restored with taste, the floor of the habitation is reached by a staircase joined to the facade. The presence of terrace or balcony was constant. The terrace was used primarily for the drying of fruit and vegetables suspended from a wire called a 'trihard' when forming a trellis that covered a rustic pergola. Where it formed a loggia, columns supporting a canopy covered with tiles, it was called a 'galarié' or 'soulerie'.

== Gallery ==
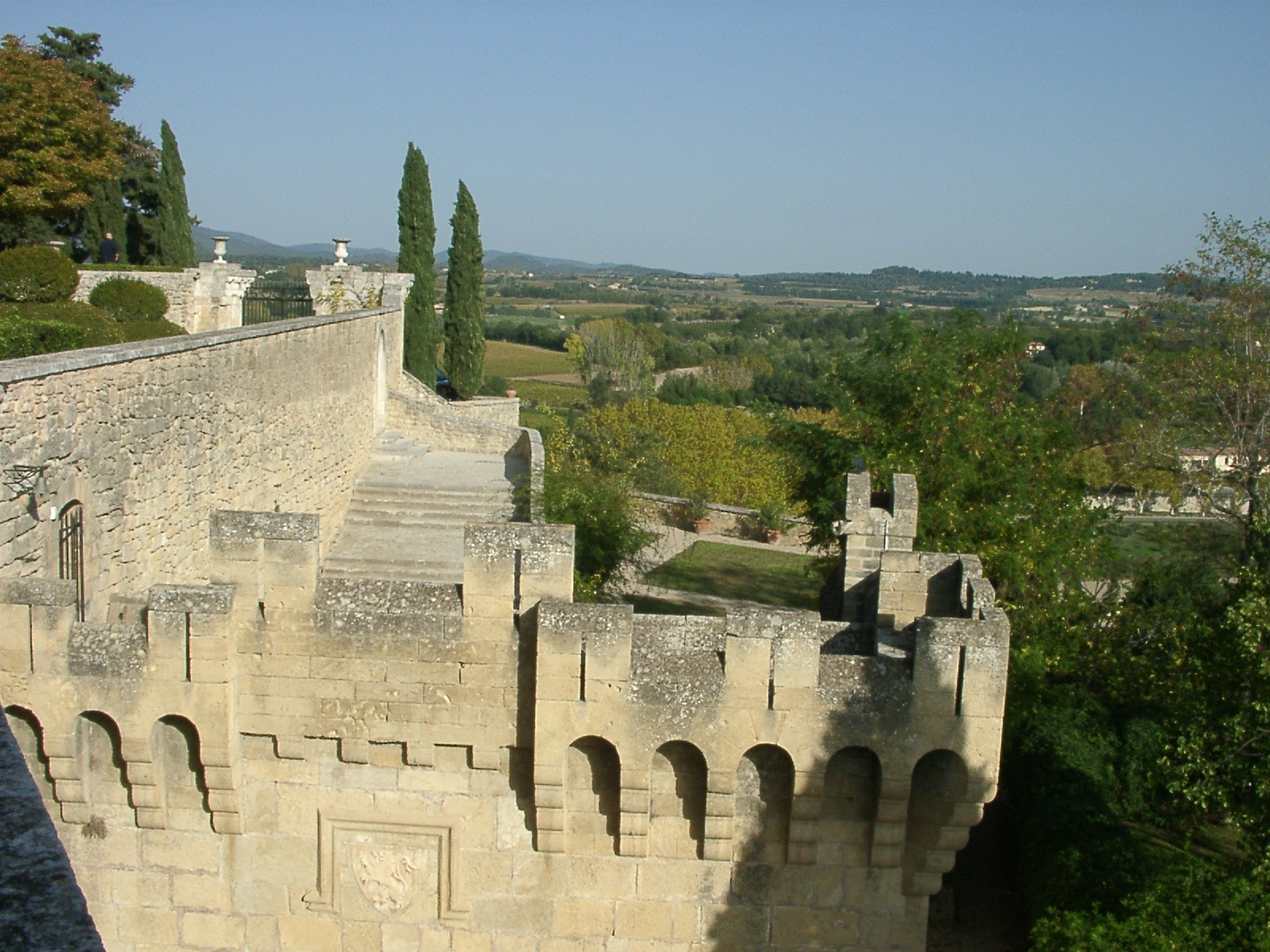
Ansouis.

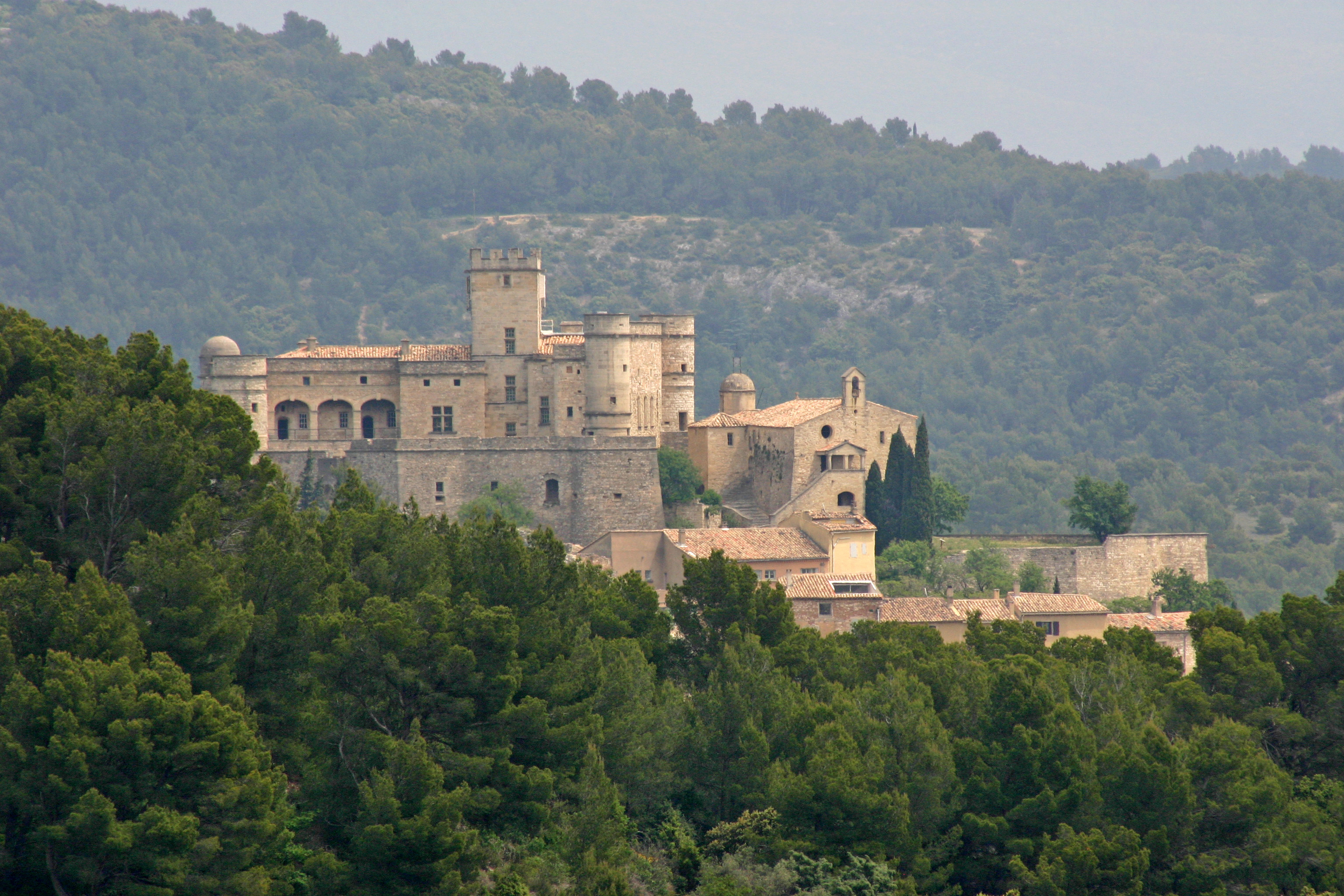
Le Barroux.

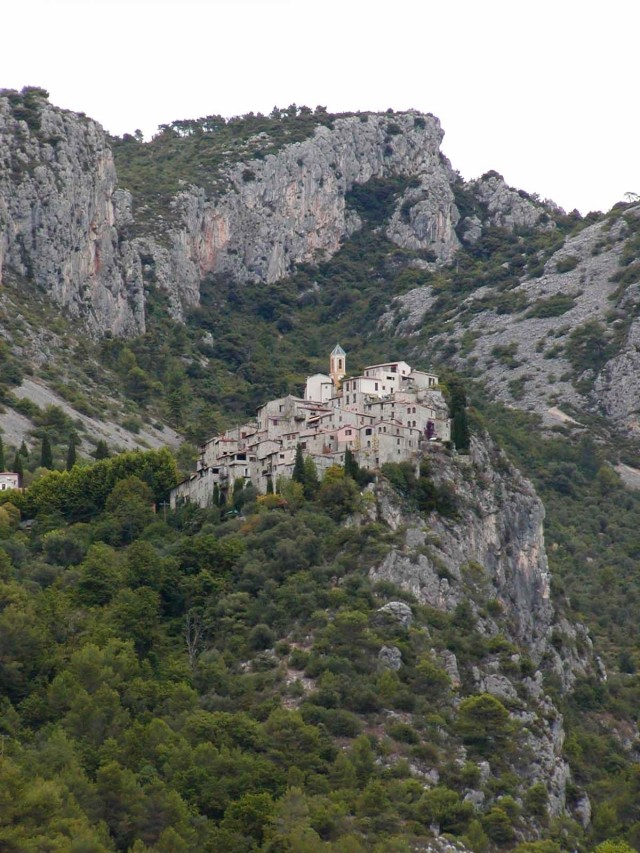
Peillon.

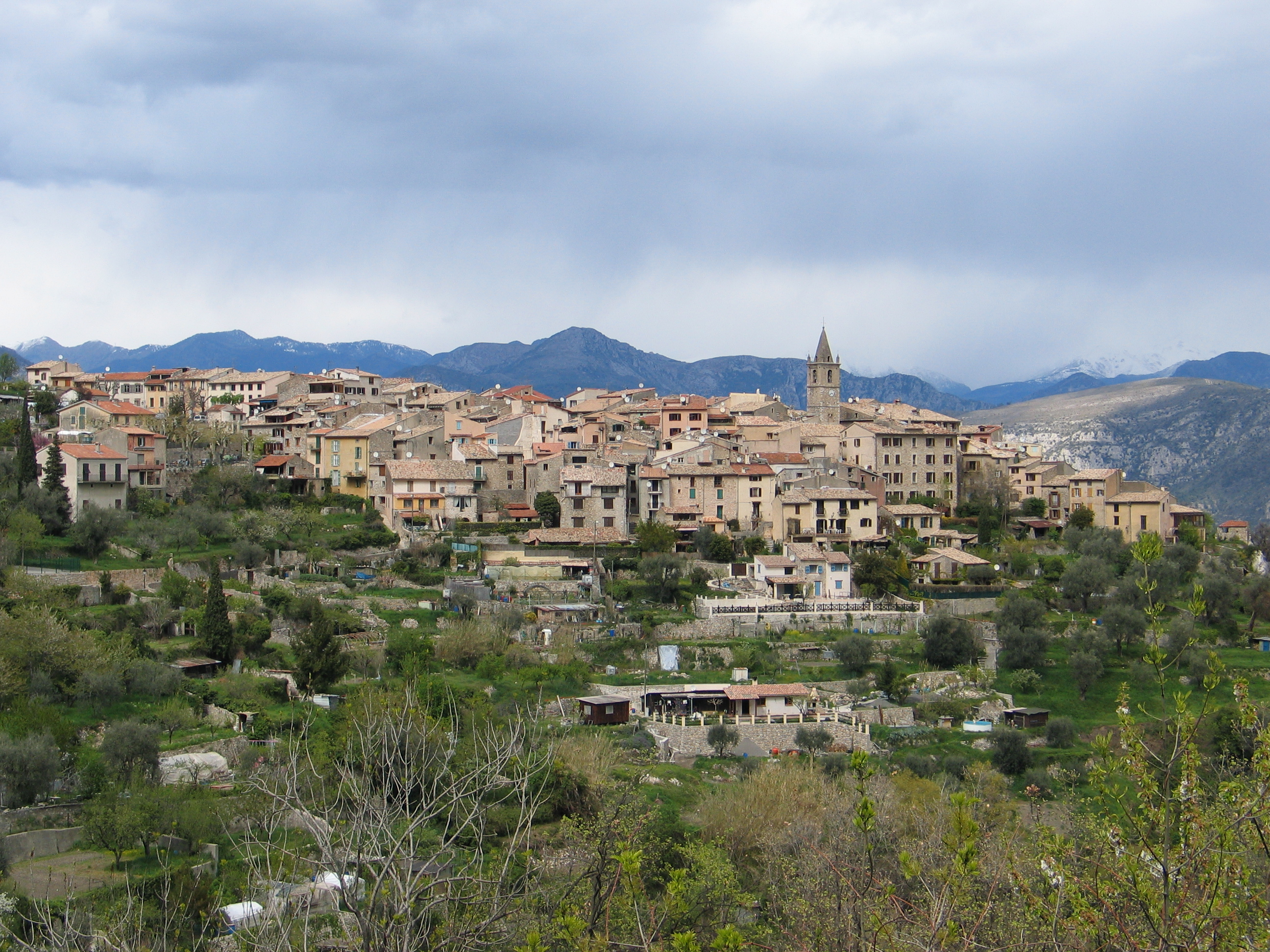
Le Broc.

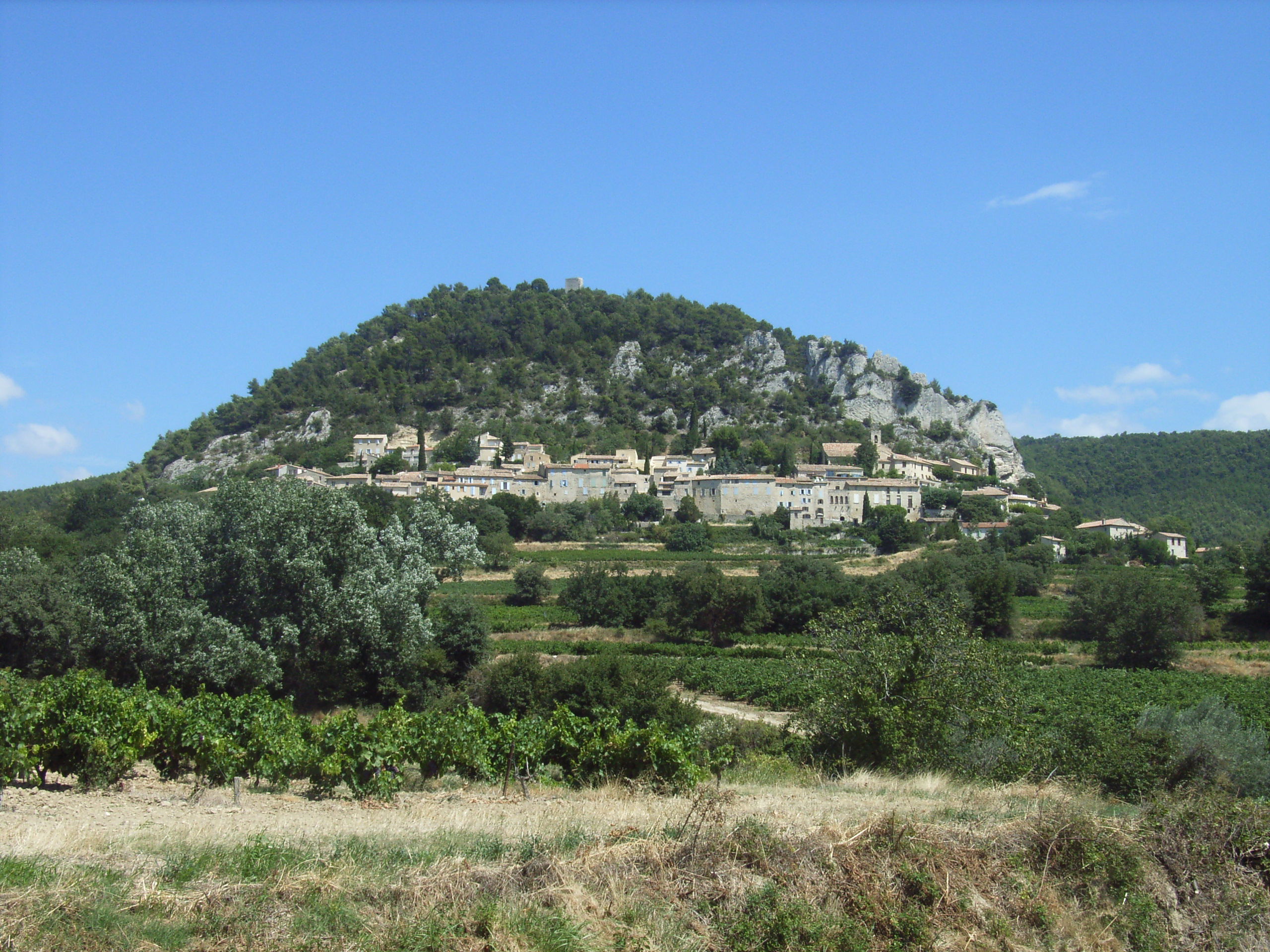
Séguret.
