= Pierrerue =

Pierrerue may refer to the following places in France:

- Pierrerue, Alpes-de-Haute-Provence, a commune in the Alpes-de-Haute-Provence department
- Pierrerue, Hérault, a commune in the Hérault department
