= Provence Honey =

Miel de Provence
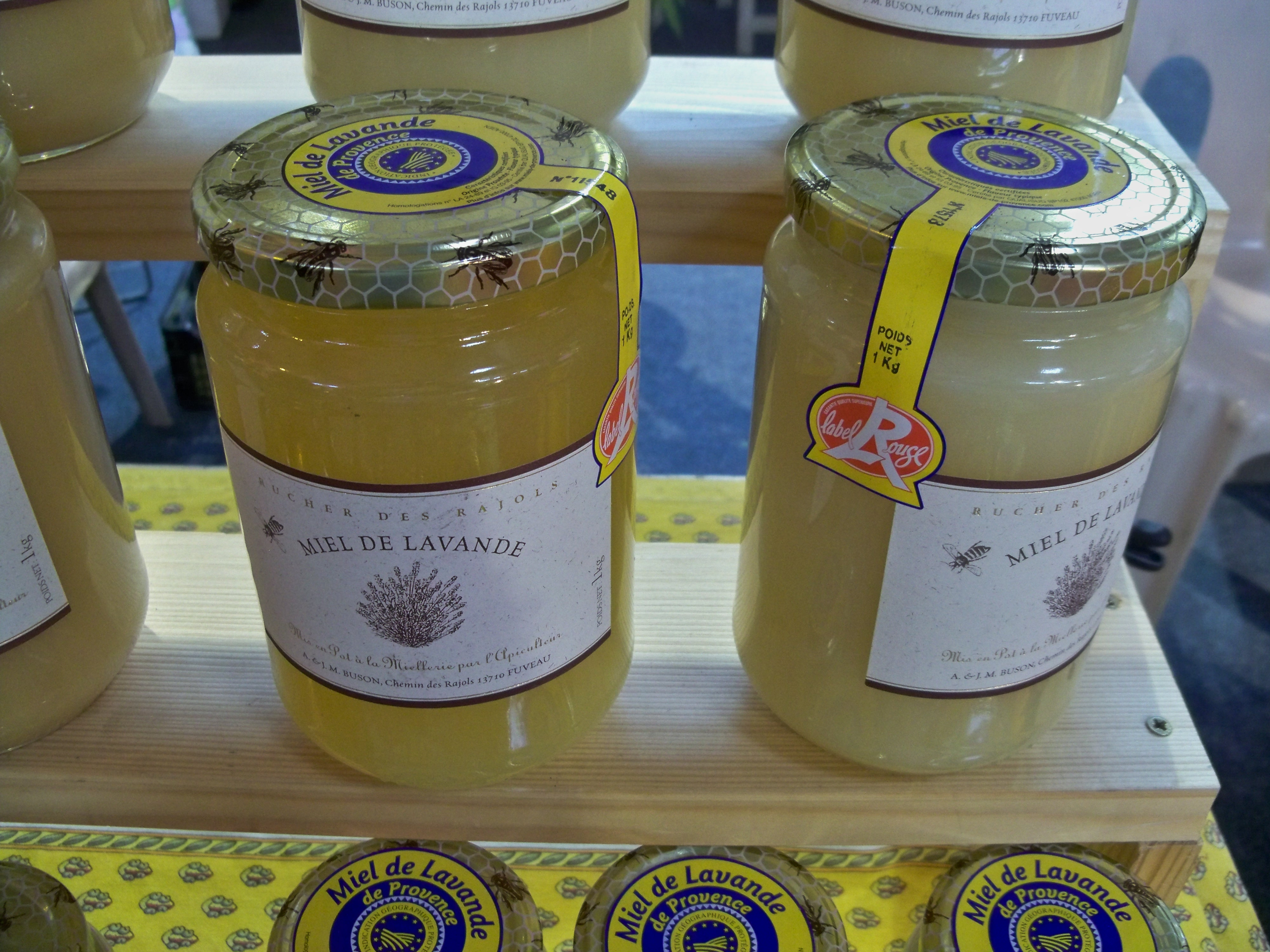
- Lavender honey IGP and Red Label at the Pertuis market
- Product type: Honey
- Country: France, Provence
- Registered as a trademark in: Red Label and Protected Geographical Indication
- Website: http://www.miels-de-provence.com

Miel de Provence (honey from Provence; Occitan: Mel de Provença) is protected by a Label Rouge (Red Label) associated to a protected geographical indication both for the all flowers honey and for the lavender and lavandin honey

== Labeling ==
From 14 November 2005, the IGP ("Protected Geographical Indication") "Miel de Provence" is recorded in the European range of IGPs and AOPs (Appellation d'Origine Protégée, meaning "Protected Designation Origin"). Ever since, the name "Provence", applied to honey, is protected and reserved for traders who comply with IGP specifications and/or the technical baseline quality sign which are associated with them. A decree signed on 30 July 2009, and relative to the Red Label award associated to a Protected Geographical Indication for Provence honey was published in the Journal Officiel (n°0195, 25 August 2009).

== Producers and production ==
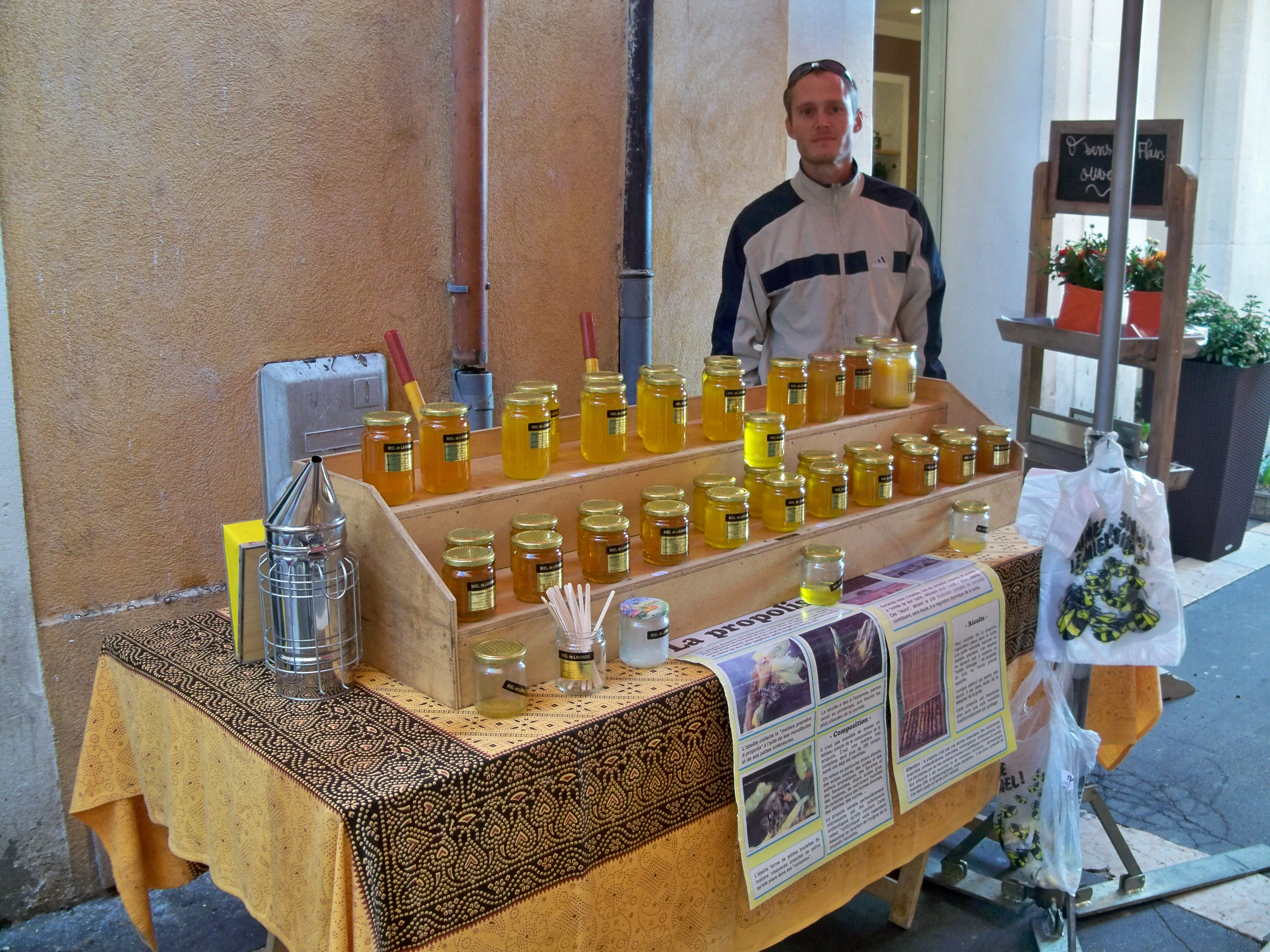
Denis Catalano's stand, beekeeper at the Apt market in Saint-Pierre street

Beekeeping brings together many producers. Some estimated 4500 whose 700 own between 70 and 150 beehives. The area numbers many professional beekeepers : more than 300 own at least 150 hives. Production in that area amounts to 2000 tons per year (this being 8% of the national production). Many of these beekeepers practice transhumance along a route going from the coastline towards Haute-Provence, across the Southern Alps. Some of them practice transhumance bringing their own beehives on the areas of production of acacia, chestnut and fir honey into the Rhône valley and beyond. In Provence, summer is the privileged season for lavender honey production, and hives are set up on an area limited in the North by the line Montélimar/Digne, and in the South by the Mont Ventoux, the plateau d'Albion, the mountain of Lure, the Vaucluse Mountains, and the Luberon. In the department of Alpes-de-Haute-Provence, lavender honey is produced in the Banon sector and on the plateau of Valensole. All flowers honey is elaborated on a wide area delimited by Nîmes, Montélimar, Gap, Digne, Nice, Toulon, Marseille and Avignon. But other great amounts of honey are produced by beekeepers in the guarrigue (rosemary and thyme honey), or in the maquis (heather and arbutus honey).

== A historical repute ==
Provence honey has earned its fame ever since the 15th century. It is then that it came to increase greatly in production, thanks to the request of Italian merchants, who considered it "the best of all good honeys". Its quality and prestige remain intact to the extent that it long withstood massive sugar consumption. It was during the 20th century that honey harvested in the areas of Grasse, Brignoles, Alpes provençales, the Mont Ventoux or Barcelonnette built its reputation for quality which enabled it to obtain the "IGP", in 2005. For example, in the mountain of Lure, the family apiary stems from a long tradition. It provided additional income, and was the only resource to sweeten.

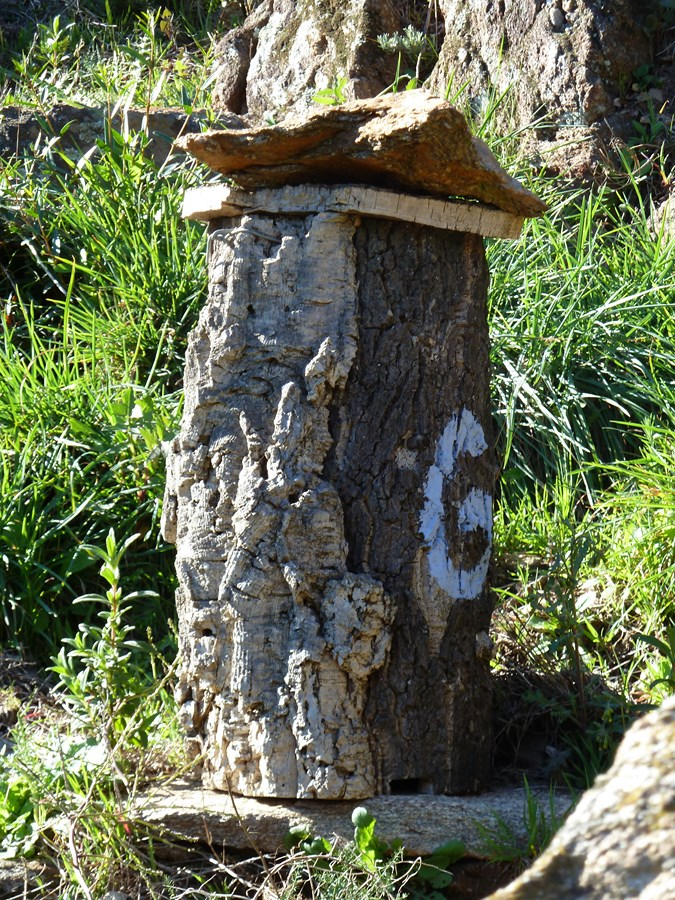
The brusc, first beehive built by beekeepers from Provence

Until the middle of the 20th century, beehives were built in hollow tree-trunks – the bruscs – and their number varied depending on the swarms harvested in spring, since each honey harvest killed the bees. The division of labor in each family was identical. The man was in charge of the brusc and also had to get the honey out, while the woman extracted these from the honeycombs, using the heat of the hearth. It was an all flowers honey, used to sweeten drinks, make cakes, cook nougat, candy fruits or achieve ointments. The Lure drug-merchants stirred beeswax and honey into their drug mixture. The wax was also used to polish furniture, its surplus sold to joiners and cabinet-makers, or to make candles or votive candles. Beekeeping evolved throughout the twenties with the cultivation of lavender and wild lavandin. Then the progressive "bruscs" were progressively replaced by beehives in the thirties and these were widely used for the following decade. From then on, transhumance of the beehives in the lavender fields had become one of the main features of Provençale beekeeping. Those displacements were initially made by local producers, thanks to a trailer harnessed to the coach linking Forcalquier to Banon and serving Lardiers, the Hospitalet and Saumane. This behaviour was adopted by beekeepers from the Vaucluse, who organized their hive displacements by carts to the Basses-Alpes

Beehives in Provence

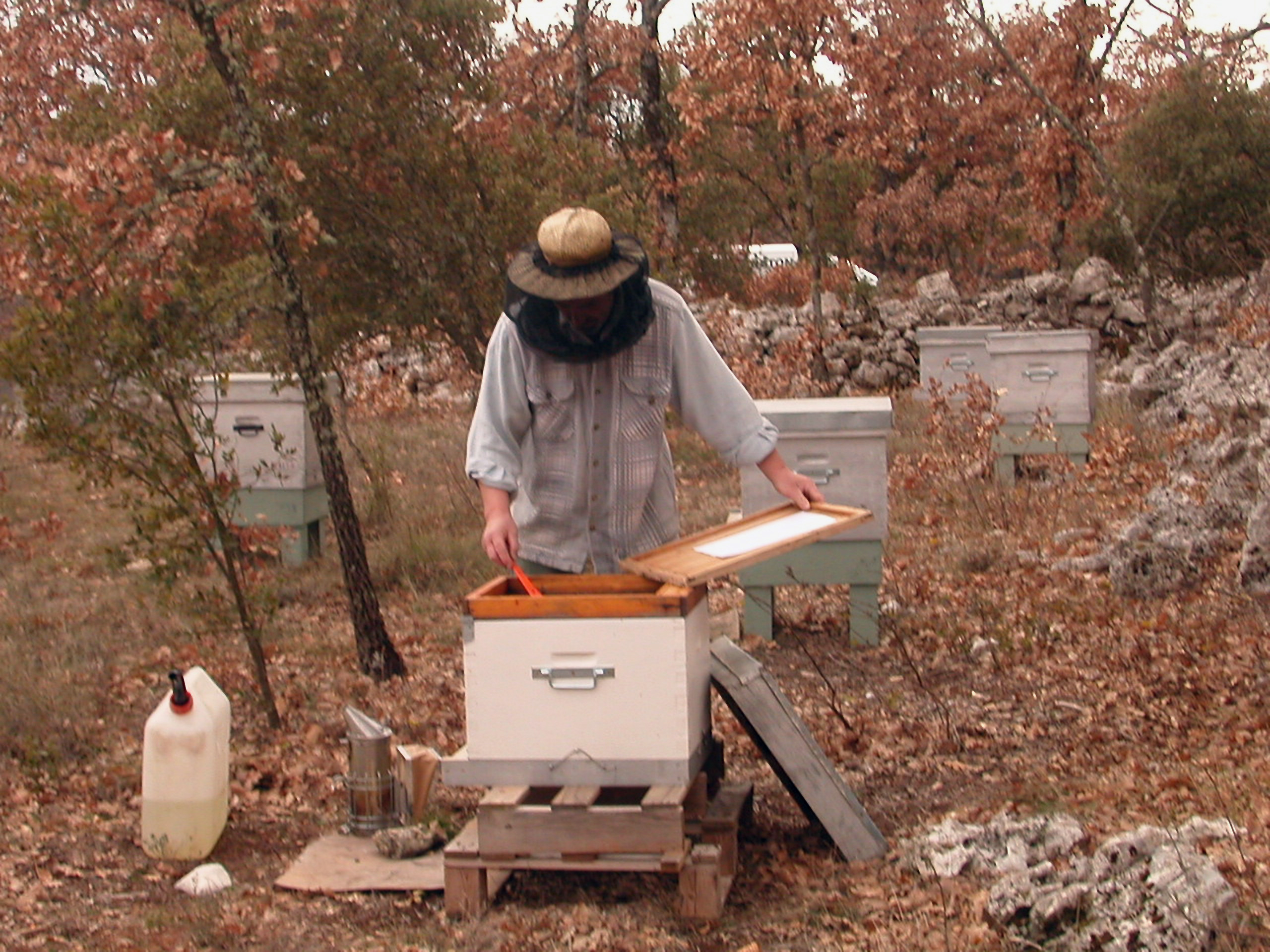
Winter feeding

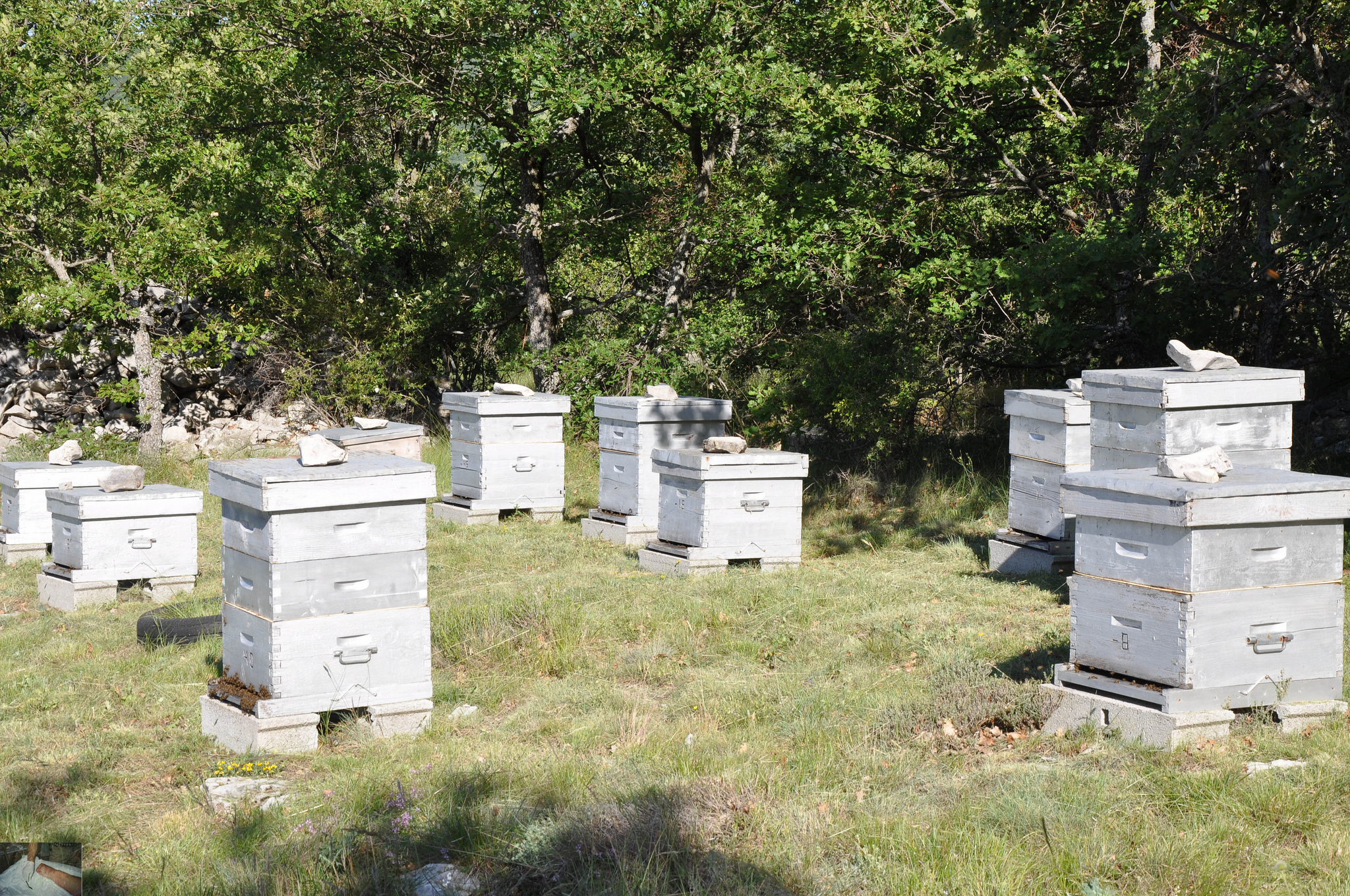
Beekeeping in the Alpes provençales

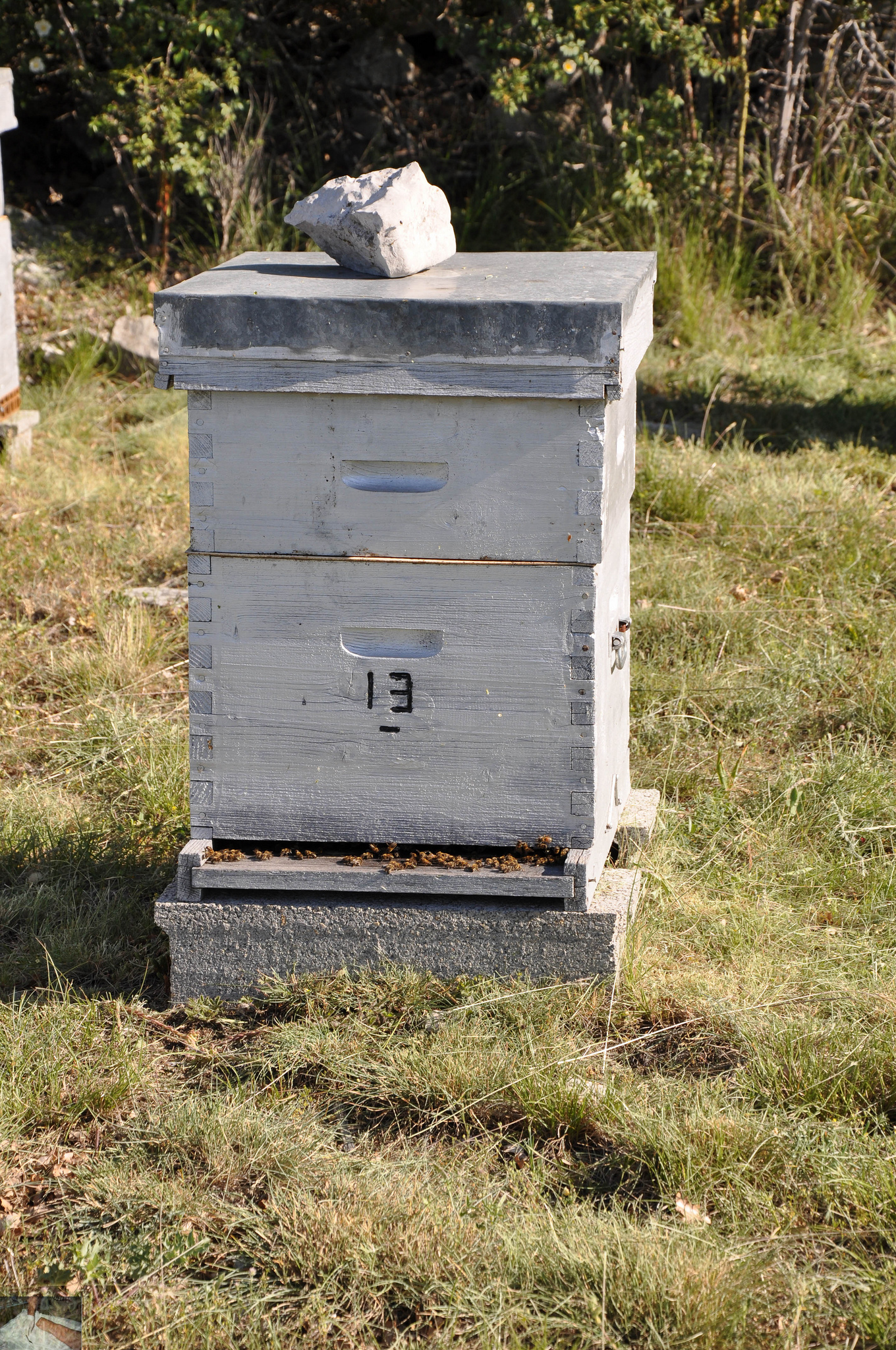
Beehive between Hospitalet and Lardiers

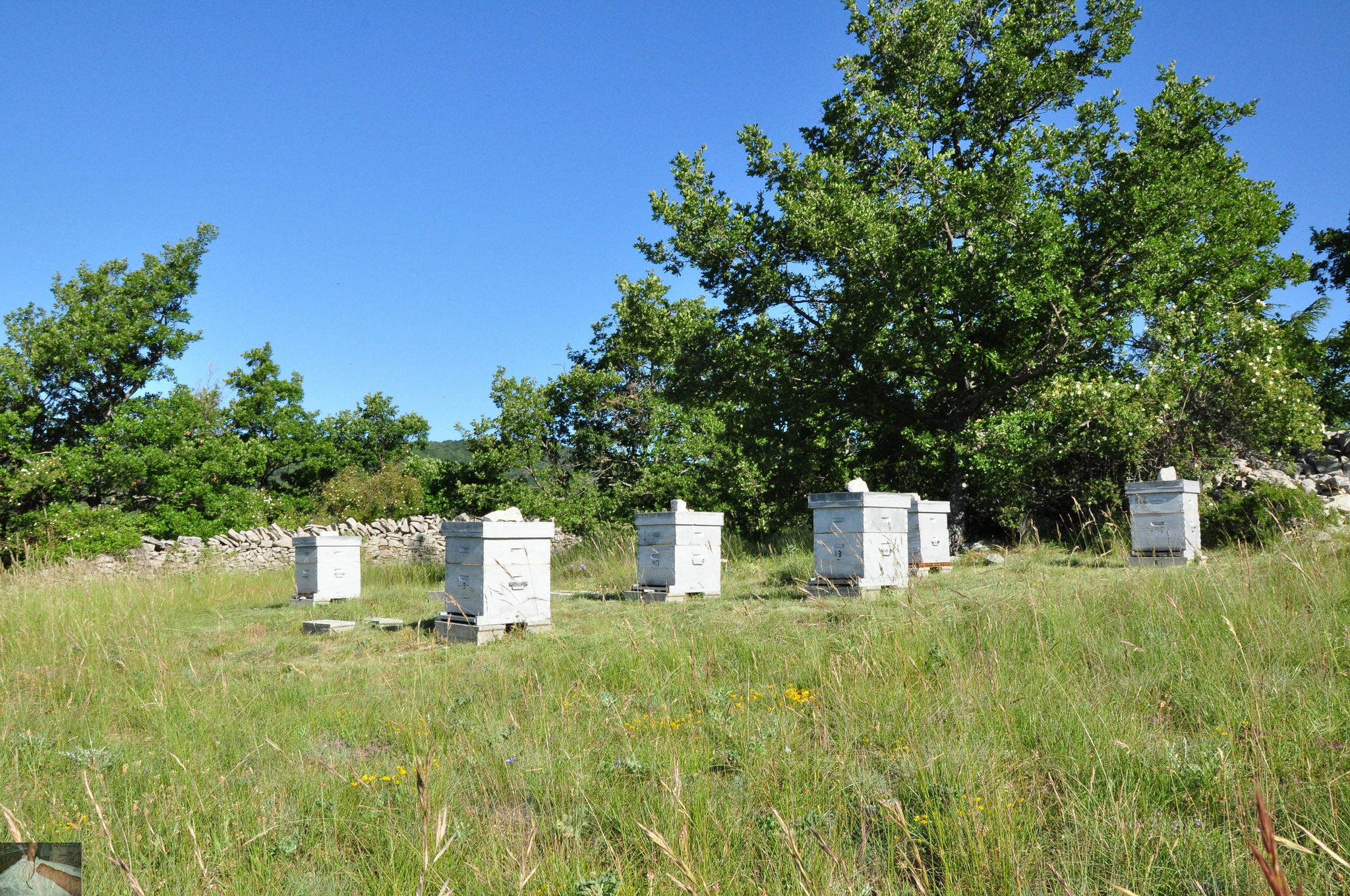
Beehives in Haute-Provence

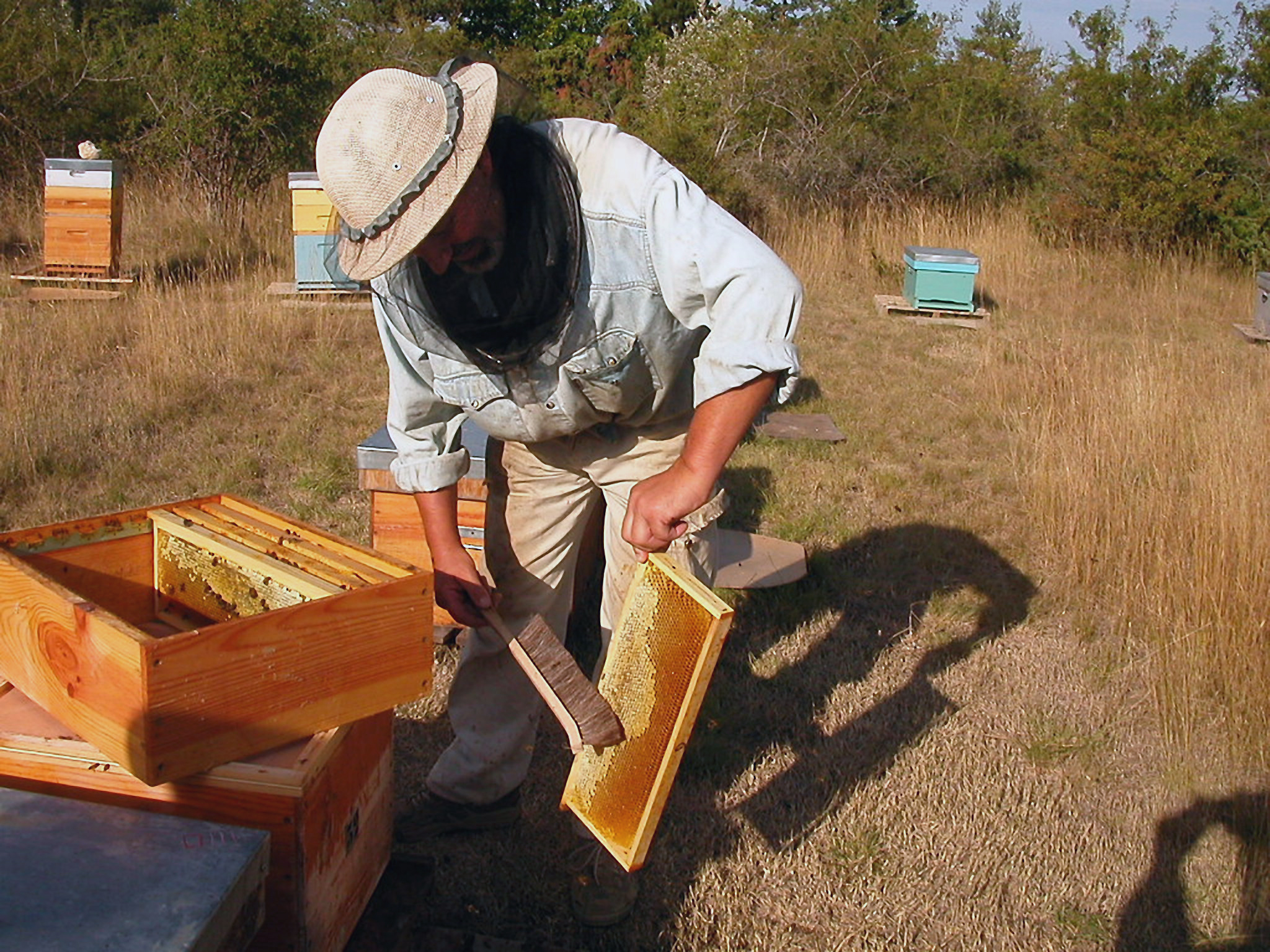
Beekeeper throughout the harvest

== See also ==
- Occitan Cuisine
- Honey
- Provence
- French cuisine
- Bee
- Agriculture
- Provençal markets

== Bibliography ==
- Inventaire du patrimoine culinaire de la France-Provence-Alpes-Côte d'Azur, Edition Albin Michel/CNAC, 1995, realized by the Conseil National des Arts Culinaires headed by Alain Senderens and mandated by the Ministries of Culture and Agriculture.
- La montagne de Lure, encyclopédie d'une montagne en Haute-Provence, by Guy Barruol, André de Réparaz and Jean-Yves Royer headed by Guy Barruol, edition Les Alpes de Lumière, June 2004. (ISBN 2-906162-70-1)
