= La Brillanne =

- Commune
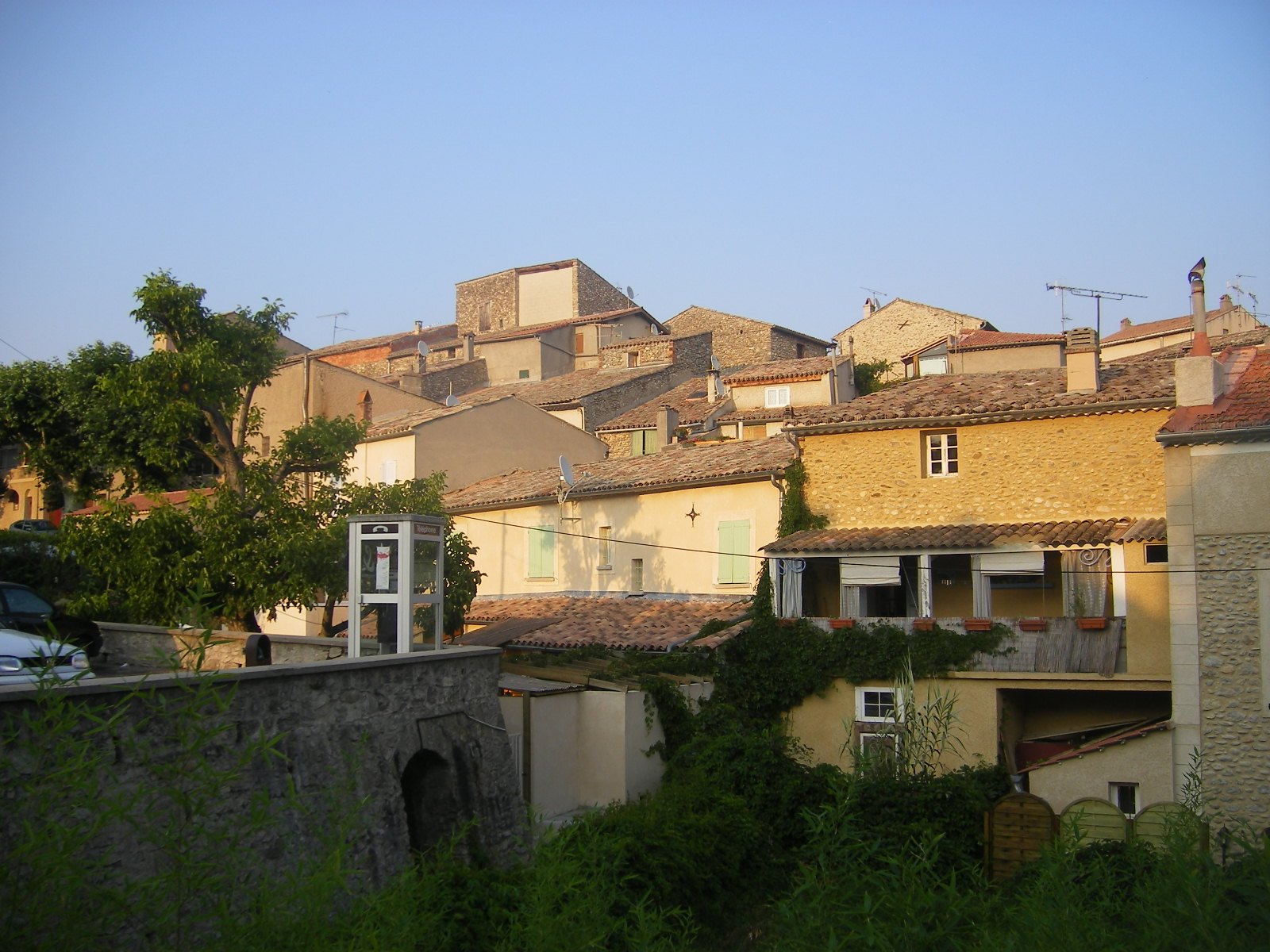
- Buildings in La Brillanne

- Coat of arms
- Location of La Brillanne
- Location within France Location within Provence-Alpes-Côte d'Azur
- Coordinates: 43°55′39″N 5°53′30″E
- Country: France
- Region: Provence-Alpes-Côte d'Azur
- Department: Alpes-de-Haute-Provence
- Arrondissement: Forcalquier
- Canton: Forcalquier
- Intercommunality: Durance-Luberon-Verdon Agglomération

Government
  - Mayor (2026–32): Jean-Charles Borghini
- Area^{1}: 7.22 km^{2} (2.79 sq mi)
- Elevation: 349 m (1,145 ft)
- Highest elevation: 520 m (1,710 ft)
- Lowest elevation: 332 m (1,089 ft)
- Population (2023): 1,121
  - Density: 155/km^{2} (402/sq mi)
- Time zone: UTC+01:00 (CET)
  - Summer (DST): UTC+02:00 (CEST)
- INSEE/Postal code: 04034 /04700
- ^{1} French Land Register data, which excludes lakes, ponds, glaciers > 1 km^{2} (0.386 sq mi or 247 acres) and river estuaries.

La Brillanne (French pronunciation: [la bʁijan]; Occitan: Labrilhana) is a commune in the department of Alpes-de-Haute-Provence in southeastern France.

== Population ==
Historical population
| Year | Pop. | ±% p.a. |
|---|---|---|
| 1968 | 521 | — |
| 1975 | 591 | +1.82% |
| 1982 | 573 | −0.44% |
| 1990 | 649 | +1.57% |
| 1999 | 765 | +1.84% |
| 2007 | 869 | +1.61% |
| 2012 | 1,027 | +3.40% |
| 2017 | 1,149 | +2.27% |
| 2023 | 1,121 | −0.41% |
Source: INSEE

Its inhabitants are referred to as Brillannais in French.

== See also ==
- Communes of the Alpes-de-Haute-Provence department
