= Limans =

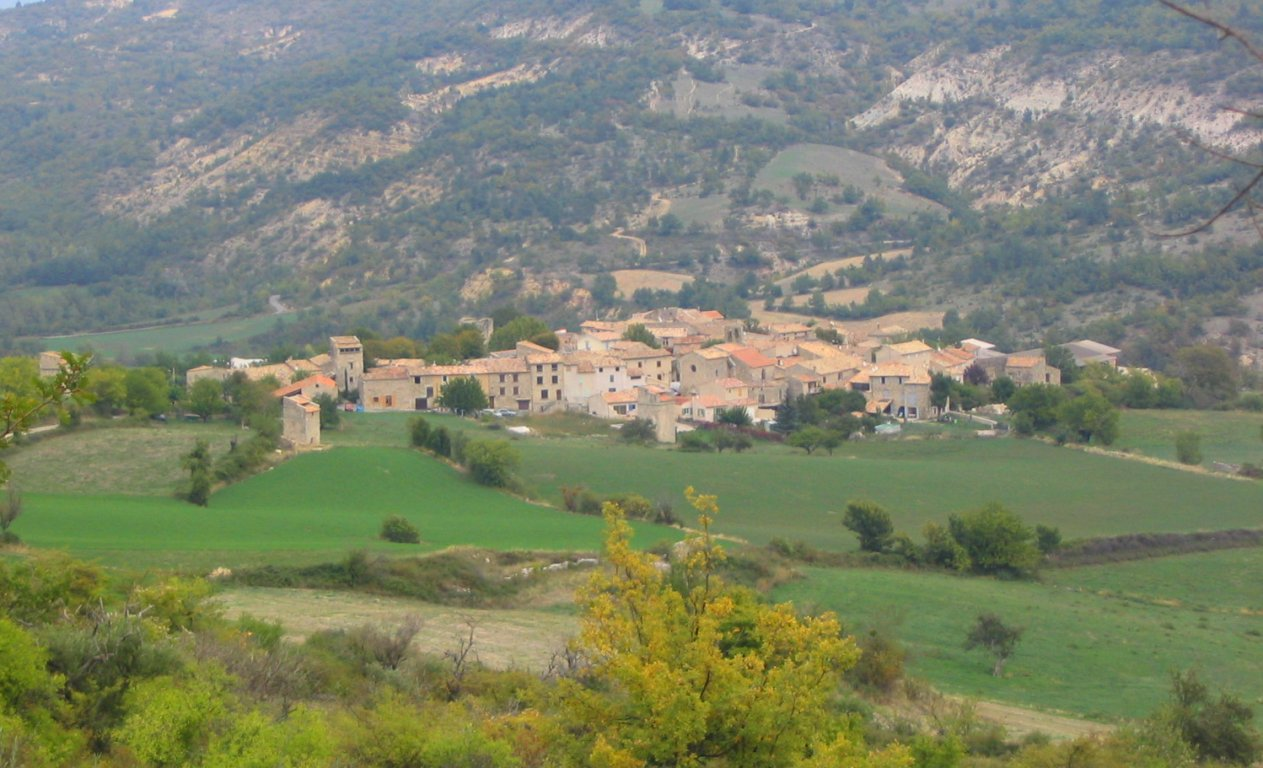
- A general view of the village of Limans

- Coat of arms
- Location of Limans
- Location within France Location within Provence-Alpes-Côte d'Azur
- Coordinates: 43°59′10″N 5°43′52″E
- Country: France
- Region: Provence-Alpes-Côte d'Azur
- Department: Alpes-de-Haute-Provence
- Arrondissement: Forcalquier
- Canton: Forcalquier
- Intercommunality: Pays de Forcalquier et Montagne de Lure

Government
  - Mayor (2026–32): Céline Mosteiro
- Area^{1}: 20.97 km^{2} (8.10 sq mi)
- Elevation: 320 m (1,050 ft)
- Highest elevation: 919 m (3,015 ft)
- Lowest elevation: 452 m (1,483 ft)
- Population (2023): 385
  - Density: 18.4/km^{2} (47.6/sq mi)
- Time zone: UTC+01:00 (CET)
  - Summer (DST): UTC+02:00 (CEST)
- INSEE/Postal code: 04104 /04300
- ^{1} French Land Register data, which excludes lakes, ponds, glaciers > 1 km^{2} (0.386 sq mi or 247 acres) and river estuaries.

Limans is a commune in the Alpes-de-Haute-Provence department in southeastern France.

== Population ==
Historical population
Year	Pop.	±% p.a.
1968	125	—
1975	156	+3.22%
1982	158	+0.18%
1990	253	+6.06%
1999	289	+1.49%
2007	332	+1.75%
2012	329	−0.18%
2017	369	+2.32%
2023	385	+0.71%
Source: INSEE

== See also ==
- Communes of the Alpes-de-Haute-Provence department
