= Label Rouge =

French quality label for agricultural products

Label Rouge

Label Rouge (Red Label) is a sign of quality assurance in France as defined by Law No. 2006-11 (5 January 2006).

Products eligible for the Label Rouge are food items, and non-food and unprocessed agricultural products such as flowers. According to the French Ministry of Agriculture: "The Red Label certifies that a product has a specific set of characteristics establishing a superior level to that of a similar current product".

== Certification ==
To obtain the Label Rouge, a very stringent set of standards prepared by a group of producers must be approved. These standards establish the criteria which the product must meet throughout the production chain, including farming techniques, feed, processing and distribution.

Approval is officially announced through a joint decree from the Minister for Agriculture and Fisheries and the Minister for Consumer Affairs, on the recommendations of the National Institute for Origin and Quality (INAO). INAO is the French public body responsible for quality and origin marks relating to food products.

== See also ==
- Provence honey
