= Revest-Saint-Martin =

- Commune
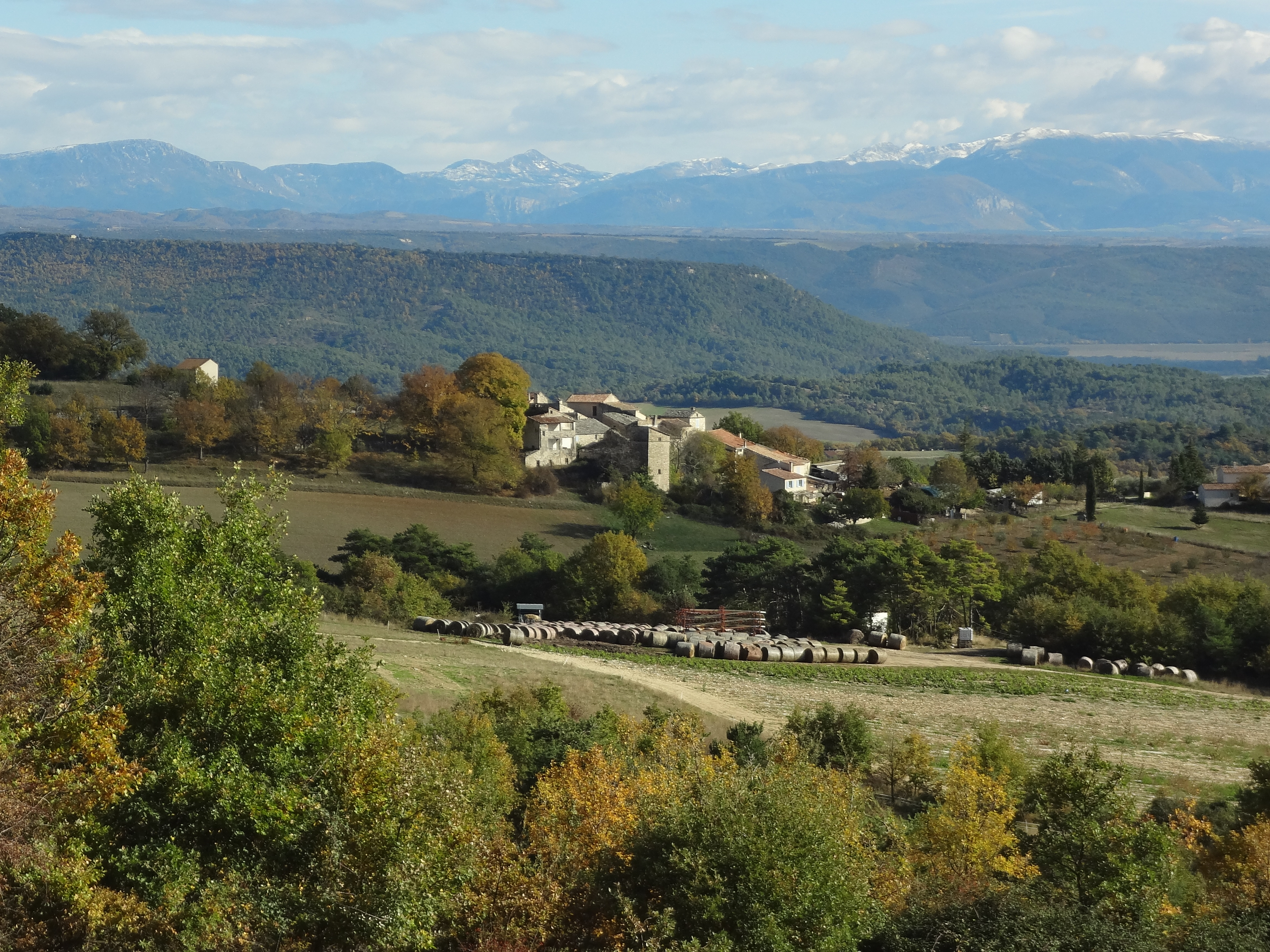
- A view of the hamlet of Saint-Martin and the surrounding area

- Coat of arms
- Location of Revest-Saint-Martin
- Location within France Location within Provence-Alpes-Côte d'Azur
- Coordinates: 44°00′43″N 5°49′38″E
- Country: France
- Region: Provence-Alpes-Côte d'Azur
- Department: Alpes-de-Haute-Provence
- Arrondissement: Forcalquier
- Canton: Forcalquier
- Intercommunality: Pays de Forcalquier et Montagne de Lure

Government
  - Mayor (2026–32): Nadine Curnier
- Area^{1}: 7.56 km^{2} (2.92 sq mi)
- Elevation: 658 m (2,159 ft)
- Highest elevation: 830 m (2,720 ft)
- Lowest elevation: 520 m (1,710 ft)
- Population (2023): 79
  - Density: 10/km^{2} (27/sq mi)
- Time zone: UTC+01:00 (CET)
  - Summer (DST): UTC+02:00 (CEST)
- INSEE/Postal code: 04164 /04230
- ^{1} French Land Register data, which excludes lakes, ponds, glaciers > 1 km^{2} (0.386 sq mi or 247 acres) and river estuaries.

Revest-Saint-Martin (Provençal: Revèst e Sant Martin) is a commune in the Alpes-de-Haute-Provence department in southeastern France.

== Population ==
Historical population
Year	Pop.	±% p.a.
1968	59	—
1975	71	+2.68%
1982	60	−2.38%
1990	77	+3.17%
1999	84	+0.97%
2007	90	+0.87%
2012	64	−6.59%
2017	85	+5.84%
2023	79	−1.21%
Source: INSEE

== See also ==
- Communes of the Alpes-de-Haute-Provence department
