= Sigonce =

- Commune
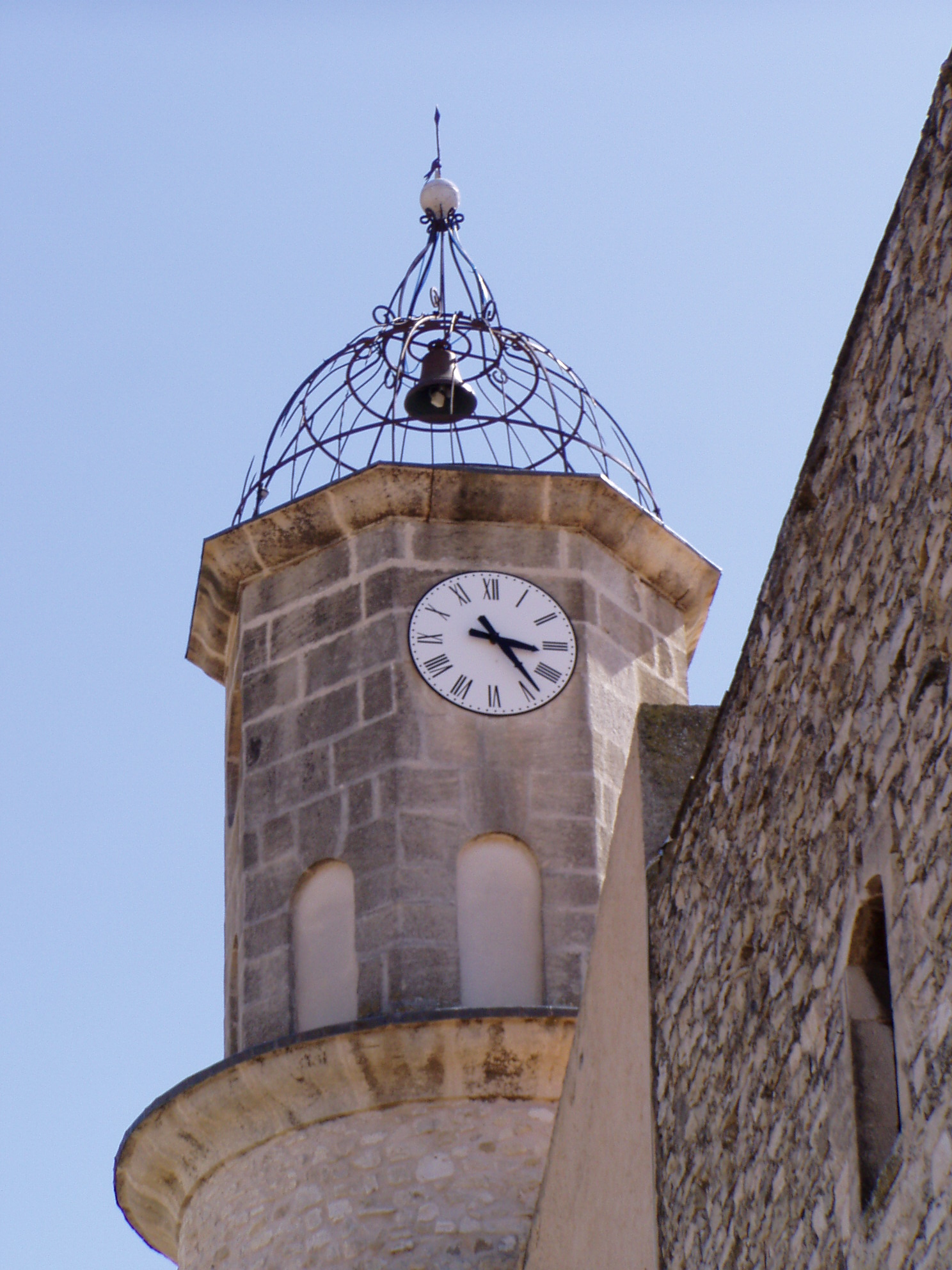
- Clock tower

- Coat of arms
- Location of Sigonce
- Location within France Location within Provence-Alpes-Côte d'Azur
- Coordinates: 43°59′52″N 5°50′28″E
- Country: France
- Region: Provence-Alpes-Côte d'Azur
- Department: Alpes-de-Haute-Provence
- Arrondissement: Forcalquier
- Canton: Forcalquier
- Intercommunality: Pays de Forcalquier et Montagne de Lure

Government
  - Mayor (2026–32): Christian Chiapella
- Area^{1}: 19.97 km^{2} (7.71 sq mi)
- Elevation: 470 m (1,540 ft)
- Highest elevation: 744 m (2,441 ft)
- Lowest elevation: 414 m (1,358 ft)
- Population (2023): 419
  - Density: 21.0/km^{2} (54.3/sq mi)
- Time zone: UTC+01:00 (CET)
  - Summer (DST): UTC+02:00 (CEST)
- INSEE/Postal code: 04206 /04300
- ^{1} French Land Register data, which excludes lakes, ponds, glaciers > 1 km^{2} (0.386 sq mi or 247 acres) and river estuaries.

Sigonce (French pronunciation: [siɡɔ̃s]; Occitan: Sigonça) is a commune in the Alpes-de-Haute-Provence department in southeastern France.

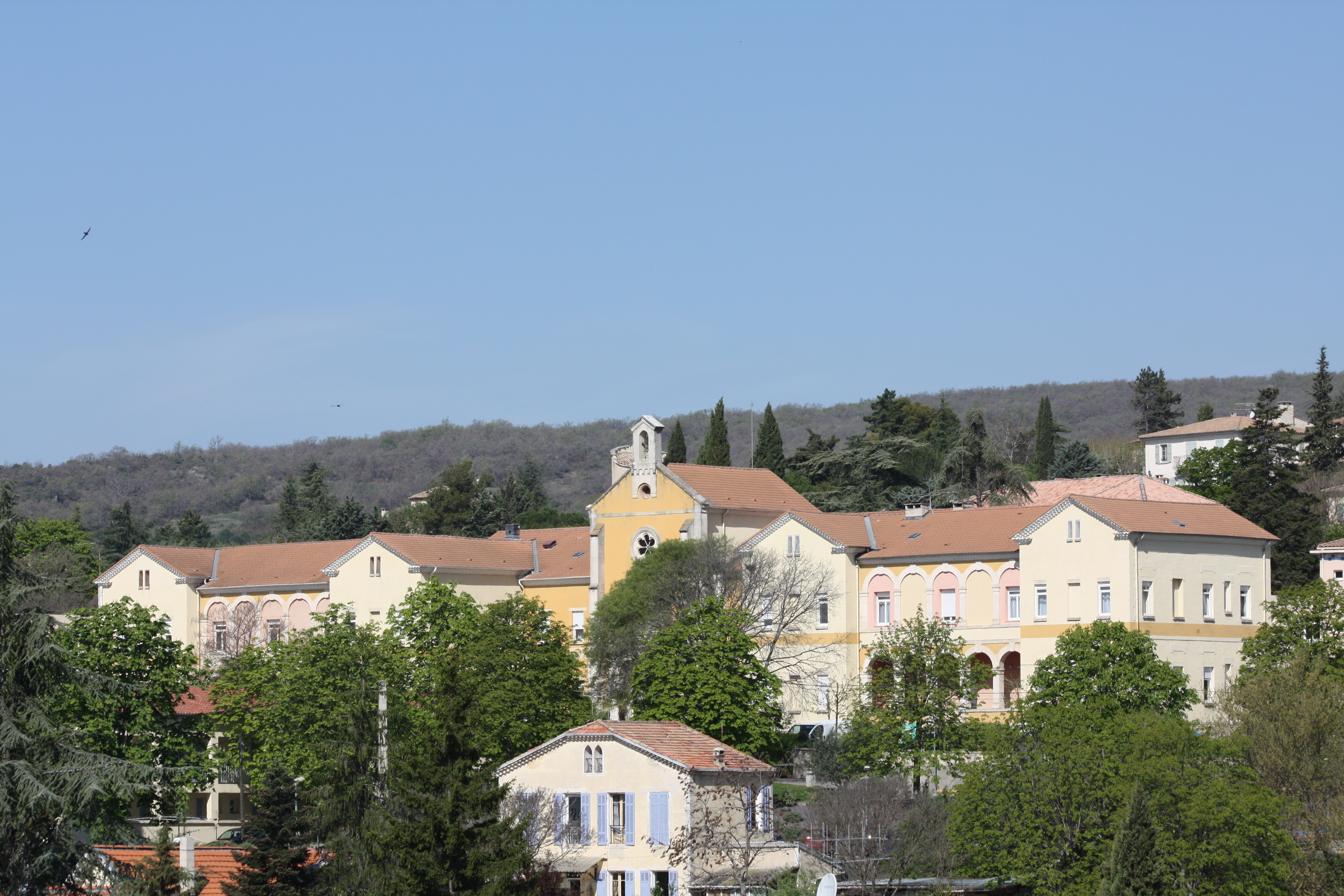
Hôpital Saint-Michel

== Economy ==
=== Sisteron lamb ===
Sisteron lamb is native of the departments of Alpes-de-Haute-Provence and Drôme. Derived from traditional farms, the parent breeds being the Merino d'Arles and the Southern Alps Mourerous, they are kept on their mothers for at least two months in pastures of at least ten hectares, and stocked at fewer than 10 sheep per hectare. These lambs are registered under the Institut national de l’origine et de la qualité (INAO). The associated regulations end the practice of raising stock in the same conditions but from multiple regions, including all of Provence, the Massif Central, and the Piedmont.

== Population ==
Historical population
Year	Pop.	±% p.a.
1968	173	—
1975	180	+0.57%
1982	208	+2.09%
1990	279	+3.74%
1999	319	+1.50%
2007	393	+2.64%
2012	399	+0.30%
2017	428	+1.41%
2023	419	−0.35%
Source: INSEE

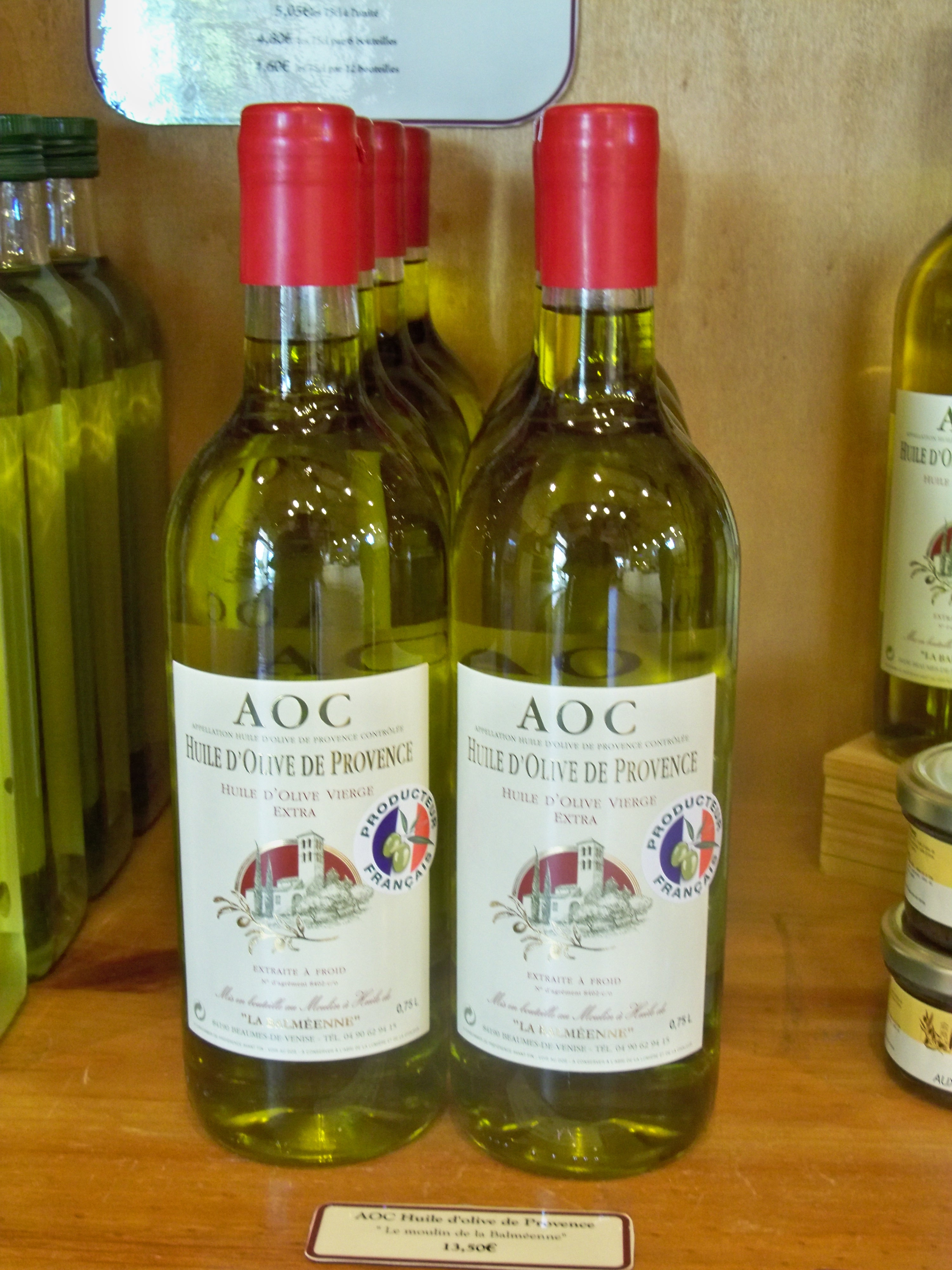
Olive oil produced in the area

== History ==
Some discoveries attest to an active state of this town dating to prehistoric and Roman eras.

=== Antiquity ===
In ancient times the territory of Sigonce was part of the Sogiontiques, whose territory extends south of the Baronnies à la Durance. The Sogiontiques are federated to Voconces and after the Roman conquest, they were attached with them in the Roman province of Narbonne. In the second century, they were detached from Voconces and formed a separate civitas, with its capital 'Segustero' (Sisteron).

=== Middle Ages ===
While the southeast of Gaul was a land Burgundian under King of the Ostrogoths, Theodoric the Great conquered the region between Durance, Rhone and Isere in 510. The town briefly depended once more on Italy until 526. To reconcile with the Burgundian king, Gondemar III, the regent Ostrogothic Amalasuntha gave him the territory. The town of Sigonce was, for the first time, in charters in 1206. It was then a hunting reserve list of the counts of Forcalquier, which was given to the Ganagobie Priory. The feud is therefore within the Abbey of Cluny through Ganagobie. The Aris community (Arises) reported began as early as 960, when its territory was given to the Abbey of Ganagobie, which counted 21 villages in 1315, but was heavily depopulated by the crises of the fourteenth century (Black Death and the Hundred Years' War) and annexed by that of Sigonce in the fifteenth century. The community was under the magistrature of Forcalquier.

=== French Revolution ===
During the French Revolution, the town developed a political scene, created after the end of 1792.

=== Since the Revolution ===
The coup of December 2, 1851 by Napoleon III committed against the Second Republic of France provoked an armed uprising in the Basses-Alpes, in defense of the French Constitution of 1848. After the failure of the uprising, severe repression continued for those who stood up to defend the Republic: new inhabitants of Sigonce were brought before the Joint Committee, the most common punishment of deportation to Algeria. Like many municipalities in the department, Sigonce had a school well before the Jules Ferry laws: in 1863, they already had a primary education that provides boys, the chief town. The same instruction was given to girls, although the Falloux law (1851), which required the opening of a girls' school in municipalities had more than 800 unsupported inhabitants., (p) The town benefits from the subsidies of the second Duruy Act (1877) to build a new school.

== See also ==
- Communes of the Alpes-de-Haute-Provence department
