= Fontienne =

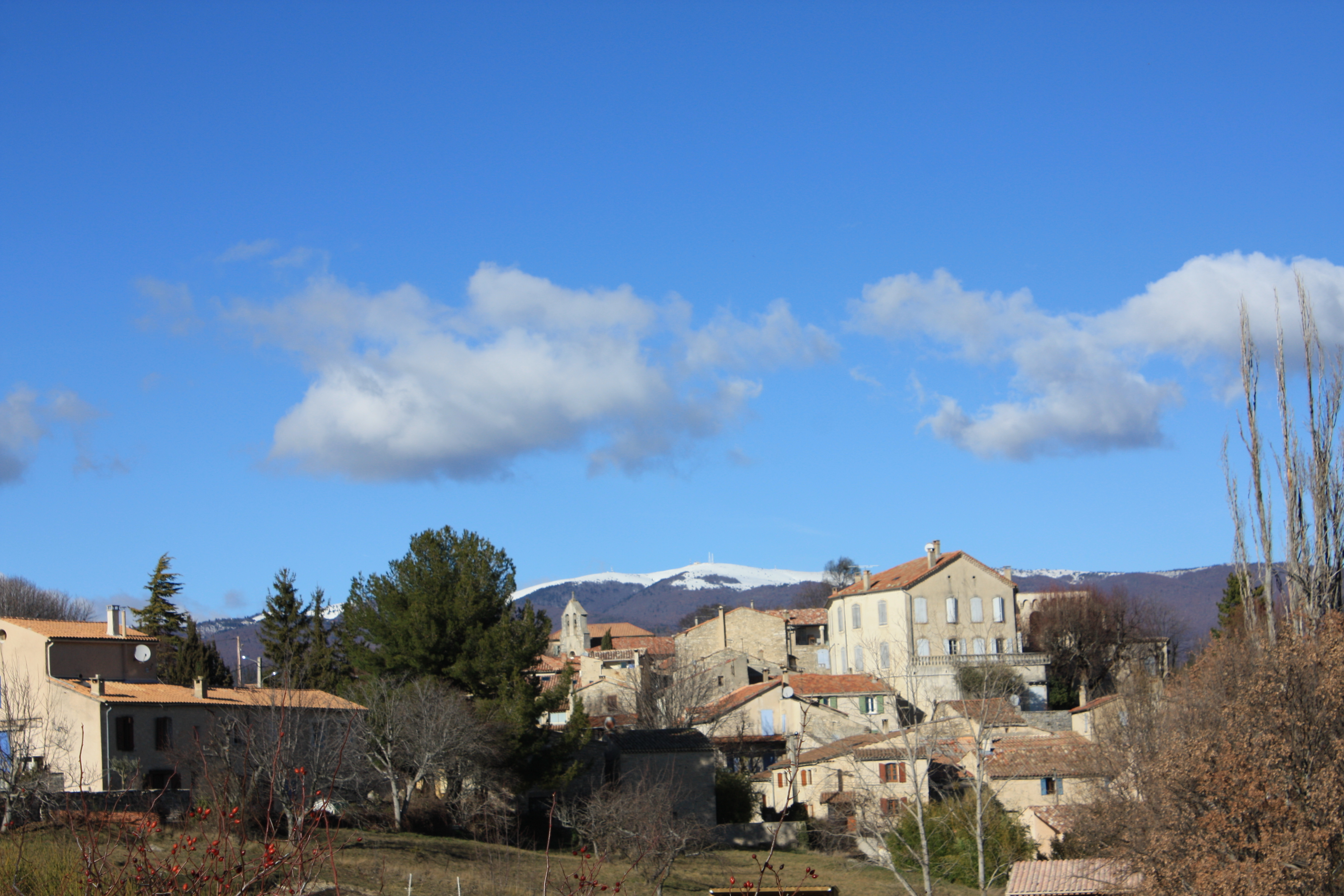
- A general view of the village of Fontienne, with the Montagne de Lure in the background

- Coat of arms
- Location of Fontienne
- Location within France Location within Provence-Alpes-Côte d'Azur
- Coordinates: 44°00′34″N 5°47′38″E
- Country: France
- Region: Provence-Alpes-Côte d'Azur
- Department: Alpes-de-Haute-Provence
- Arrondissement: Forcalquier
- Canton: Forcalquier
- Intercommunality: Pays de Forcalquier et Montagne de Lure

Government
  - Mayor (2026–32): Guy Jauffred
- Area^{1}: 8.18 km^{2} (3.16 sq mi)
- Elevation: 723 m (2,372 ft)
- Highest elevation: 894 m (2,933 ft)
- Lowest elevation: 513 m (1,683 ft)
- Population (2023): 129
  - Density: 15.8/km^{2} (40.8/sq mi)
- Time zone: UTC+01:00 (CET)
  - Summer (DST): UTC+02:00 (CEST)
- INSEE/Postal code: 04087 /04230
- ^{1} French Land Register data, which excludes lakes, ponds, glaciers > 1 km^{2} (0.386 sq mi or 247 acres) and river estuaries.

Fontienne (French pronunciation: [fɔ̃tjɛn]; Occitan: Fontiena) is a commune in the Alpes-de-Haute-Provence department in southeastern France.

== Population ==
Historical population
Year	Pop.	±% p.a.
1968	25	—
1975	24	−0.58%
1982	52	+11.68%
1990	73	+4.33%
1999	116	+5.28%
2007	133	+1.72%
2012	132	−0.15%
2017	128	−0.61%
2023	129	+0.13%
Source: INSEE

== See also ==
- Communes of the Alpes-de-Haute-Provence department
