= Montlaux =

- Commune
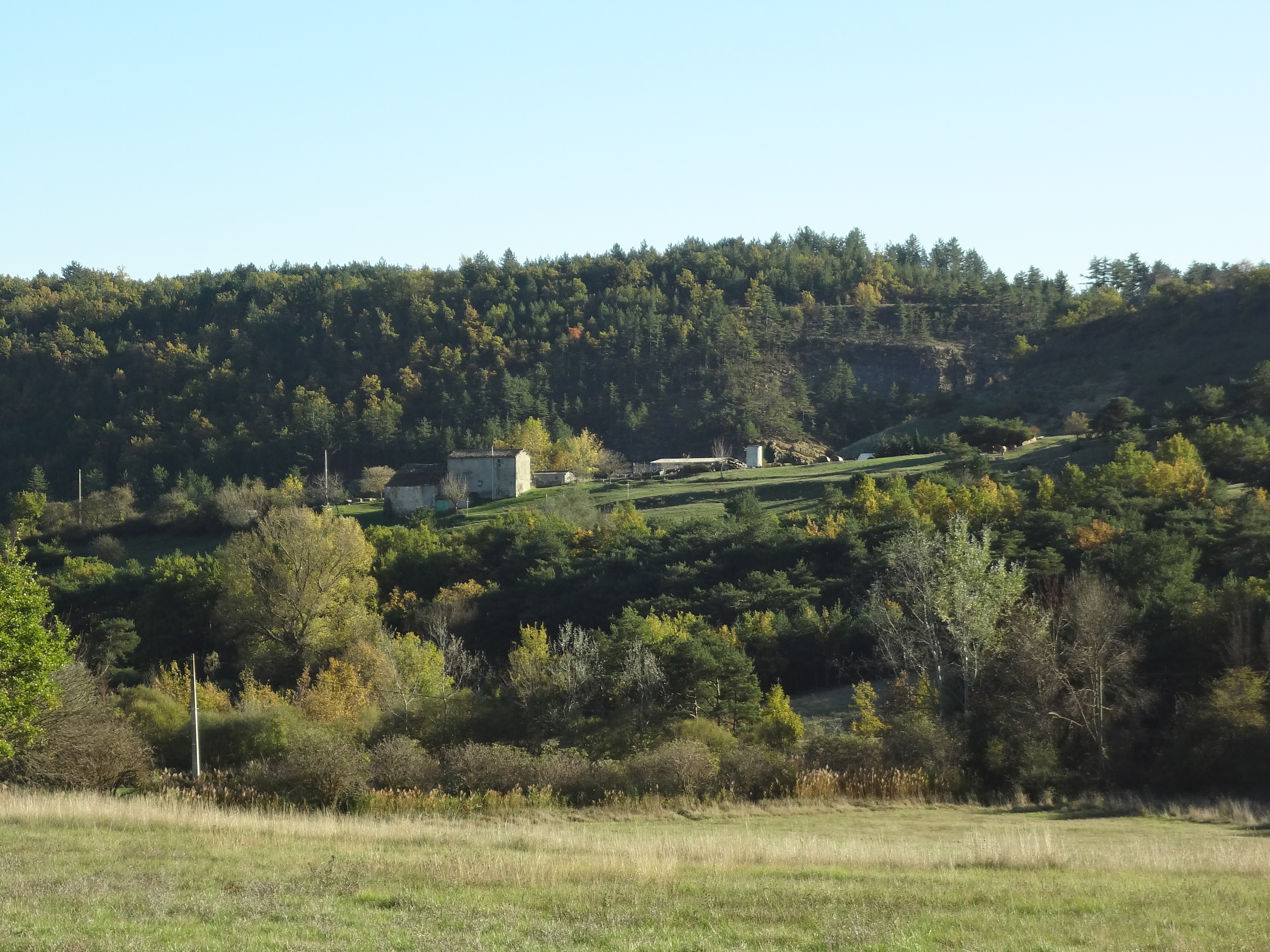
- A farmhouse on a hill, near to old Montlaux

- Coat of arms
- Location of Montlaux
- Location within France Location within Provence-Alpes-Côte d'Azur
- Coordinates: 44°02′52″N 5°50′43″E
- Country: France
- Region: Provence-Alpes-Côte d'Azur
- Department: Alpes-de-Haute-Provence
- Arrondissement: Forcalquier
- Canton: Forcalquier
- Intercommunality: Pays de Forcalquier et Montagne de Lure

Government
  - Mayor (2026–32): Camille Feller
- Area^{1}: 19.75 km^{2} (7.63 sq mi)
- Elevation: 550 m (1,800 ft)
- Highest elevation: 807 m (2,648 ft)
- Lowest elevation: 492 m (1,614 ft)
- Population (2023): 209
  - Density: 10.6/km^{2} (27.4/sq mi)
- Time zone: UTC+01:00 (CET)
  - Summer (DST): UTC+02:00 (CEST)
- INSEE/Postal code: 04130 /04230
- ^{1} French Land Register data, which excludes lakes, ponds, glaciers > 1 km^{2} (0.386 sq mi or 247 acres) and river estuaries.

Montlaux (French pronunciation: [mɔ̃lo]; Occitan: Montlaur) is a commune in the Alpes-de-Haute-Provence department in southeastern France.

It is a village situated on the edge of the Lauzon river, far from the main highways.

The village is unusual because it is very spread-out, contrary to most settlements in the area where the houses are clustered together with vast empty spaces on the outskirts.

Only in the small hamlet of Jacons will you find houses grouped together, along with the townhall and church.

== Population ==
Historical population
Year	Pop.	±% p.a.
1968	87	—
1975	91	+0.64%
1982	118	+3.78%
1990	117	−0.11%
1999	132	+1.35%
2007	133	+0.09%
2012	115	−2.87%
2017	195	+11.14%
2023	209	+1.16%
Source: INSEE

== See also ==
- Communes of the Alpes-de-Haute-Provence department
