= Pierrerue, Alpes-de-Haute-Provence =

Pierrerue
- Commune
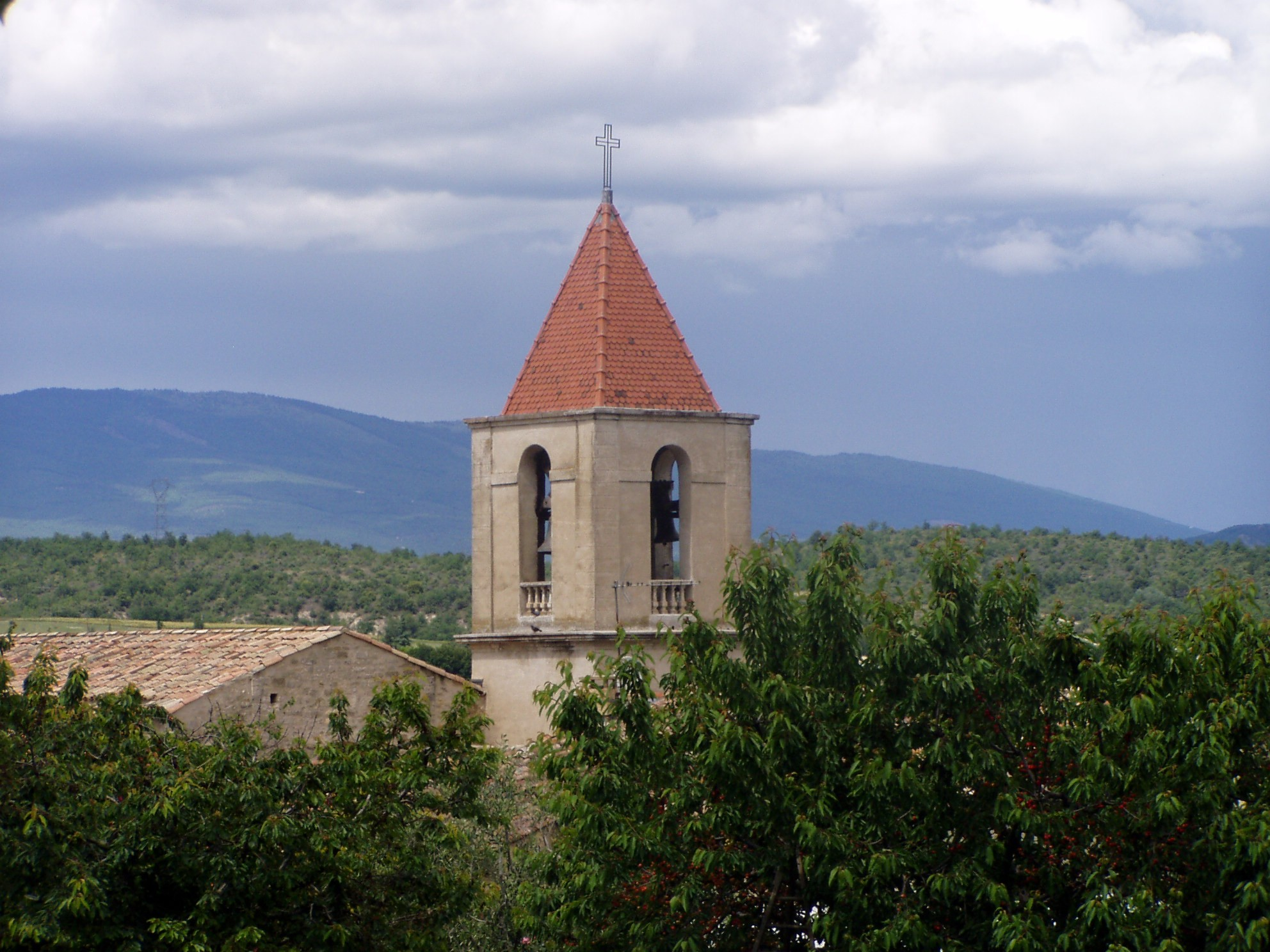
- The bell tower of the Church of Pierrerue

- Coat of arms
- Location of Pierrerue
- Location within France Location within Provence-Alpes-Côte d'Azur
- Coordinates: 43°57′25″N 5°50′01″E
- Country: France
- Region: Provence-Alpes-Côte d'Azur
- Department: Alpes-de-Haute-Provence
- Arrondissement: Forcalquier
- Canton: Forcalquier
- Intercommunality: Pays de Forcalquier et Montagne de Lure

Government
  - Mayor (2026–32): Éric Jean
- Area^{1}: 10.86 km^{2} (4.19 sq mi)
- Highest elevation: 621 m (2,037 ft)
- Lowest elevation: 379 m (1,243 ft)
- Population (2023): 529
  - Density: 48.7/km^{2} (126/sq mi)
- Time zone: UTC+01:00 (CET)
  - Summer (DST): UTC+02:00 (CEST)
- INSEE/Postal code: 04151 /04300
- ^{1} French Land Register data, which excludes lakes, ponds, glaciers > 1 km^{2} (0.386 sq mi or 247 acres) and river estuaries.

Pierrerue (French pronunciation: [pjɛʁ.ʁy]; Occitan: Peirarua) is a commune in the Alpes-de-Haute-Provence department in southeastern France.

== Population ==
Historical population
Year	Pop.	±% p.a.
1968	245	—
1975	222	−1.40%
1982	275	+3.11%
1990	342	+2.76%
1999	404	+1.87%
2007	521	+3.23%
2012	521	+0.00%
2017	493	−1.10%
2023	529	+1.18%
Source: INSEE

== See also ==
- Communes of the Alpes-de-Haute-Provence department
