= Mallefougasse-Augès =

- Commune
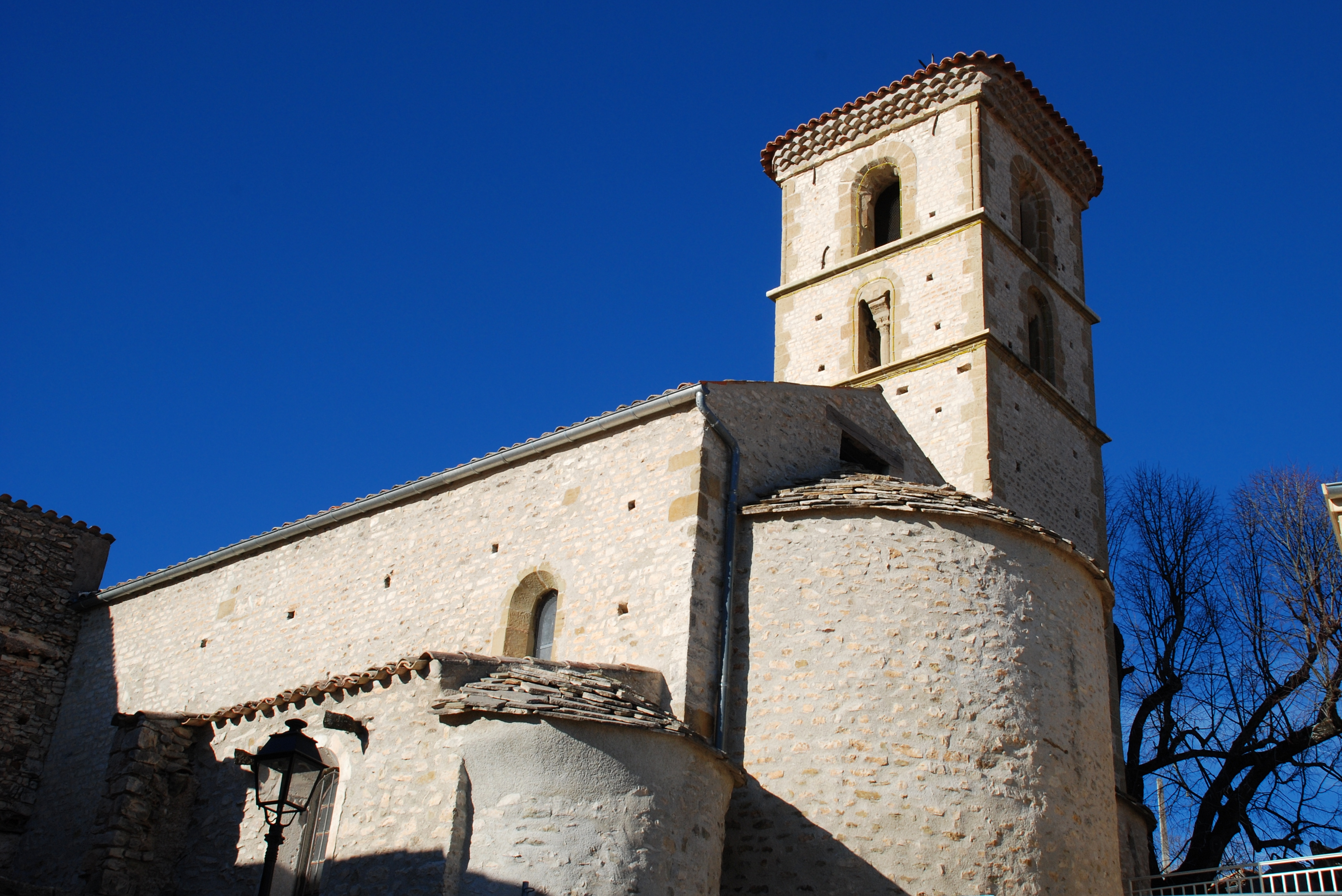
- The church of Saint-Jean-Baptiste, in Mallefougasse

- Coat of arms
- Location of Mallefougasse-Augès
- Location within France Location within Provence-Alpes-Côte d'Azur
- Coordinates: 44°04′02″N 5°53′55″E
- Country: France
- Region: Provence-Alpes-Côte d'Azur
- Department: Alpes-de-Haute-Provence
- Arrondissement: Digne-les-Bains
- Canton: Forcalquier
- Intercommunality: CA Provence-Alpes

Government
  - Mayor (2026–32): Dominique Piganeau
- Area^{1}: 19.71 km^{2} (7.61 sq mi)
- Elevation: 700 m (2,300 ft)
- Highest elevation: 1,545 m (5,069 ft)
- Lowest elevation: 460 m (1,510 ft)
- Population (2023): 327
  - Density: 16.6/km^{2} (43.0/sq mi)
- Time zone: UTC+01:00 (CET)
  - Summer (DST): UTC+02:00 (CEST)
- INSEE/Postal code: 04109 /04230
- ^{1} French Land Register data, which excludes lakes, ponds, glaciers > 1 km^{2} (0.386 sq mi or 247 acres) and river estuaries.

Mallefougasse-Augès (French pronunciation: [malfuɡas oʒɛs]; Occitan: Malafogassa d'Augès) is a commune in the Alpes-de-Haute-Provence department in southeastern France.

== Population ==
Historical population
Year	Pop.	±% p.a.
1968	23	—
1975	38	+7.44%
1982	78	+10.82%
1990	98	+2.89%
1999	136	+3.71%
2007	210	+5.58%
2012	286	+6.37%
2017	327	+2.72%
2023	327	+0.00%
Source: INSEE

== See also ==
- Communes of the Alpes-de-Haute-Provence department
