= Canton of Forcalquier =

Coordinates: 43°57′36″N 5°46′50″E

Forcalquier
- Canton
- Interactive map of Forcalquier
- Country: France
- Region: Provence-Alpes-Côte d'Azur
- Department: Alpes-de-Haute-Provence
- No. of communes: {{{nbcomm}}}
- Area: 336.36 km^{2} (129.87 sq mi)
- Population (2023): 11,521
  - Density: 34.252/km^{2} (88.712/sq mi)
- INSEE code: 04 06

The canton of Forcalquier is an administrative division in southeastern France. At the French canton reorganisation which came into effect in March 2015, the canton was expanded from 10 to 15 communes:

1. La Brillanne
2. Cruis
3. Fontienne
4. Forcalquier
5. Lardiers
6. Limans
7. Lurs
8. Mallefougasse-Augès
9. Montlaux
10. Niozelles
11. Ongles
12. Pierrerue
13. Revest-Saint-Martin
14. Saint-Étienne-les-Orgues
15. Sigonce

== Demographics ==
Historical population
Year	Pop.	±% p.a.
2013	10,820	—
2018	11,381	+1.02%
Source: INSEE

== See also ==
- Cantons of the Alpes-de-Haute-Provence department
