= Ongles =

- Commune
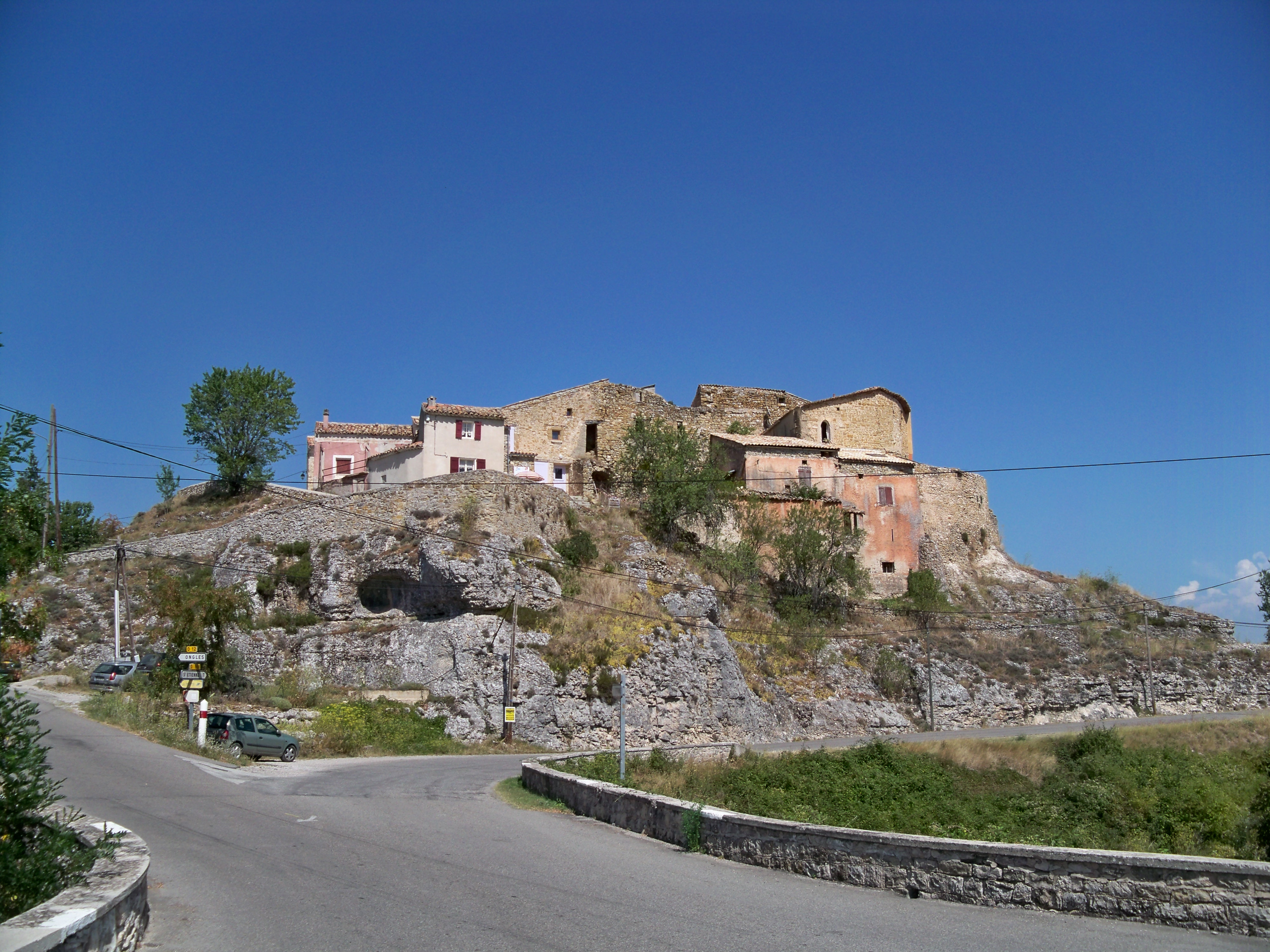
- Rocher d'Ongle hamlet

- Coat of arms
- Location of Ongles
- Location within France Location within Provence-Alpes-Côte d'Azur
- Coordinates: 44°01′44″N 5°44′03″E
- Country: France
- Region: Provence-Alpes-Côte d'Azur
- Department: Alpes-de-Haute-Provence
- Arrondissement: Forcalquier
- Canton: Forcalquier
- Intercommunality: Pays de Forcalquier-Montagne de Lure

Government
  - Mayor (2026–32): Maryse Blanc-Ventre
- Area^{1}: 31.46 km^{2} (12.15 sq mi)
- Highest elevation: 1,320 m (4,330 ft)
- Lowest elevation: 517 m (1,696 ft)
- Population (2023): 358
  - Density: 11.4/km^{2} (29.5/sq mi)
- Time zone: UTC+01:00 (CET)
  - Summer (DST): UTC+02:00 (CEST)
- INSEE/Postal code: 04141 /04230
- ^{1} French Land Register data, which excludes lakes, ponds, glaciers > 1 km^{2} (0.386 sq mi or 247 acres) and river estuaries.

Ongles (French pronunciation: [ɔ̃ɡl]; Occitan: Onglas) is a commune in the Alpes-de-Haute-Provence department in southeastern France.

== Population ==
Historical population
Year	Pop.	±% p.a.
1968	240	—
1975	187	−3.50%
1982	197	+0.75%
1990	239	+2.45%
1999	278	+1.69%
2007	324	+1.93%
2012	347	+1.38%
2017	372	+1.40%
2023	358	−0.64%
Source: INSEE

== See also ==
- Communes of the Alpes-de-Haute-Provence department
