= Cruis =

- Commune
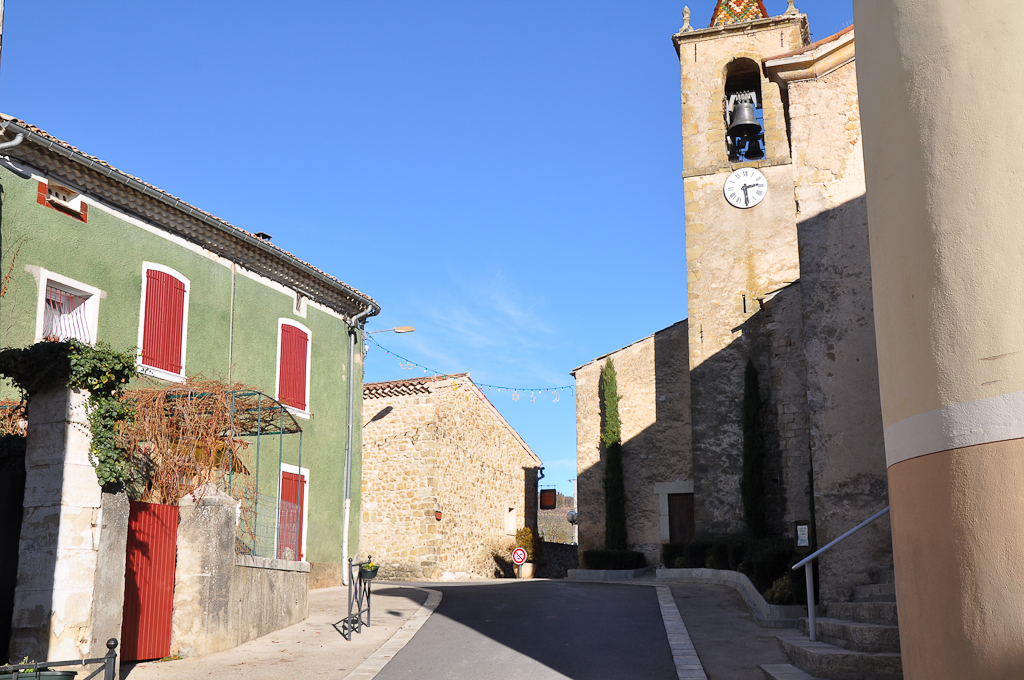
- The church in Cruis

- Coat of arms
- Location of Cruis
- Location within France Location within Provence-Alpes-Côte d'Azur
- Coordinates: 44°03′47″N 5°50′12″E
- Country: France
- Region: Provence-Alpes-Côte d'Azur
- Department: Alpes-de-Haute-Provence
- Arrondissement: Forcalquier
- Canton: Forcalquier
- Intercommunality: Pays de Forcalquier et Montagne de Lure

Government
  - Mayor (2026–32): Félix Moroso
- Area^{1}: 36.47 km^{2} (14.08 sq mi)
- Elevation: 711 m (2,333 ft)
- Highest elevation: 1,732 m (5,682 ft)
- Lowest elevation: 575 m (1,886 ft)
- Population (2023): 655
  - Density: 18.0/km^{2} (46.5/sq mi)
- Time zone: UTC+01:00 (CET)
  - Summer (DST): UTC+02:00 (CEST)
- INSEE/Postal code: 04065 /04230
- ^{1} French Land Register data, which excludes lakes, ponds, glaciers > 1 km^{2} (0.386 sq mi or 247 acres) and river estuaries.

Cruis is a commune in the Alpes-de-Haute-Provence department in southeastern France.

== Population ==
Historical population
Year	Pop.	±% p.a.
1968	248	—
1975	236	−0.71%
1982	275	+2.21%
1990	408	+5.05%
1999	551	+3.39%
2007	590	+0.86%
2012	637	+1.54%
2017	642	+0.16%
2023	655	+0.33%
Source: INSEE

== See also ==
- Communes of the Alpes-de-Haute-Provence department
