= Saint-Étienne-les-Orgues =

- Commune
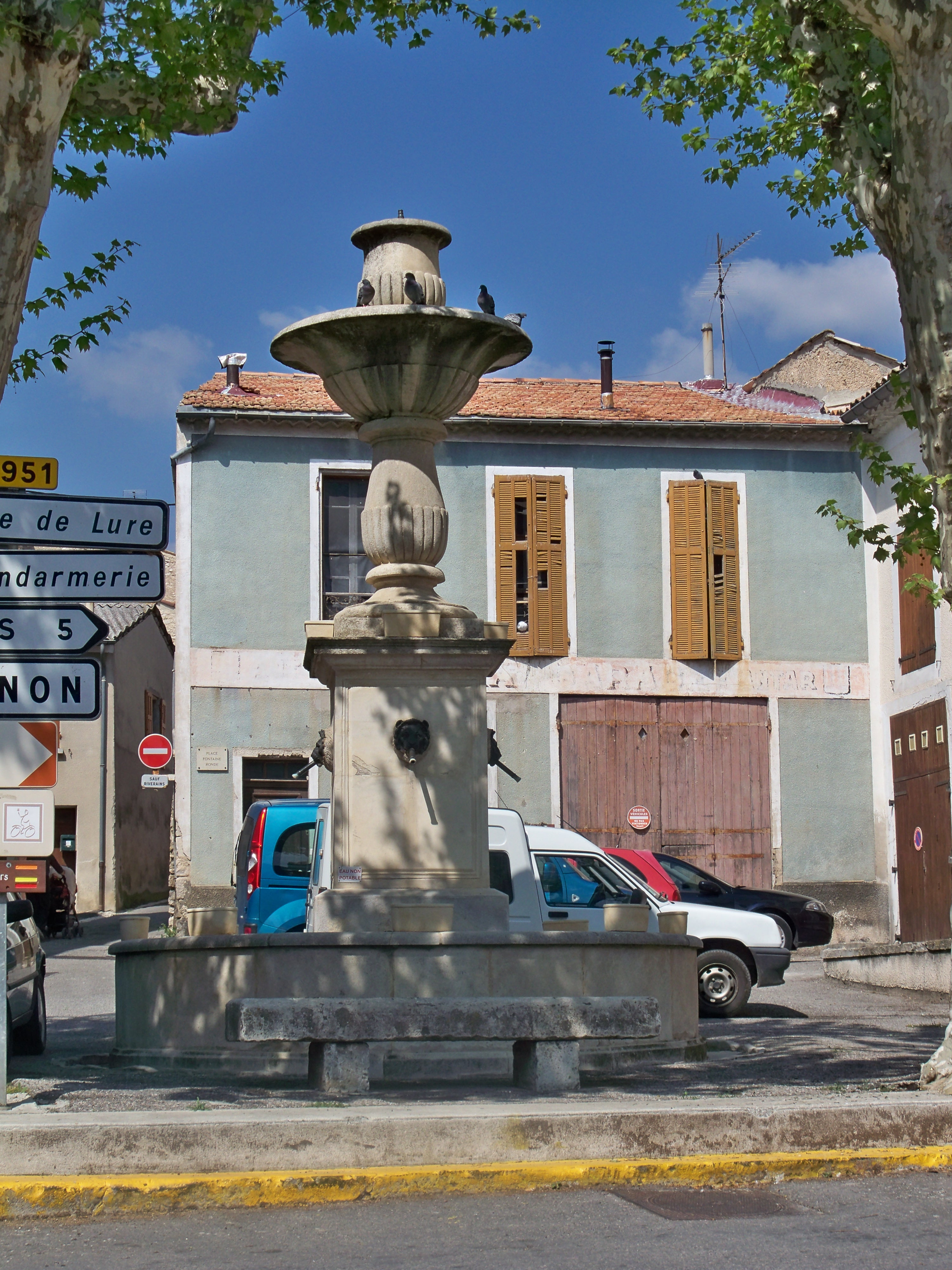
- The fountain in Saint-Étienne-les-Orgues

- Coat of arms
- Location of Saint-Étienne-les-Orgues
- Location within France Location within Provence-Alpes-Côte d'Azur
- Coordinates: 44°02′48″N 5°46′52″E
- Country: France
- Region: Provence-Alpes-Côte d'Azur
- Department: Alpes-de-Haute-Provence
- Arrondissement: Forcalquier
- Canton: Forcalquier
- Intercommunality: Pays de Forcalquier et Montagne de Lure

Government
  - Mayor (2026–32): Patricia Paul
- Area^{1}: 48.42 km^{2} (18.70 sq mi)
- Elevation: 687 m (2,254 ft)
- Highest elevation: 1,825 m (5,988 ft)
- Lowest elevation: 549 m (1,801 ft)
- Population (2023): 1,286
  - Density: 26.56/km^{2} (68.79/sq mi)
- Time zone: UTC+01:00 (CET)
  - Summer (DST): UTC+02:00 (CEST)
- INSEE/Postal code: 04178 /04230
- ^{1} French Land Register data, which excludes lakes, ponds, glaciers > 1 km^{2} (0.386 sq mi or 247 acres) and river estuaries.

Saint-Étienne-les-Orgues (French pronunciation: [sɛ̃.t‿etjɛn le.z‿ɔʁɡ]; Provençal: Sant Estève deis Òrgues) is a commune in the Alpes-de-Haute-Provence department in southeastern France.

== Population ==
Historical population
| Year | Pop. | ±% p.a. |
|---|---|---|
| 1968 | 478 | — |
| 1975 | 561 | +2.31% |
| 1982 | 679 | +2.76% |
| 1990 | 1,091 | +6.11% |
| 1999 | 873 | −2.45% |
| 2007 | 1,186 | +3.90% |
| 2012 | 1,234 | +0.80% |
| 2017 | 1,296 | +0.99% |
| 2023 | 1,286 | −0.13% |
Source: INSEE

== See also ==
- Communes of the Alpes-de-Haute-Provence department
