= Lardiers =

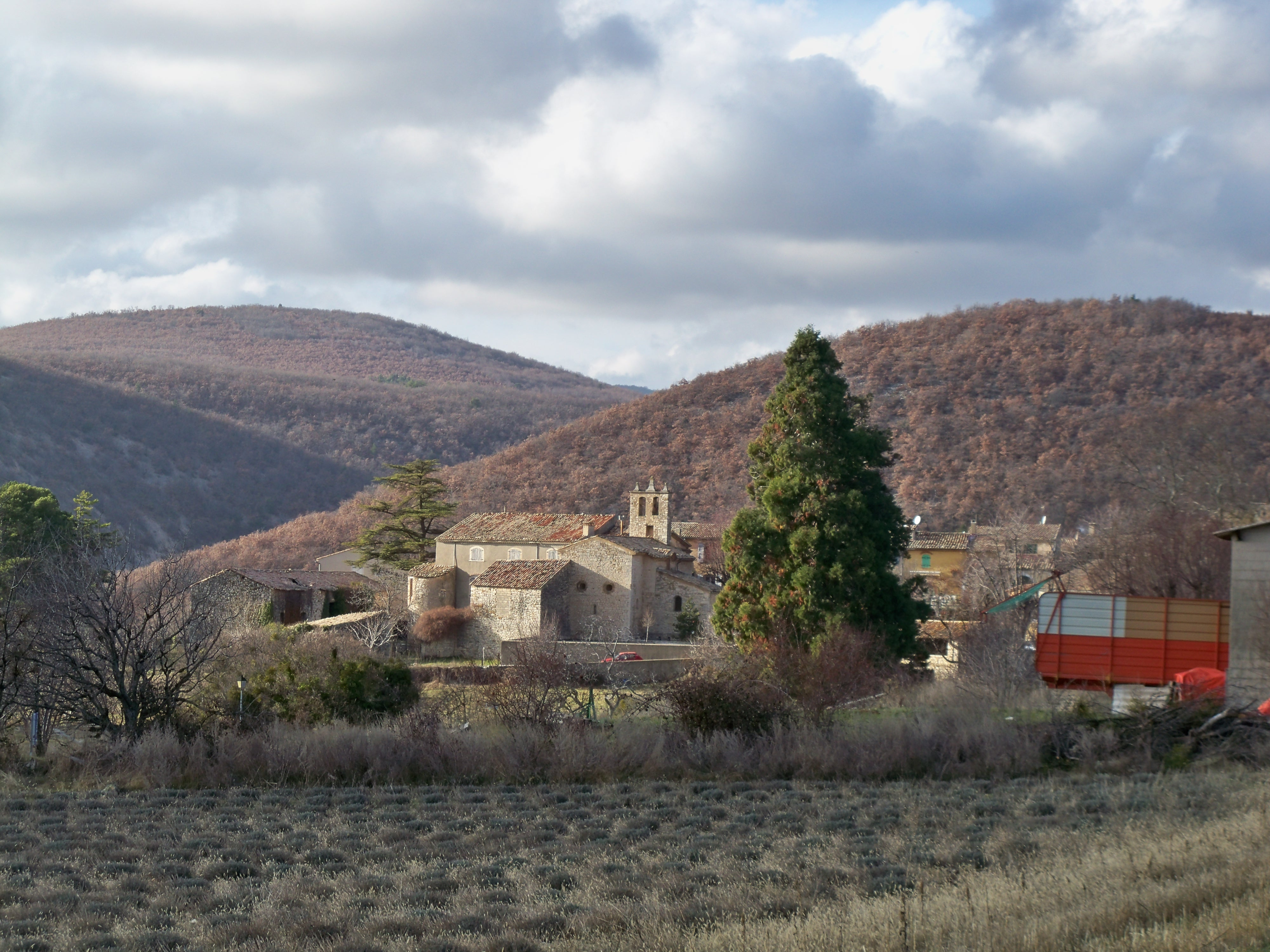
- A general view of the village of Lardiers

- Coat of arms
- Location of Lardiers
- Location within France Location within Provence-Alpes-Côte d'Azur
- Coordinates: 44°03′28″N 5°42′46″E
- Country: France
- Region: Provence-Alpes-Côte d'Azur
- Department: Alpes-de-Haute-Provence
- Arrondissement: Forcalquier
- Canton: Forcalquier
- Intercommunality: Pays de Forcalquier et Montagne de Lure

Government
  - Mayor (2026–32): Robert Usseglio
- Area^{1}: 30.08 km^{2} (11.61 sq mi)
- Elevation: 766 m (2,513 ft)
- Highest elevation: 1,700 m (5,600 ft)
- Lowest elevation: 679 m (2,228 ft)
- Population (2023): 143
  - Density: 4.75/km^{2} (12.3/sq mi)
- Time zone: UTC+01:00 (CET)
  - Summer (DST): UTC+02:00 (CEST)
- INSEE/Postal code: 04101 /04230
- ^{1} French Land Register data, which excludes lakes, ponds, glaciers > 1 km^{2} (0.386 sq mi or 247 acres) and river estuaries.

Lardiers is a commune in the Alpes-de-Haute-Provence department in southeastern France.

== Population ==
Historical population
Year	Pop.	±% p.a.
1968	71	—
1975	63	−1.69%
1982	77	+2.91%
1990	99	+3.19%
1999	124	+2.53%
2007	115	−0.94%
2012	115	+0.00%
2017	126	+1.84%
2023	143	+2.13%
Source: INSEE

== See also ==
- Communes of the Alpes-de-Haute-Provence department
