= Arrondissement of Digne-les-Bains =

Coordinates: 44.10°N 6.23°E

Digne-les-Bains
- Arrondissement
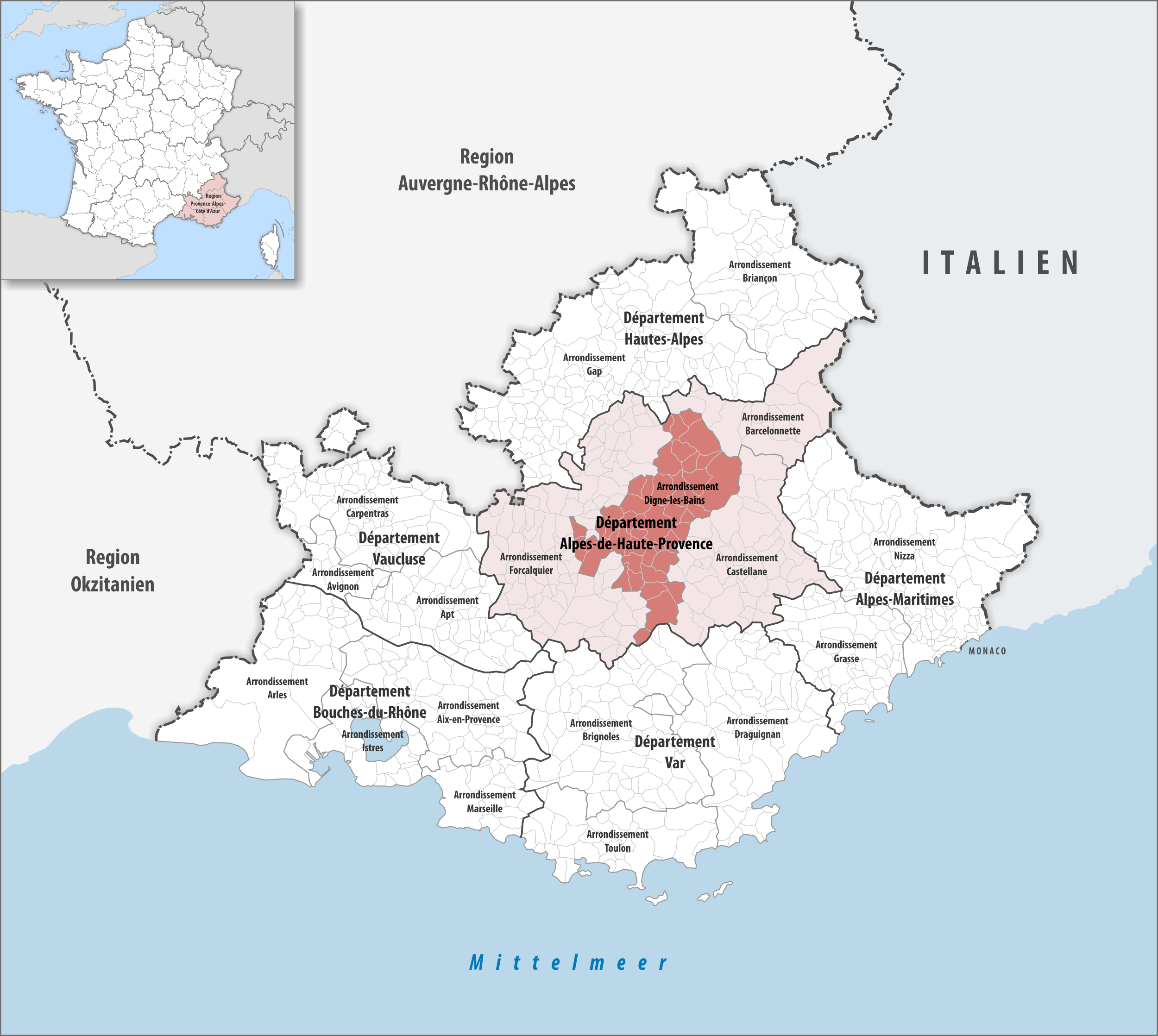
- Location within the region Provence-Alpes-Côte d'Azur
- Country: France
- Region: Provence-Alpes-Côte d'Azur
- Department: Alpes-de-Haute-Provence
- No. of communes: {{{nbcomm}}}
- Area: 1,574.0 km^{2} (607.7 sq mi)
- Population (2023): 49,137
  - Density: 31.218/km^{2} (80.854/sq mi)
- INSEE code: 043

The arrondissement of Digne-les-Bains is an arrondissement of France in the Alpes-de-Haute-Provence department in the Provence-Alpes-Côte d'Azur region. It has had 46 communes. Its population is 48,136 (2021), and its area is 1,574.0 km^{2} (607.7 sq mi).

== Composition ==
The communes of the arrondissement of Digne-les-Bains, and their INSEE codes, are:

1. Aiglun (04001)
2. Archail (04009)
3. Auzet (04017)
4. Barles (04020)
5. Barras (04021)
6. Beaujeu (04024)
7. Beynes (04028)
8. Bras-d'Asse (04031)
9. Le Brusquet (04036)
10. Le Castellard-Mélan (04040)
11. Le Chaffaut-Saint-Jurson (04046)
12. Champtercier (04047)
13. Château-Arnoux-Saint-Auban (04049)
14. Châteauredon (04054)
15. Digne-les-Bains (04070)
16. Draix (04072)
17. Entrages (04074)
18. L'Escale (04079)
19. Estoublon (04084)
20. Ganagobie (04091)
21. Hautes-Duyes (04177)
22. La Javie (04097)
23. Majastres (04107)
24. Malijai (04108)
25. Mallefougasse-Augès (04109)
26. Mallemoisson (04110)
27. Marcoux (04113)
28. Les Mées (04116)
29. Mézel (04121)
30. Mirabeau (04122)
31. Montclar (04126)
32. Moustiers-Sainte-Marie (04135)
33. Peyruis (04149)
34. Prads-Haute-Bléone (04155)
35. La Robine-sur-Galabre (04167)
36. Sainte-Croix-du-Verdon (04176)
37. Saint-Jeannet (04181)
38. Saint-Julien-d'Asse (04182)
39. Saint-Jurs (04184)
40. Saint-Martin-lès-Seyne (04191)
41. Selonnet (04203)
42. Seyne (04205)
43. Thoard (04217)
44. Verdaches (04235)
45. Le Vernet (04237)
46. Volonne (04244)

== History ==
The arrondissement of Digne-les-Bains was created in 1800. At the January 2017 reorganization of the arrondissements of Alpes-de-Haute-Provence, it lost nine communes to the arrondissement of Castellane and 16 communes to the arrondissement of Forcalquier, and it gained six communes from the arrondissement of Forcalquier.

As a result of the reorganisation of the cantons of France which came into effect in 2015, the borders of the cantons are no longer related to the borders of the arrondissements. The cantons of the arrondissement of Digne-les-Bains were, as of January 2015:

1. Barrême
2. Digne-les-Bains-Est
3. Digne-les-Bains-Ouest
4. La Javie
5. Les Mées
6. Mézel
7. Moustiers-Sainte-Marie
8. Riez
9. Seyne
10. Valensole
