= Canton of La Javie =

Coordinates: 44°10′31″N 6°21′07″E

La Javie
- Former canton
- Interactive map of La Javie
- Country: France
- Region: Provence-Alpes-Côte d'Azur
- Department: Alpes-de-Haute-Provence
- No. of communes: {{{nbcomm}}}
- Disbanded: 2015
- Area: 306.87 km^{2} (118.48 sq mi)
- Population (2012): 1,805
  - Density: 5.882/km^{2} (15.23/sq mi)

The canton of La Javie is a former administrative division in southeastern France. It was disbanded following the French canton reorganisation which came into effect in March 2015. It consisted of 6 communes, which joined the canton of Seyne in 2015. It had 1,805 inhabitants (2012).

The canton comprised the following communes:

- Archail
- Beaujeu
- Le Brusquet
- Draix
- La Javie
- Prads-Haute-Bléone

== Demographics ==
Historical population Canton of La Javie
Year	1962	1968	1975	1982	1990	1999
Pop.	779	888	934	1,186	1,482	1,691
±%	—	+14.0%	+5.2%	+27.0%	+25.0%	+14.1%
From the year 1962 on: No double counting – residents of multiple communes (e.g. students and military personnel) are counted only once. Source: INSEE

== See also ==
- Cantons of the Alpes-de-Haute-Provence department
