= Canton of Digne-les-Bains-Est =

Canton in Provence-Alpes-Côte d'Azur, France

Coordinates: 44°05′36″N 6°14′11″E

Digne-les-Bains-Est
- Former canton
- Interactive map of Digne-les-Bains-Est
- Country: France
- Region: Provence-Alpes-Côte d'Azur
- Department: Alpes-de-Haute-Provence
- No. of communes: {{{nbcomm}}}
- Disbanded: 2015
- Population (2012): 10,322

The canton of Digne-les-Bains-Est is a former administrative division in southeastern France. It was disbanded following the French canton reorganisation which came into effect in March 2015. It had 10,322 inhabitants (2012).

The canton comprised the following communes:

- Digne-les-Bains (partly)
- Entrages
- Marcoux
- La Robine-sur-Galabre

== Demographics ==
Historical population
Year	Pop.	±%
1990	9,953	—
1999	9,587	−3.7%
2012	10,322	+7.7%

== See also ==
- Cantons of the Alpes-de-Haute-Provence department
