= Canton of Digne-les-Bains-Ouest =

Coordinates: 44°05′36″N 6°14′11″E

Digne-les-Bains-Ouest
- Former canton
- Interactive map of Digne-les-Bains-Ouest
- Country: France
- Region: Provence-Alpes-Côte d'Azur
- Department: Alpes-de-Haute-Provence
- No. of communes: {{{nbcomm}}}
- Disbanded: 2015
- Population (2012): 12,820

The canton of Digne-les-Bains-Ouest is a former administrative division in southeastern France. It was disbanded following the French canton reorganisation which came into effect in March 2015. It had 12,820 inhabitants (2012).

The canton comprised the following communes:

- Aiglun
- Barras
- Le Castellard-Melan
- Le Chaffaut-Saint-Jurson
- Champtercier
- Digne-les-Bains (partly)
- Hautes-Duyes
- Mallemoisson
- Mirabeau
- Thoard

== Demographics ==
Historical population
Year	Pop.	±%
1990	10,778	—
1999	11,860	+10.0%
2012	12,820	+8.1%

== See also ==
- Cantons of the Alpes-de-Haute-Provence department
