= Archail =

- Commune
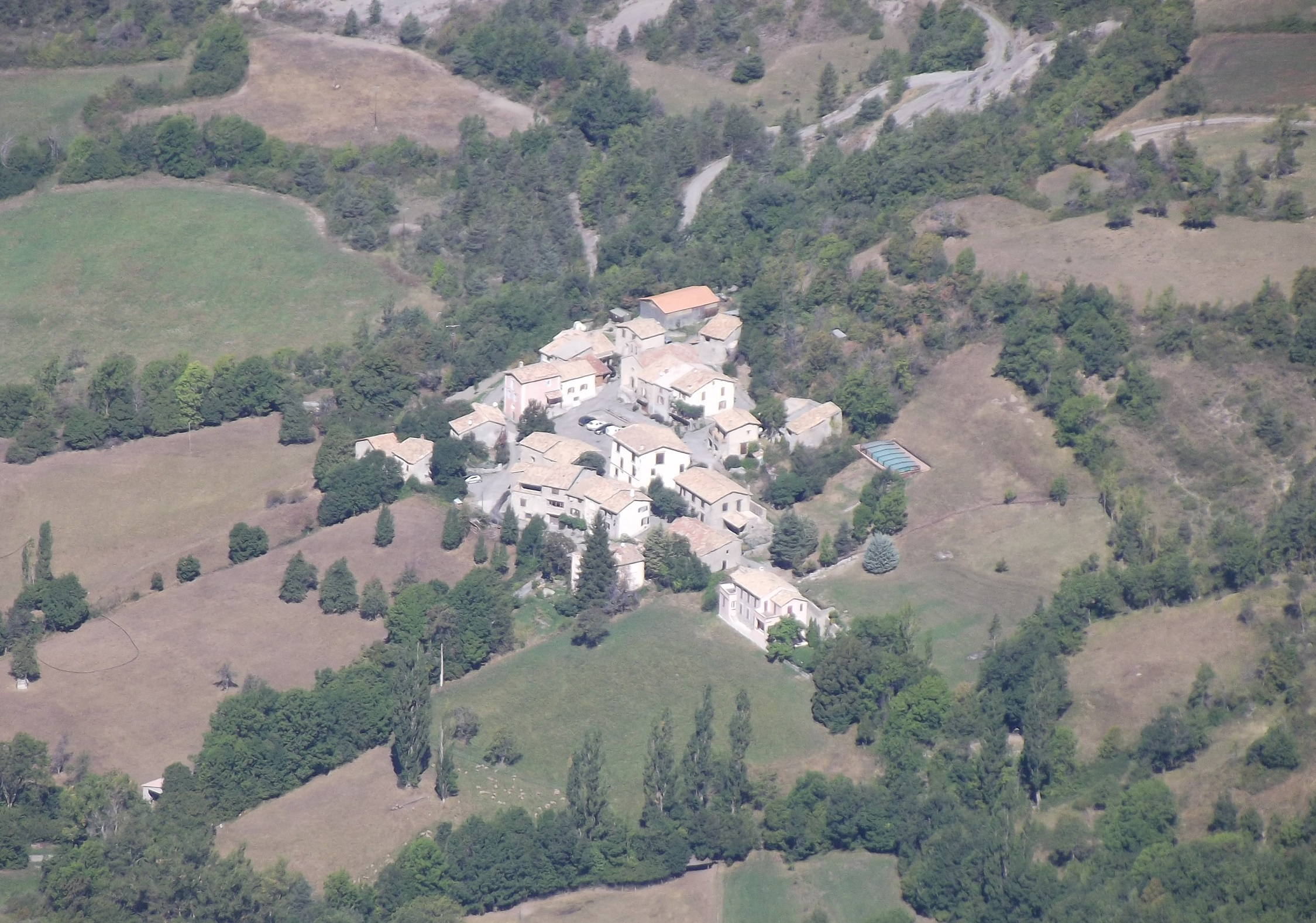
- The village
- Location of Archail
- Location within France Location within Provence-Alpes-Côte d'Azur
- Coordinates: 44°07′20″N 6°20′06″E
- Country: France
- Region: Provence-Alpes-Côte d'Azur
- Department: Alpes-de-Haute-Provence
- Arrondissement: Digne-les-Bains
- Canton: Seyne
- Intercommunality: Provence-Alpes Agglomération

Government
  - Mayor (2026–32): Olivier Ferrary
- Area^{1}: 12.99 km^{2} (5.02 sq mi)
- Elevation: 920 m (3,020 ft)
- Highest elevation: 1,984 m (6,509 ft)
- Lowest elevation: 759 m (2,490 ft)
- Population (2023): 14
  - Density: 1.1/km^{2} (2.8/sq mi)
- Time zone: UTC+01:00 (CET)
  - Summer (DST): UTC+02:00 (CEST)
- INSEE/Postal code: 04009 /04420
- ^{1} French Land Register data, which excludes lakes, ponds, glaciers > 1 km^{2} (0.386 sq mi or 247 acres) and river estuaries.

Archail (French pronunciation: [aʁʃaj]; Occitan: Archalh) is a commune in the Alpes-de-Haute-Provence department in the Provence-Alpes-Côte d'Azur region of south-eastern France.

With 14 inhabitants (as of 2023), it is the third least populated commune in the department, after Majastres and Saint-Martin-lès-Seyne. The inhabitants of the commune are known as Archailois or Archailoises in French.

== Geography ==
Archail is located some 8 km north-east of Digne and some 5 km south of Le Brusquet. By road from Digne it is 14 km by a winding mountain road. The village is located in a wooded basin at an altitude of 920m. Access to the commune is by the D22 road which runs east from Marcoux to Draix and which passes through the northern tip of the commune. A local road runs off the D22 in the northern tip of the commune and continues south through the commune to the village. The commune is mountainous and heavily forested but there is a small area of farmland south-west of the village.

=== Geology ===
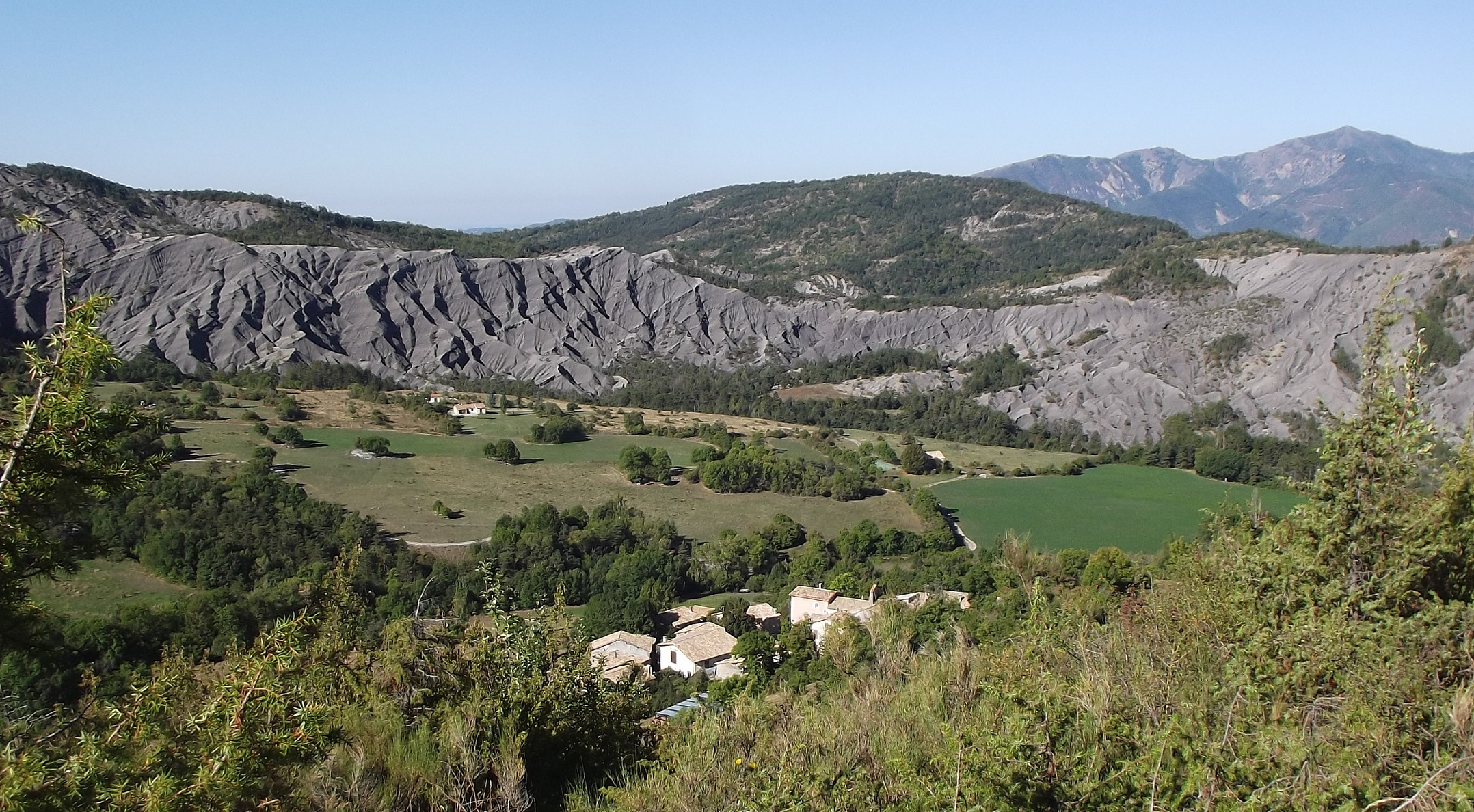
Archail village with black marl slopes to the west

Much of the commune consists of rounded hills of eroded black marl. The Pic de Couar (1,988m) is spectacular as is the Pas d'Archail (1,667m). The Ravine and Torrent of l'Areste is in the south in the hills.

=== Hydrology ===
A vast number of streams rise in the commune including: The Bouinenc (14 kilometres long), the Sauzeries Ravine (9 km long), the Mouiroués Ravine (8 km long), and its tributary, the Escure Stream (5.7 km long). These all flow north to join the Bouinenc which continues west to join the Bléone.

=== Natural and technological hazards ===
None of the 200 communes of the department is in a no seismic risk zone. The area to which Archail belongs is in Zone 1b (low risk) according to the deterministic classification of 1991 and based on its seismic history. The Canton is in Zone 4 (medium risk) according to the probabilistic classification EC8 2011. The commune of Archail is also exposed to two other natural hazards: forest fire and landslide.

== Toponymy ==
The area appears for the first time in texts around 1200 in the form Archallo. The origin of the name is Celtic-Ligurian and means in front of the rocks. The Historical Atlas of Provence also indicates a spelling of Arcalhum.

== History ==
In Antiquity the Bodiontiques (Bodiontici) inhabited the Bléone valley and so were the Gallic people who lived in what is now the commune of Archail. The Bodiontiques were defeated by Augustus at the same time as the other people present on the Tropaeum Alpium (before 14 BC) and were attached to the province of Alpes-Maritimes during its creation.

According to Daniel Thiery, the community was reported in the Polyptych of Wadalde (Bishop of Marseille) in 814 under the name Argario.

The community of Archail was under the Viguerie of Digne. In 1193 the lordship of Archail (Argal) was given by the two lords of Saint-Julien to the Chapter of Digne. The lordship was divided between the Bishops of Digne and the Chapter of Digne before the French Revolution. These new lords strengthened their new possession and collected the population in a central location.

As with many of the communes in the department, Archail had a school well before the Jules Ferry laws: in 1863 it already had a school that provided primary education for boys in the main town. No instruction was given to girls: neither the Falloux Laws (1851), which required the opening of a girls' school in communes with more than 800 inhabitants, nor the first Duruy Law (1867), which lowered the threshold to 500 inhabitants, related to Archail and it was only through the Ferry laws that Archail girls were able to regularly study.

Between 1973 and 1979 the commune was merged with Draix under the name Archail-Draix.

== Population ==
Historical population
| Year | Pop. | ±% p.a. |
|---|---|---|
| 1968 | 18 | — |
| 1975 | 11 | −6.79% |
| 1982 | 10 | −1.35% |
| 1990 | 6 | −6.19% |
| 1999 | 7 | +1.73% |
| 2007 | 7 | +0.00% |
| 2012 | 23 | +26.86% |
| 2017 | 15 | −8.19% |
| 2023 | 14 | −1.14% |
Source: INSEE

== Economy ==
In 2017, the active population was 6 people with no unemployed. All of these workers were employees and worked outside the commune.

At the end of 2015 the commune had eight active establishments: three in the industry and construction sector, four in the trade and services sector, and one in the public sector. In total there were 4 salaried jobs in the commune: three in the public sector and one in industry.

According to the Departmental Observatory of Tourism, tourism is very important for the community, with more than five tourists welcomed per resident. Most of the accommodation capacity is non-market and is composed solely of secondary homes: 17 secondary homes are 64% of the commune housing.

== Sites and monuments ==
- The Parish Church of Our Lady of the Assumption and Saint George was built in 1828. Its origin can be traced back to the 13th century. The church contains many items that are registered as historical objects:
  - A Processional Banner (19th century)
  - A Painting: Saint Charles Borromée (1842)
  - A Statue: Saint Charles Borromée (19th century)
  - A Painting: Donation of the Rosary (19th century)
  - A Thurible (18th century)
  - A Monstrance (19th century)
  - A Statue: Saint Joseph (19th century)
  - A Statue: The Coronation of the Virgin (19th century)
- The Notre Dame Chapel, situated on a hill in the middle of the cemetery, is the oldest parish church in the community: its foundation is older than the current village church. Residents participated in the rebuilding of the chapel in 1994. Until the Revolution and the Empire, this chapel was the focus of a pilgrimage in August, which attracted people in surrounding communities, and which ended with games and a ball.

== Cultural life ==
The association Les Ateliers du Couar hosts May Art every year in May with many artists-exhibitors (ceramics, paintings, sculptors, photographers) and various other events related to images in all their forms and in association with many artistic expressions (literature, poetry, cinema, theatre, etc.). The theme is rural and historical heritage and messages are conveyed through various modes such as the creation of an artist's book on transhumance.

This association publishes Les Cahiers du Couar with four numbers:

- "Banaste of words and images for a summer pasture. Transhumance 2005 at the foot of White Horse"
- the Robines
- In September 2008: the Couar Workbook No. 3 on "Water"
- In October 2009: the Couar Workbook No. 4 on honey and lavender

== Notable people linked to the commune ==
- Jean-Pierre Alexandre Dieudé (1743-1819), born in Archail, general of the armies of the Republic and the Empire.

== See also ==
- Communes of the Alpes-de-Haute-Provence department

== Bibliography ==
- Raymond Collier: La Haute-Provence monumental and artistic, Digne, Jean Louis Printing, 1986, 559 p. (in French)
- Ed. Edward Baratier, Georges Duby, and Ernest Hildesheimer: Historical Atlas. Provence, County of Venaissin, Principality of Orange, County of Nice, Principality of Monaco, Librairie Armand Colin, Paris, 1969 (in French)
