= Beaujeu, Alpes-de-Haute-Provence =

Beaujeu
- Commune
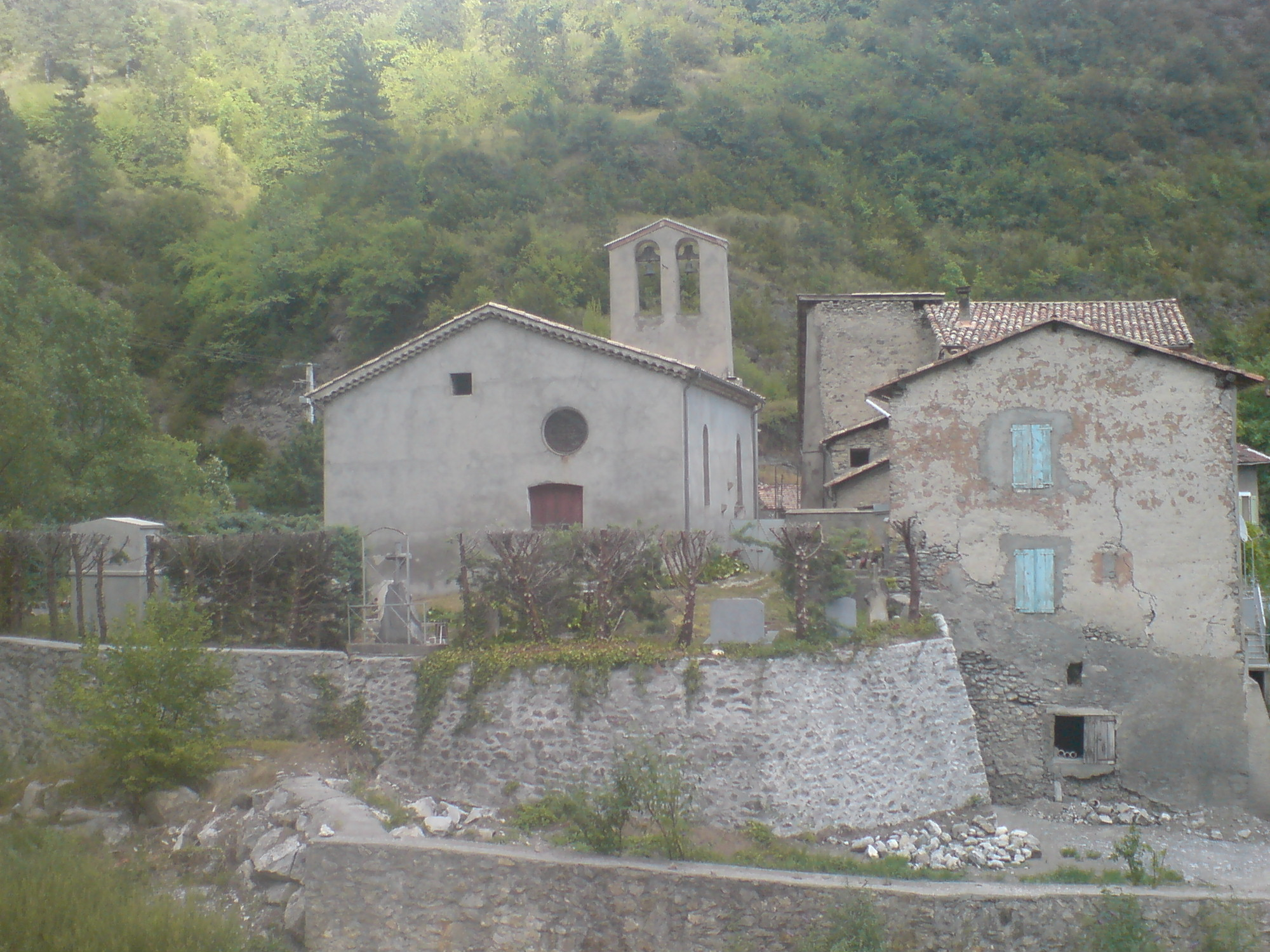
- The church in Beaujeu

- Coat of arms
- Location of Beaujeu
- Location within France Location within Provence-Alpes-Côte d'Azur
- Coordinates: 44°12′15″N 6°22′20″E
- Country: France
- Region: Provence-Alpes-Côte d'Azur
- Department: Alpes-de-Haute-Provence
- Arrondissement: Digne-les-Bains
- Canton: Seyne
- Intercommunality: CA Provence-Alpes

Government
  - Mayor (2026–32): Patrick Bernardini
- Area^{1}: 45.68 km^{2} (17.64 sq mi)
- Elevation: 880 m (2,890 ft)
- Highest elevation: 2,153 m (7,064 ft)
- Lowest elevation: 821 m (2,694 ft)
- Population (2023): 123
  - Density: 2.69/km^{2} (6.97/sq mi)
- Time zone: UTC+01:00 (CET)
  - Summer (DST): UTC+02:00 (CEST)
- INSEE/Postal code: 04024 /04420
- ^{1} French Land Register data, which excludes lakes, ponds, glaciers > 1 km^{2} (0.386 sq mi or 247 acres) and river estuaries.

Beaujeu (French pronunciation: [boʒø]; Occitan: Bèujuec) is a commune in the Alpes-de-Haute-Provence department in the Provence-Alpes-Côte d'Azur region of south-eastern France.

The inhabitants of the commune are known as Beaujolais or Beaujolaises.

== Geography ==
Beaujeu is located some 30 km east of Sisteron and 20 km north-east of Digne-les-Bains at an altitude of 880 m. Access to the commune is by the D900 road from Le Vernet in the north which passes through the length of the commune and continues south to Digne. The commune is rugged and mountainous.

An enormous number of streams rise all over the commune which mostly converge on the Arigéol which flows south to join the Bléone at La Javie.

=== Geology ===
The mountains around Beaujeu are composed of black shale.

=== Relief ===
- Blayeul Summit (2189 m) with a radio relay mast
- Chappe summit (1667 m)
- Col du Labouret (1240 m) on the D900 road

=== Environment ===
The commune has 2793 hectares of woods and forests - 61% of its area.

=== Hamlets ===
- Boullard
- le Clucheret
- l'Escale
- Fonfrède
- le Labouret
- Saint-Pierre
- les Traverses-Hautes
- le Villard

=== Natural and technological risks ===
None of the 200 communes in the department is in a no seismic risk zone. Beaujeu is in zone 1b (low risk) according to the deterministic classification of 1991 and based on its seismic history and in zone 4 (medium risk) according to the probabilistic classification EC8 of 2011. Beaujeu also faces four other natural hazards:

- Avalanche
- Forest fire
- Flood (in the Arigéol valley)
- Landslide

Beaujeu is also exposed to a risk of technological origin, namely the carriage of dangerous goods on the highway.

There is no plan for the prevention of foreseeable natural risks (PPR) for the commune and there is no DICRIM.

The town was subject to several natural disasters, including flooding, mudslides, and landslides in 1986, 1994, and 1996. The landslide on 18 May 1996 carried away two 20,000 volt power pylons.

== Toponymy ==
The term for the locality in 1147 comes from the Latin bellom jugum, meaning "beautiful mountain". It then became Bèl jog, a confusion with the Occitan bèl joc which means beau jeu in French.

The name of the hamlet Clucheret seems to come from its status as a parish which would have earned it the name of Clocher (Bell tower).

The name of the Chappe summit (1667 m) which borders Prads-Haute-Bléone is in memory of the existence of a semaphore visual telegraph relay station called telegraph Chappe after Claude Chappe who designed it in 1794.

Beaujeu appears as Beaujou on the 1750 Cassini Map and as Beaujun on the 1790 version.

== History ==
In Ancient times the Bodiontici populated the Bléone valley as well as the Gauls who lived in the current commune of Beaujeu. The Bodiontici were defeated by Augustus at the same time as the other people present on the Tropaeum Alpium before 14 BC. The commune was attached to the province of Alpes-Maritimes at the time of its creation.

According to an inventory of the property of the Abbey of St. Victor, Marseille, the abbey are owned several tenures and bergeries among which la Bouisse, Champ Premier, la Sébière, and Auche can be identified. Later there were three distinct communities, each with its church at Beaujeu, Le Clucheret, and Saint-Pierre-des-Auches. The Church of Saint Peter was originally built higher and the priory depended on the Augustinian Abbey of Valence.

The locality appears for the first time in charters of 1147 (Beljog), and a Motte-and-bailey castle was built in the 11th century at a place called La Tour.

The barony of Beaujeu extended over the communities of Mariaud and Clucheiret. A toll was established on the Col de Labouret road at the end of the Middle Ages.

In 1309, William of Roumoules was reported as lord of Roumoules, Beaujeu, Bédéjun, Bras-d'Asse, Entrages, Majastres, Vergons, and Estoublon. The death of Queen Joanna I of Naples reopened a crisis of succession to head the county of Provence and the cities of the Union of Aix (1382-1387) supported Charles, Duke of Durazzo, against Louis I of Anjou. The lord of Beaujeu and Mariaud, Gui Saint-Marcial, supported the Duke of Anjou in spring 1382, this support being conditional on the participation of the Duke in the relief expedition for the Queen.

During the French Revolution the commune had a patriotic society, founded after the end of 1792.

The French coup d'état of 1851 committed by Louis-Napoleon Bonaparte against the French Second Republic provoked an armed uprising in the Lower Alps in defence of the Constitution. After the failure of the uprising there was a severe crackdown on those who stood up to defend the Republic which included one inhabitant of Beaujeu.

As with many communes in the department Beaujeu had a school well before the Jules Ferry laws. In 1775 it already has a school that opened in winter. In 1863 there were four: in the main village and in remote villages (Saint-Pierre, Boulard, and Fontfrède), which provided primary education for boys. No instruction was given to girls: neither the Falloux Laws (1851), which required the opening of a girls' school in communes of over 800 inhabitants nor the first Duruy Law (1867), which lowers the threshold to 500 inhabitants, concerned Beaujeu. The subsidies from the second Duruy Act (1877) were used to build a new school and remodel another. It was only with the Ferry laws that the girls of Beaujeu were regularly educated.

=== Heraldry ===
Arms of Beaujeu	Blazon: Chequy, Or and Azure.

== Administration ==
List of Successive Mayors

From	To	Name
2001	2008	Jean-Pierre Brovelli
2008	2020	Brigitte Bonnet
2020	2026	Patrick Bernardini

== Demography ==
Historical population

Year	Pop.	±% p.a.
1793	372	—
1821	418	+0.42%
1846	440	+0.21%
1872	329	−1.11%
1901	271	−0.67%
1926	165	−1.97%
1946	145	−0.64%
1962	121	−1.12%
1968	92	−4.46%

Year	Pop.	±% p.a.
1975	110	+2.59%
1982	109	−0.13%
1990	129	+2.13%
1999	152	+1.84%
2007	155	+0.24%
2012	150	−0.65%
2017	130	−2.82%
2023	123	−0.92%

Source: EHESS and INSEE

== Economy ==
In 2017 the workforce was 71 people, including 9 unemployed. These people were mostly employees (82%) and most worked outside the commune (78%). At the end of 2015 there were a total of 12 business enterprises in the commune: 6 in agriculture, 1 in construction, 2 in trade, transport, and services, and 3 in Administration, education, health, or social services. 3 Agricultural enterprises and one administrative establishment employed staff.

According to the Departmental Observatory of Tourism, tourism is important for the commune with between one and five tourists accommodated per capita. In the total absence of any housing facilities these are second homes that can accommodate tourists. (the 42 second homes account for over a third of the communal housing and have 208 beds).

== Culture and heritage ==
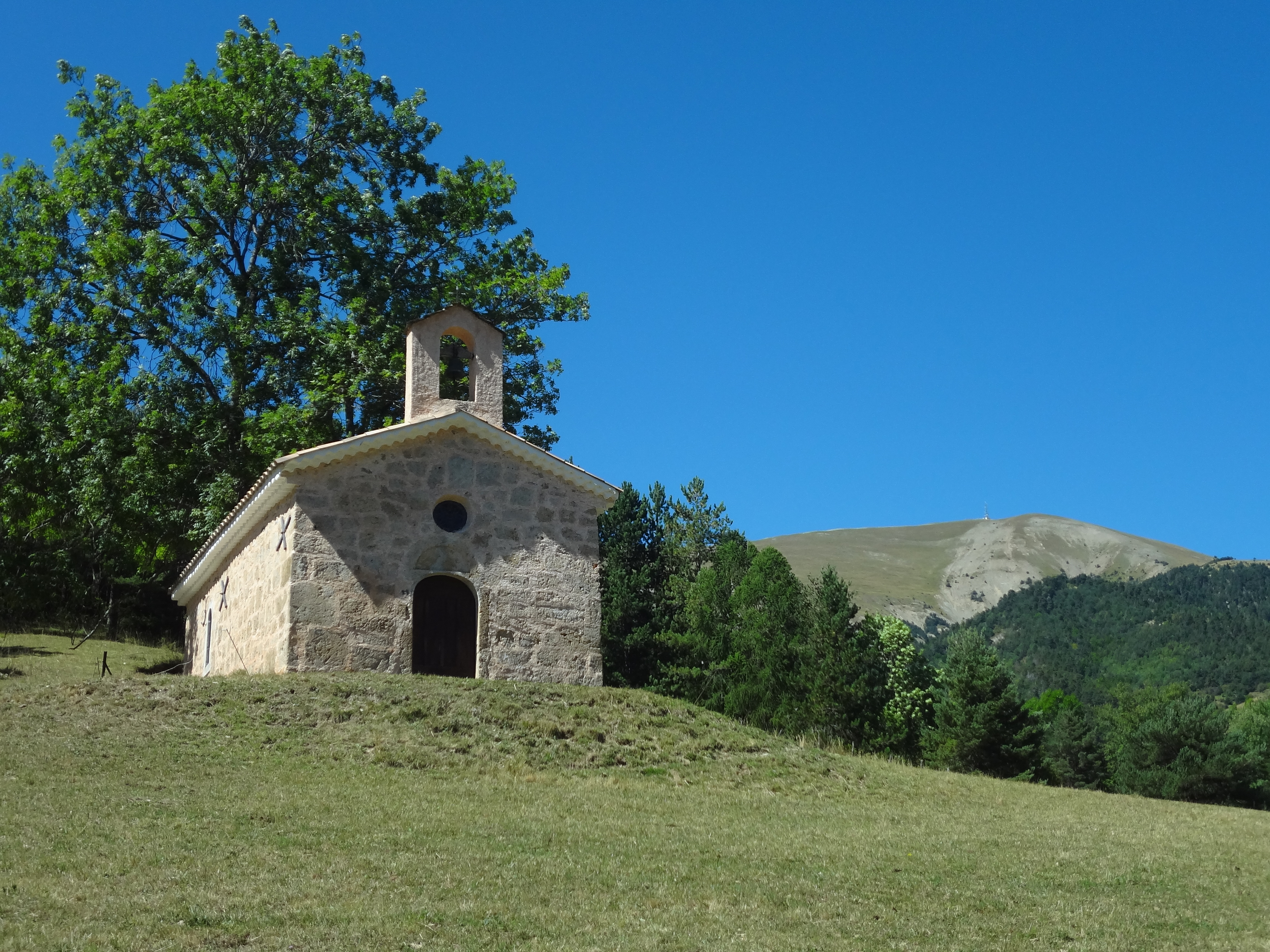
Chapel of Saint Anne Labouret on the pass road. In the background is the Blayeul (2189 m)

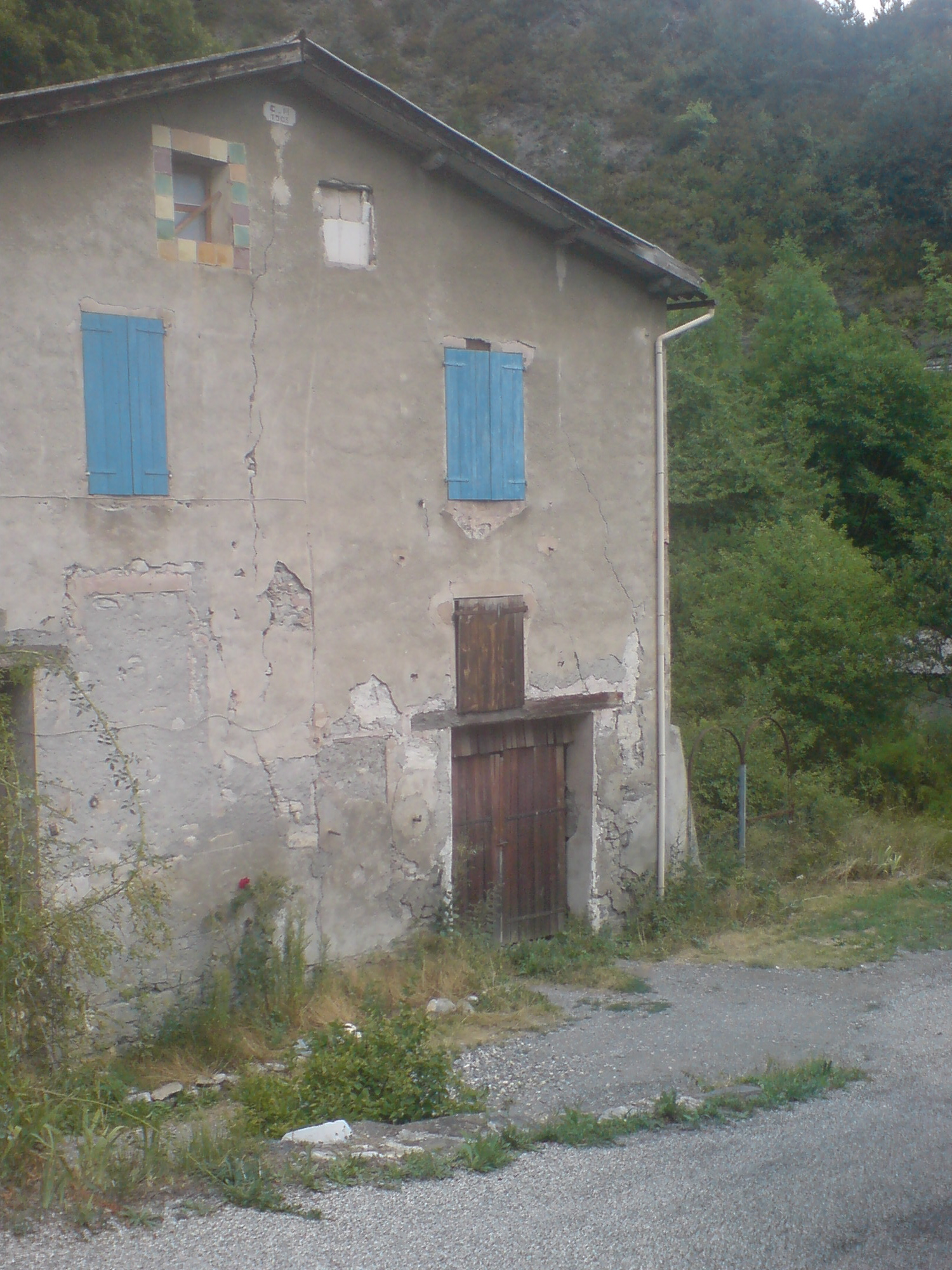
The old coaching inn

There were two coaching inns on the Labouret road, one in the village and one at the foot of the pass whose slope was very difficult.

=== Religious heritage ===
- The Chapel of Saint-Blaise at Clucheret contains three items that are registered as historical objects:
  - A Paten (18th century)
  - A Painting: Saint Blaise (19th century)
  - A Processional cross (1683)
- The Chapel of Sainte-Anne at Labouret contains one item that is registered as historical objects:
  - A Chalice with Paten (18th century)
- The Church of Notre-Dame-de-l’Assomption at Beaujeu contains several items that are registered as historical objects:
  - A Statue: Saint Eloi (18th century)
  - A Painting: Sainte Famille (18th century)
  - A Statue: Virgin and child (18th century)
  - A Painting: Donation of the Rosary (18th century)
  - A Tabernacle (17th century)
- The Church of Saint-Pierre-des-Auches at Saint-Pierre contains several items that are registered as historical objects:
  - A Pulpit (19th century)
  - A Painting: Donation of the Rosary (1839)
  - A Statue: Saint Joseph (19th century)
  - A Statue: Virgin and child (19th century)
  - A Processional cross (18th century)
  - A Painting: Christ on the Cross (1830)
  - A Statue: Saint Peter (18th century)
  - A Painting: Saints Roch and Sebastian (1683)
  - A Chest (13th century)

== See also ==
- Communes of the Alpes-de-Haute-Provence department
