= Communauté d'agglomération Provence-Alpes =

Communauté d'agglomération in Alpes-de-Haute-Provence, France

Provence-Alpes
- Communauté d'agglomération
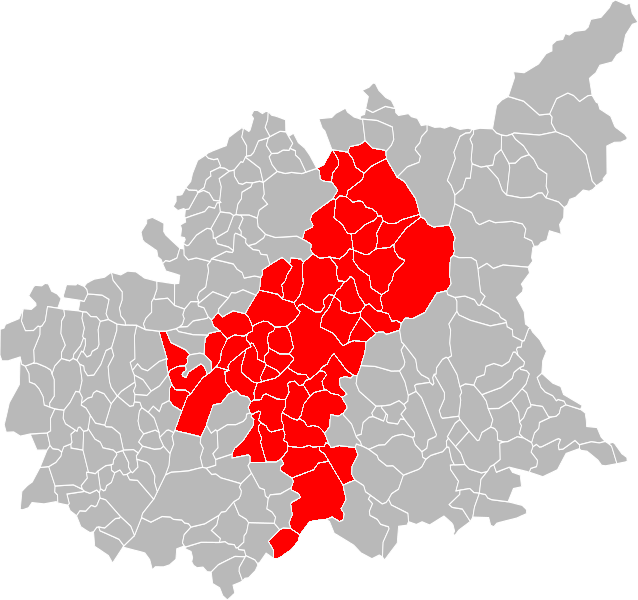
- Location within the Alpes-de-Haute-Provence
- Country: France
- Region: Provence-Alpes-Côte d'Azur
- Department: Alpes-de-Haute-Provence
- No. of communes: {{{nbcomm}}}

Government
  - President (2020–2026): Patricia Granet-Brunello (DVG)
- Area: 1,574 km^{2} (608 sq mi)
- Population (2018): 47,382
  - Density: 30.10/km^{2} (77.97/sq mi)

The Communauté d'agglomération Provence-Alpes or Provence-Alpes Agglomération is a French agglomeration community, created on 21 October 2016 (with effect from 1 January 2017), located in the department of Alpes-de-Haute-Provence, in region Provence-Alpes-Côte d'Azur. Its seat is Digne-les-Bains. Its area is 1574.0 km^{2}. Its population was 47,382 in 2018, which is 29% of the population of Alpes-de-Haute-Provence.

It is one of the two agglomeration communities of the Alpes-de-Haute-Provence, the other being Durance-Luberon-Verdon Agglomération.

== History ==
Law no. 2015-991 of August 7, 2015 on the new territorial organization of the Republic, known as the NOTRe law, imposed their own taxation on public institutions with a population between 5,000 and 15,000 for inter-municipal cooperation.

The departmental inter-municipal cooperation plan (SDCI), unveiled in October 2015, proposed the merger of five communautés de communes: Asse-Bléone-Verdon, Pays de Seyne, Moyenne-Durance, Duyes et Bléone and Haute Bléone.

The withdrawal of Saint-Julien-d'Asse from the community of municipalities, so that it joins Durance Luberon Verdon agglomeration community (also called the Manosquin pôle), having been rejected, no other modification was made after the meeting of the departmental intercommunal cooperation commission on March 21, 2016, following the adoption of the SDCI on March 25.

The urban community was created by the prefectural n^{o} 2016-294-002 of 21 October 2016 with the name “Provence-Alpes Agglomération”.

== Geography ==
=== Location ===
The agglomération community is located from north to south of the department of Alpes-de-Haute-Provence, in the arrondissement of Digne-les-Bains.

=== Composition ===
Provence-Alpes Agglomération

The agglomeration community is made up of 46 communes:

1. Aiglun
2. Archail
3. Auzet
4. Barles
5. Barras
6. Beaujeu
7. Beynes
8. Bras-d'Asse
9. Le Brusquet
10. Le Castellard-Mélan
11. Le Chaffaut-Saint-Jurson
12. Champtercier
13. Château-Arnoux-Saint-Auban
14. Châteauredon
15. Digne-les-Bains
16. Draix
17. Entrages
18. L'Escale
19. Estoublon
20. Ganagobie
21. Hautes-Duyes
22. La Javie
23. Majastres
24. Malijai
25. Mallefougasse-Augès
26. Mallemoisson
27. Marcoux
28. Les Mées
29. Mézel
30. Mirabeau
31. Montclar
32. Moustiers-Sainte-Marie
33. Peyruis
34. Prads-Haute-Bléone
35. La Robine-sur-Galabre
36. Sainte-Croix-du-Verdon
37. Saint-Jeannet
38. Saint-Julien-d'Asse
39. Saint-Jurs
40. Saint-Martin-lès-Seyne
41. Selonnet
42. Seyne
43. Thoard
44. Verdaches
45. Le Vernet
46. Volonne

== Executive ==
=== President ===
Patricia Granet-Brunello (DVG) is the president of the community since 2017.

=== Vice-Presidents ===
	Name	Party	Delegacy
01	Patrick Martellini	PRG	Delegate for finance
02	Francis Hermitte	PS	Delegate for tourism strategy
03	Gilbert Reinaudo	DVG	Delegate for human resources
04	Denis Baille	DVG	Delegate for jobs
05	Patricia Brun	DVG	Delegate for the management of services of collective interest (sport and leisure, early childhood, etc.)
06	Gérard Paul	PCF	Delegate for the collection, treatment and recovery of waste
07	Bernard Teyssier	PS	Delegate for environmental spaces and outdoor facilities
08	Emmanuelle Martin	DVG	Delegate for transport and mobility
09	Philip Nicolosi	DVG	Delegate for economic strategy
10	Claude Fiaert	PS	Delegate for culture and cultural facilities, coordination of events of community interest and communication
11	Benoît Cazères	PS	Delegate for the pooling, development and evolution of skills, and evaluation of public policies
12	Bruno Acciaï	DVD	Delegate for the attractiveness of the territory
13	Patrick Vivos	DVG	Sustainable development delegate
14	Gilles Chatard	DVD	Delegate to the citizen factory and the development council
15	Philippe Pouleau		Delegate to SCOT and PLUI, Social balance of housing
