= Canton of Les Mées =

Coordinates: 44°01′50″N 5°58′38″E

Les Mées
- Former canton
- Interactive map of Les Mées
- Country: France
- Region: Provence-Alpes-Côte d'Azur
- Department: Alpes-de-Haute-Provence
- No. of communes: {{{nbcomm}}}
- Disbanded: 2015
- Area: 215.87 km^{2} (83.35 sq mi)
- Population (2012): 11,795
  - Density: 54.639/km^{2} (141.52/sq mi)

The canton of Les Mées is a former administrative division in southeastern France. It was disbanded following the French canton reorganisation which came into effect in March 2015. It had 11,795 inhabitants (2012).

The canton comprised the following communes:

- Le Castellet
- Entrevennes
- Malijai
- Les Mées
- Oraison
- Puimichel

== Demographics ==
Historical population Canton of Les Mées
| Year | 1962 | 1968 | 1975 | 1982 | 1990 | 1999 |
| Pop. | 5,316 | 6,151 | 6,610 | 7,305 | 8,316 | 9,269 |
| ±% | — | +15.7% | +7.5% | +10.5% | +13.8% | +11.5% |
From the year 1962 on: No double counting – residents of multiple communes (e.g. students and military personnel) are counted only once. Source: INSEE

== See also ==
- Cantons of the Alpes-de-Haute-Provence department
