= Canton of Digne-les-Bains-1 =

Coordinates: 44.09°N 6.23°E

- Canton
- Situation of the canton of Digne-les-Bains-1 in the department of Alpes-de-Haute-Provence
- Country: France
- Region: Provence-Alpes-Côte d'Azur
- Department: Alpes-de-Haute-Provence
- No. of communes: {{{nbcomm}}}
- Population (2023): 12,856
- INSEE code: 0404

The canton of Digne-les-Bains-1 is an administrative division of the Alpes-de-Haute-Provence department, in southeastern France. It was created at the French canton reorganisation which came into effect in March 2015. Its seat is in Digne-les-Bains.

It consists of the following communes:

1. Le Castellard-Mélan
2. Digne-les-Bains (partly)
3. Entrages
4. Hautes-Duyes
5. Marcoux
6. La Robine-sur-Galabre
7. Thoard
