= Aiglun, Alpes-de-Haute-Provence =

Aiglun
- Commune
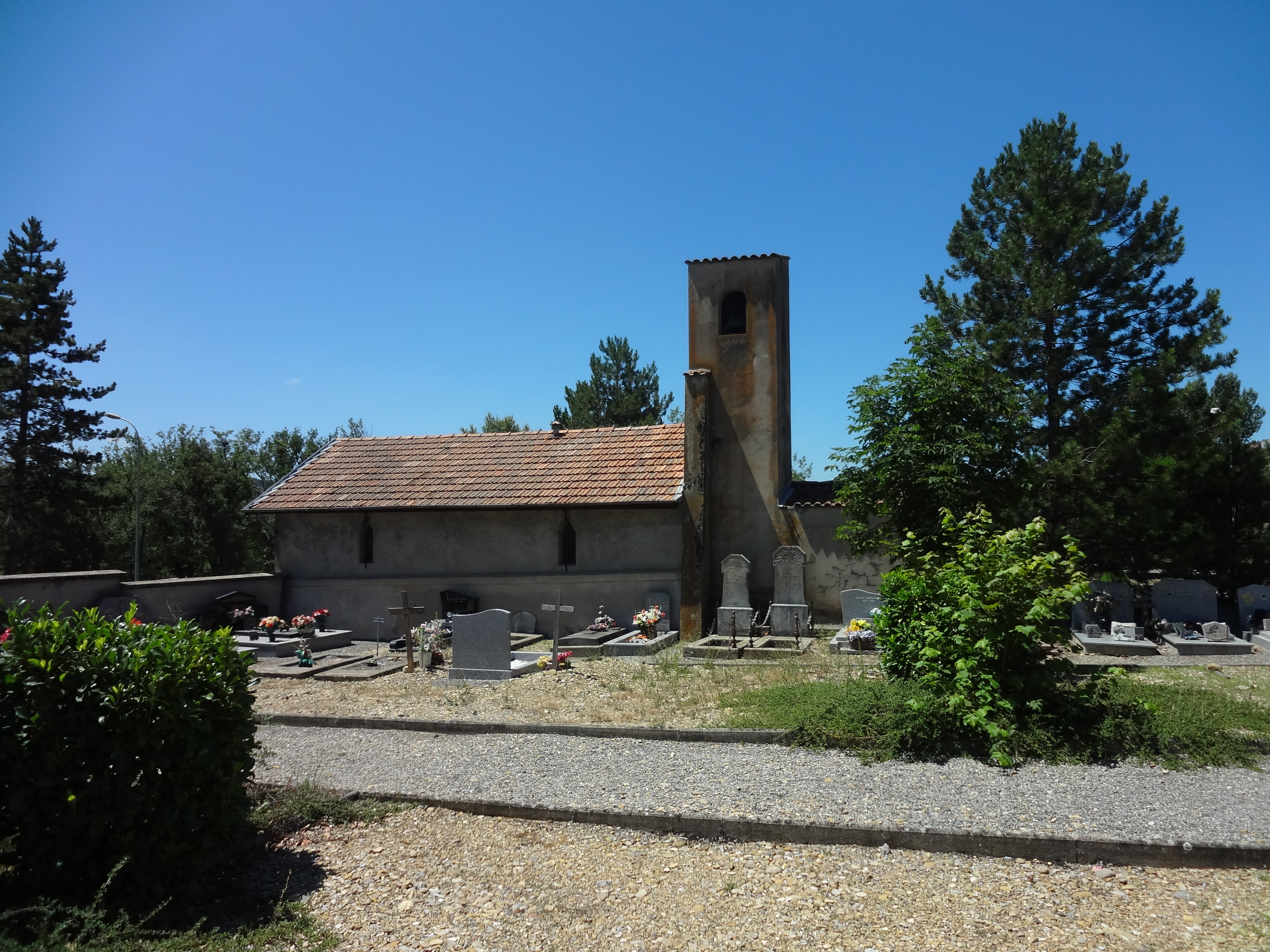

- Coat of arms
- Location of Aiglun
- Location within France Location within Provence-Alpes-Côte d'Azur
- Coordinates: 44°03′16″N 6°08′28″E
- Country: France
- Region: Provence-Alpes-Côte d'Azur
- Department: Alpes-de-Haute-Provence
- Arrondissement: Digne-les-Bains
- Canton: Digne-les-Bains-2
- Intercommunality: Provence-Alpes Agglomération

Government
  - Mayor (2026–32): Jacques Cartiaux
- Area^{1}: 14.89 km^{2} (5.75 sq mi)
- Elevation: 700 m (2,300 ft)
- Highest elevation: 900 m (3,000 ft)
- Lowest elevation: 507 m (1,663 ft)
- Population (2023): 1,399
  - Density: 93.96/km^{2} (243.3/sq mi)
- Time zone: UTC+01:00 (CET)
  - Summer (DST): UTC+02:00 (CEST)
- INSEE/Postal code: 04001 /04510
- ^{1} French Land Register data, which excludes lakes, ponds, glaciers > 1 km^{2} (0.386 sq mi or 247 acres) and river estuaries.

Aiglun (French pronunciation: [ɛɡlœ̃]) is a commune in the Alpes-de-Haute-Provence department in the Provence-Alpes-Côte d'Azur region in southeastern France.

== Geography ==
Aiglun is located about 6 km southeast of Digne following Route nationale N85, which runs mostly parallel to the Bléone river which forms the southeastern border of the commune. Highway N85 continues through the southern part of the commune towards the next town of Malijai. The village lies about 3 km north of the N85 along a country road, the Avenue Marius Autric, which loops through the commune to intersect with Highway D17 outside the southwestern border of the commune. No other major roads run through the commune, and access is via country roads and lanes. Much of the commune is forested, with patches of farmland.

=== Hydrography ===
A large number of streams cover all parts of the commune, most of which flow into the Bléone river on the southeastern border, which is itself a tributary of the Durance river.

=== Localities and hamlets ===
In addition to the village, the town has three other hamlets:

- Les Lavendes
- Les Grees
- Le Thoron

=== Natural and technological hazards ===
All of the 200 communes of the department are in some seismic risk. The canton of Digne-les-Bains-2, to which Aiglun belongs, is zoned 1b (low risk) according to the classification of 1991, based on historical earthquakes, and in Zone 4 (medium risk) according to the probability classification EC8 of 2011. The commune of Aiglun is exposed to three other natural hazards:

- Forest fire
- Flooding (in the valley of the Bléone )
- Landslide: the community is almost entirely classified medium-to-high hazard.

Aiglun is also exposed to a risk of technological origin: the transport of hazardous materials by rail, road and pipeline. As regards the railway, the St. Auban to Digne line is closed and so there is no traffic. The National Highway 85 can be used for the road transport of dangerous goods. Finally, the pipeline for feeding natural gas to Digne passes through the commune and is thus an additional risk factor.

The prevention plan for foreseeable natural risks (PPR) of the commune was approved in 2006 for flood risk, landslide and earthquake and the Dossier of communal information on major risks (DICRIM) has existed since 2011.

The commune has been the site of several natural disasters: an earthquake in 1984, floods and mudslides in 1996 and 2001, drought in 1989, 1990, and 1998, and landslides in 1996.

The earthquake of 19 June 1984 had its epicentre in Aiglun and a macro-seismic intensity of VI on the Medvedev–Sponheuer–Karnik scale (MSK). On 25 July 2001 a storm with hail and rainfall of 150mm in three hours caused floods.

=== Toponymy ===
The name of the town appears for the first time in texts of 1195 (according to Rostaing and Nègre) in the form: Aiglezino (and Aygladuno in 1319). The term is based on the Latin aquila meaning "eagle" and the Gallic dunum meaning "height" and would therefore mean "height of the eagle". According to Fénié, it has two oronymic roots: *akw-il plus the Celtic dunum.

== History ==
In ancient times, the Bodiontiques (or Bodiontici) inhabited the valley of the Bléone, and so it was Gallic people who lived in what is now the commune of Aiglun. The Bodiontiques, who were defeated by Augustus Caesar at the same time as other people living in the area of the Tropaeum Alpium (from 14 BC to 14 AD), were attached to the Roman province of Alpes-Maritimes at its creation. The Roman road linking Sisteron to Vence crossed the territory of the present commune. Some Gallo-Roman tombs have been found.

The community of Aiglun was under the Viguerie of Digne and the church of the Bishop of Digne who received income related to the church. In return he provided his canons. On the secular side, the village was divided between multiple lords (similar to feudal barons) which by 1315 had reached 22 in number. The village was an ancient fortress called castrum de Aglenio in the Middle Ages.

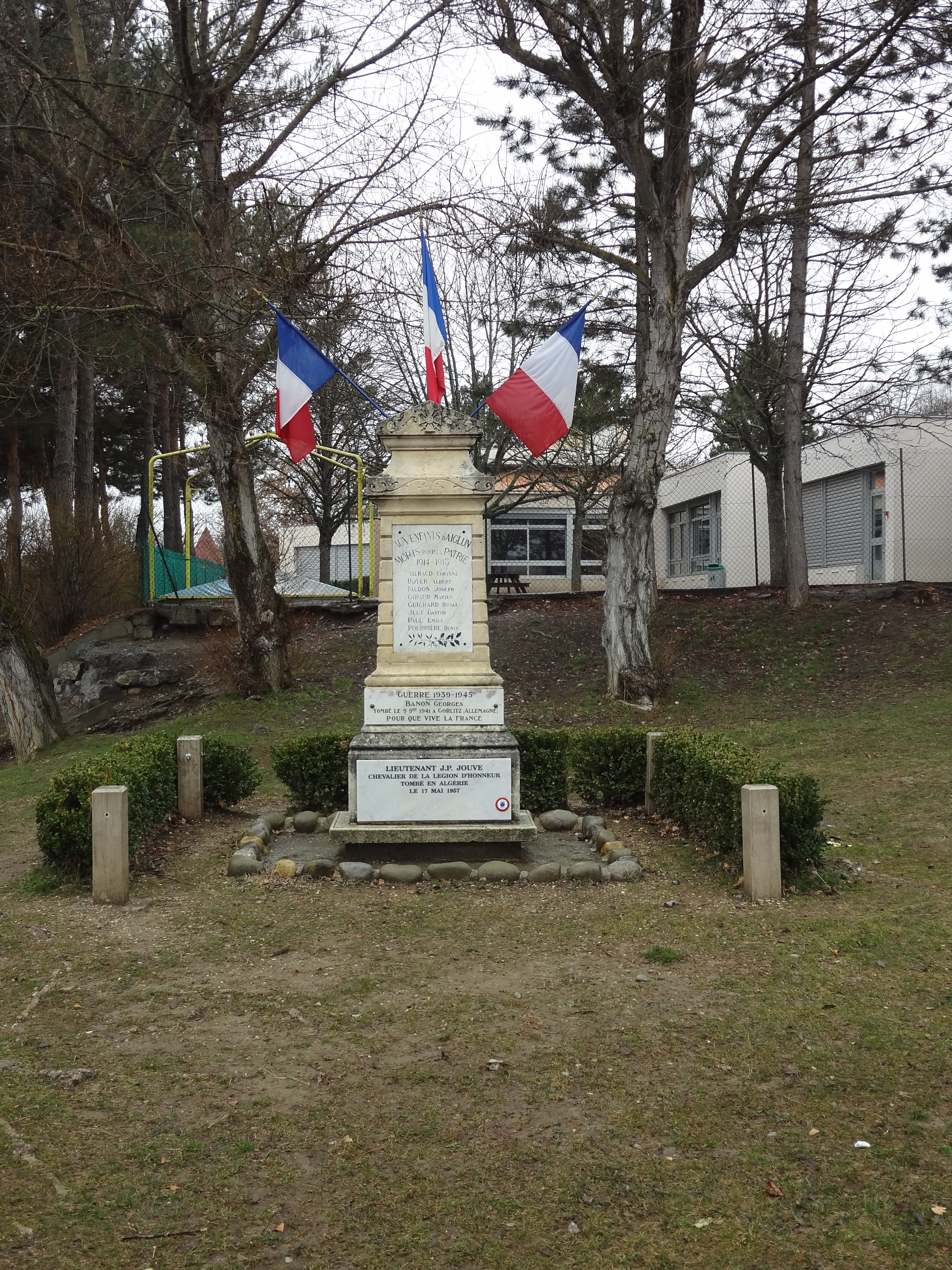
War Memorial of the Commune of Aiglun

At the end of the Second World War, the Liberation of Aiglun was marked by the passage of a column of the U.S. 36th Infantry Division on 19 August 1944, coming from Malijai as reinforcements to secondary column stopped at Digne, to outflank the German garrison at Digne.

Until the middle of the 20th century, grapevines were cultivated in the commune on 55 hectares of land for local consumption. Part of the production was sold to Digne. This activity has now disappeared.

== Heraldry ==
Arms of Aiglun	Blazon: Azure, Fess of Or charged with three eagles of sable.

== Transport ==
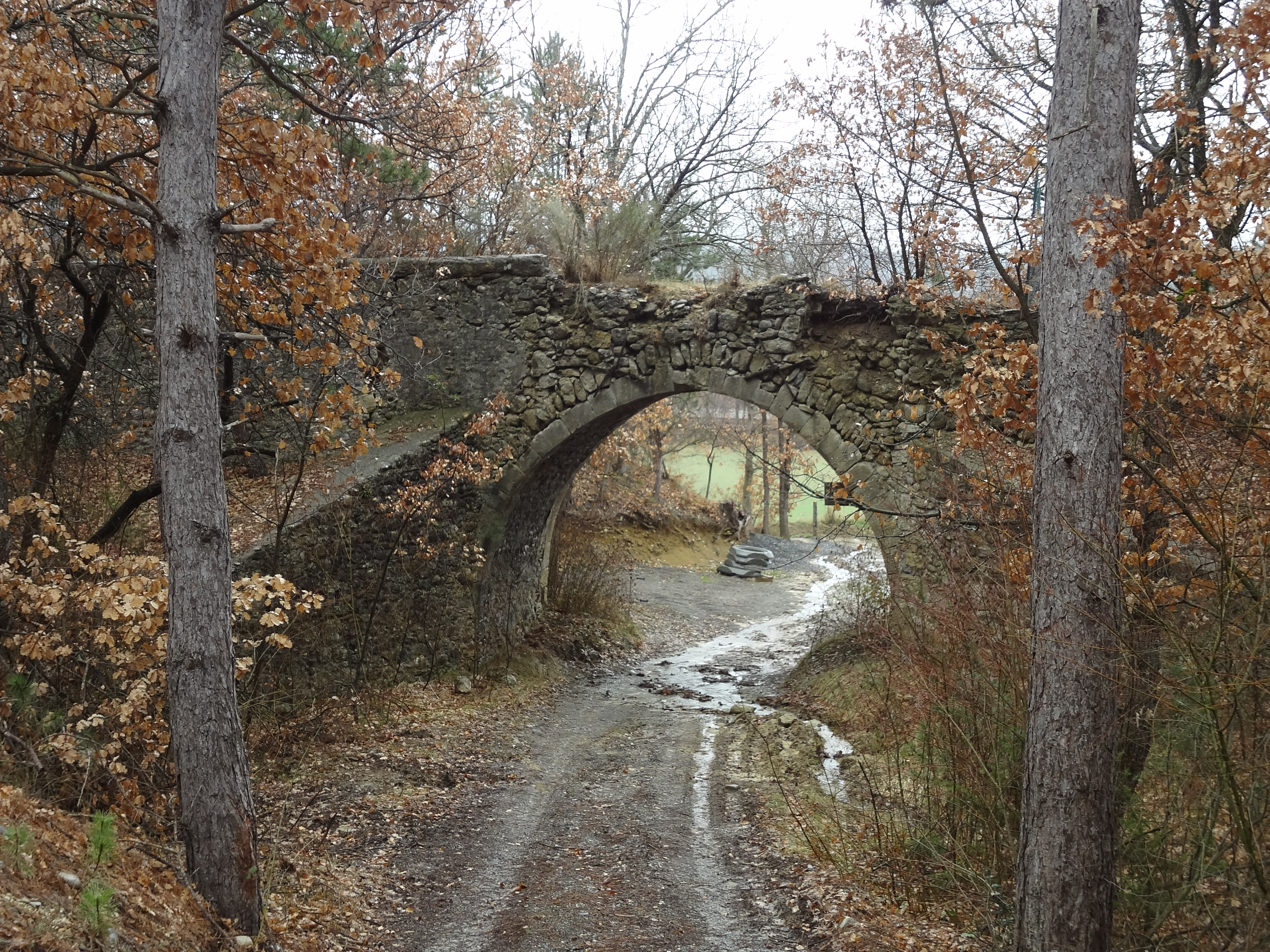
The old railway line

The railway line from Saint-Auban to Digne passed through the town but has been closed since 1991.

== Economy ==
In 2020, the labour force was 594 persons, with 49 unemployed (8.3%). The workers are mostly employed (85.5%). Most inhabitants work outside the commune (82.9%).

As of 31 December 2020, companies based in the municipality were mainly shops and services (34 of 113 establishments) and 28 companies in the construction sector.

=== Agriculture ===
The number of farms has increased only slightly in the 2000 decade, from 7 to 8 in 10 years, including four field crop farms, sheep farms, and polyculture farms. From 1988 to 2000, the agricultural area has increased from 267 to 415 hectares, of which only 56 hectares are for cereals, and almost none for livestock. During the course of this change the amount of agricultural land used doubled in the 2000s to 886 hectares.

There were no olive trees in the commune at the beginning of the 19th century. Currently, there are a few small areas with olive groves with less than 1,000 plants.

=== Industry ===
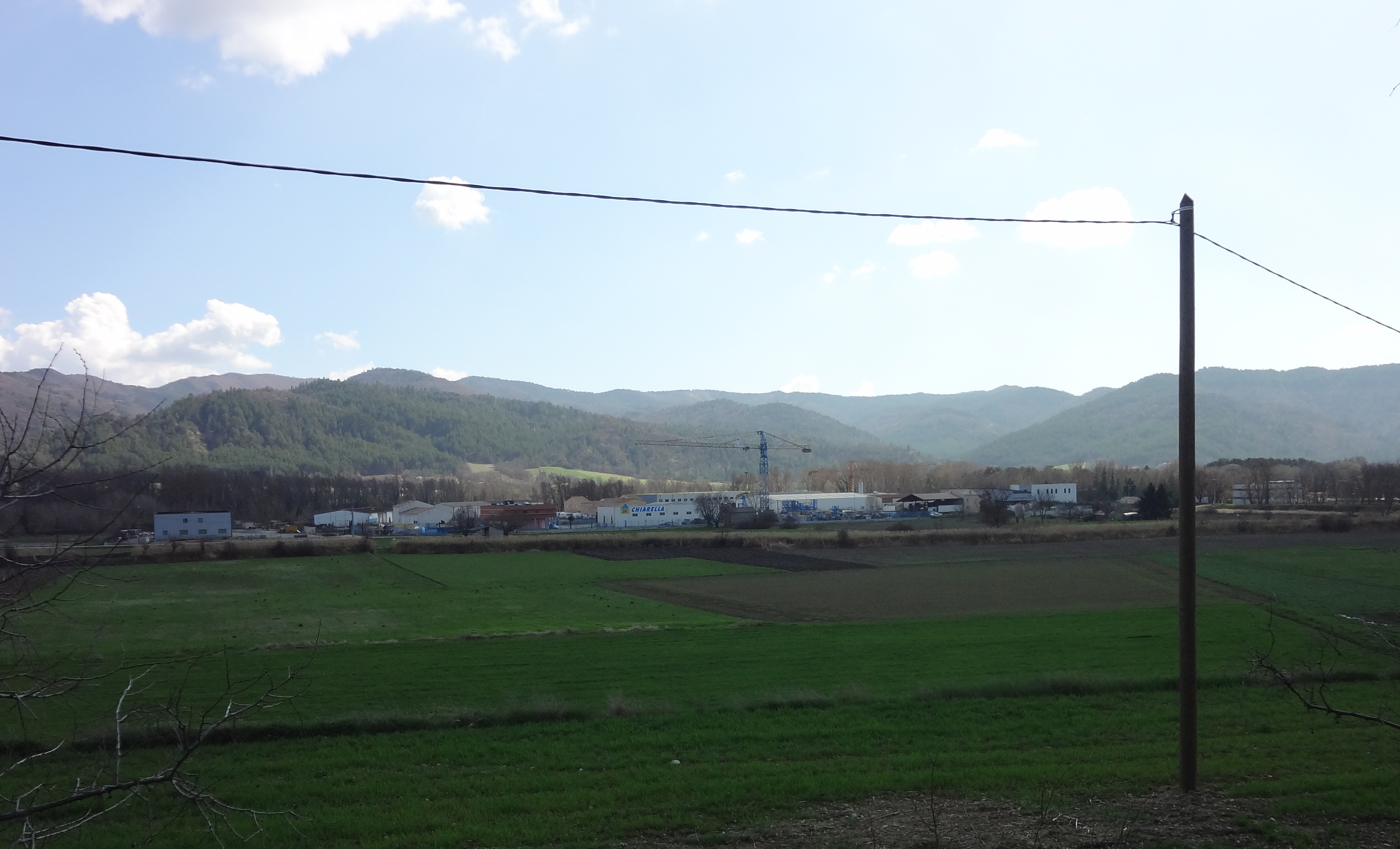
Bléone area, the main industrial zone of Aiglun

In late 2020, the secondary sector (industry and construction) had 30 different establishments.

Two of the largest employers in the town within this sector are:

- Cosepi France, (Building and Public works), with 40 employees
- Martin, (road transport), with 32 employees.

=== Service activities ===
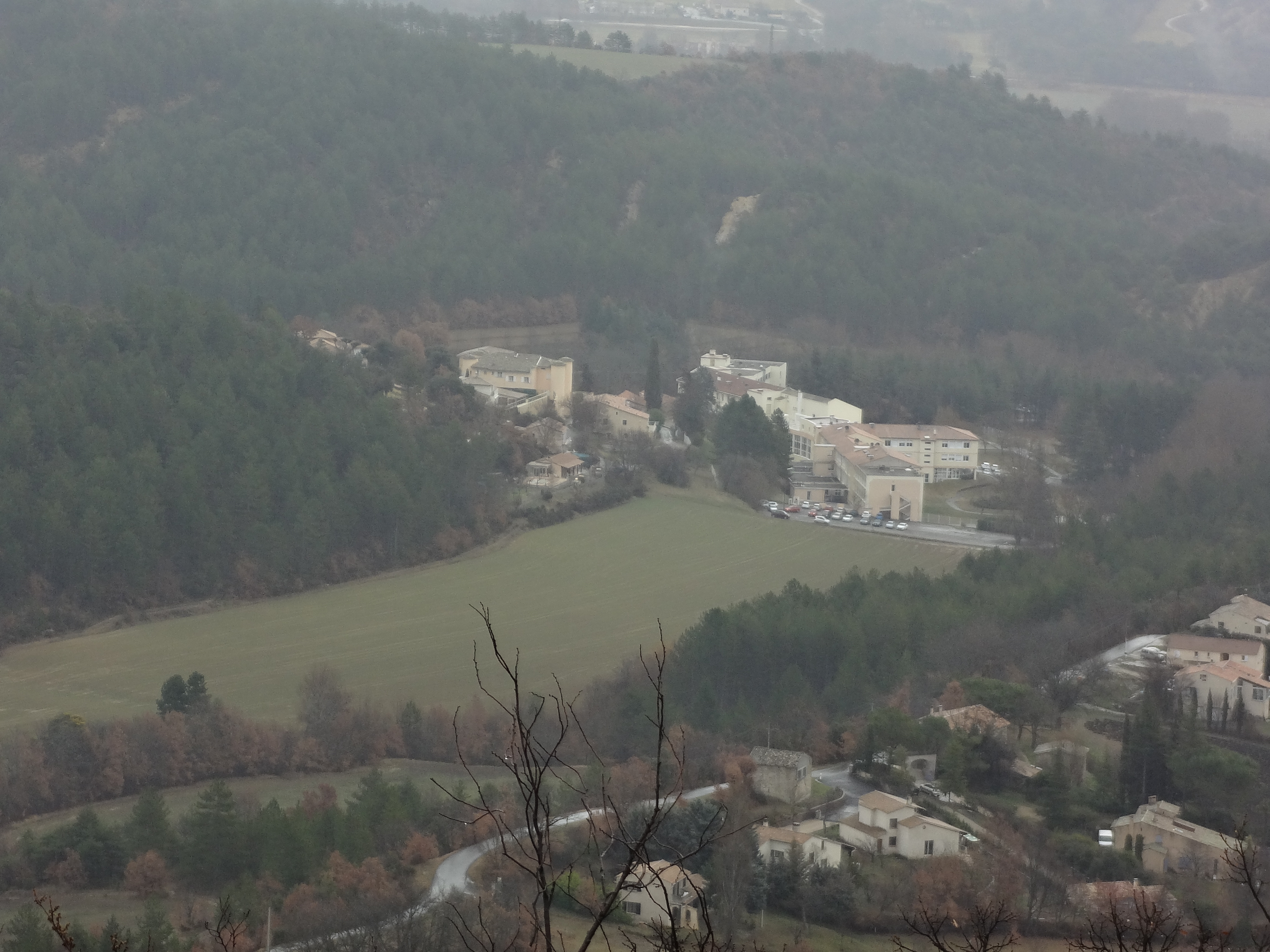
Carmelite Hospital at Aiglun

In December 2020, the tertiary sector (trades and services) had 52 establishments, plus 14 administrative establishments and public services. There is no tourist accommodation in the commune. As of 2020, 5.6% of the houses are holiday homes.

Two of the largest employers in the commune are responsible for service activities:

- Office Centre, a secretarial service, which employs 10 people
- IGH group, which is a Carmelite specialized clinic for rehabilitation

== Administration ==
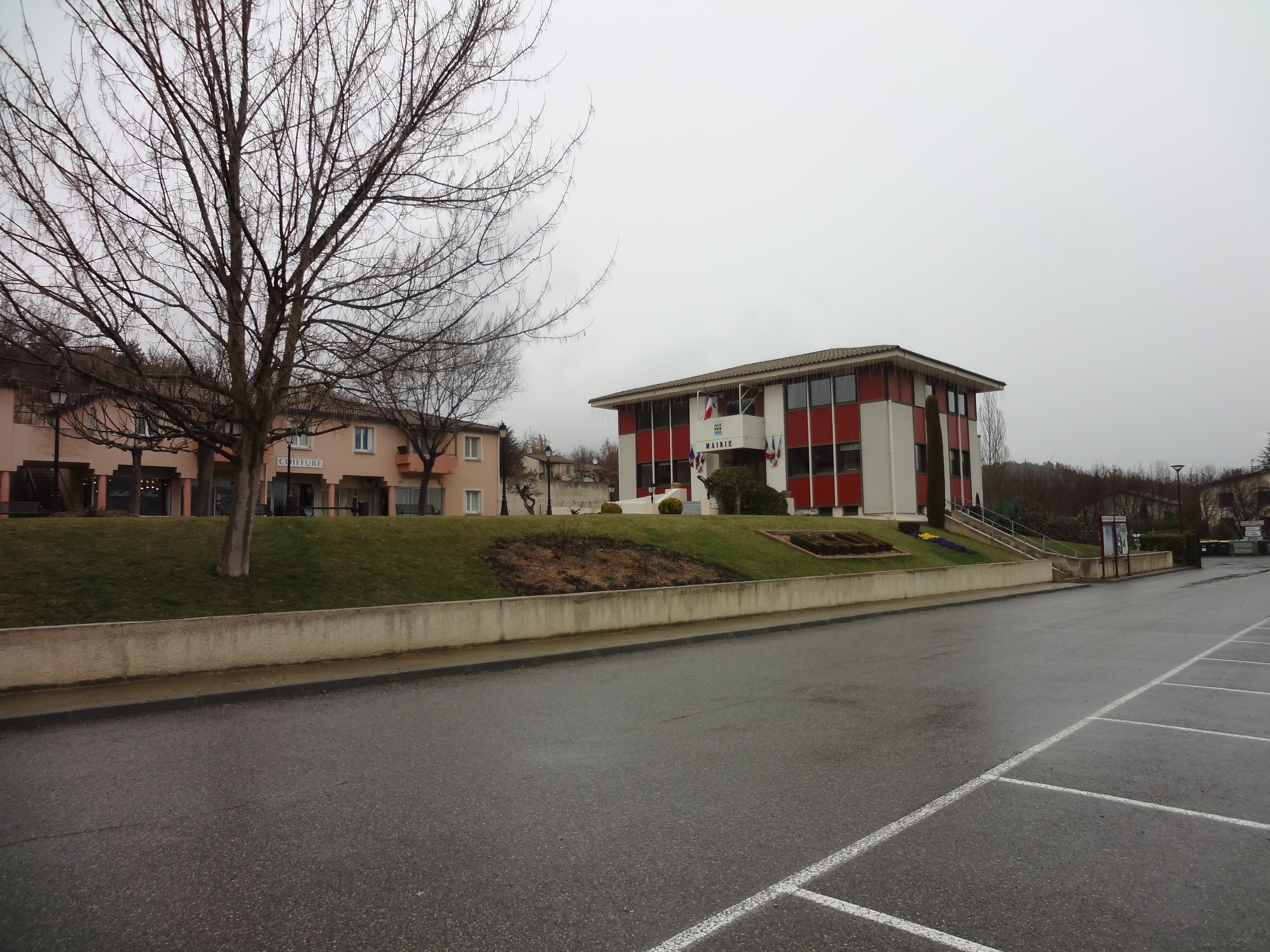
The modern Town Hall at Aiglun

=== List of mayors ===
The mayoral election was an innovation of the French Revolution of 1789. From 1790 to 1795, mayors were elected by suffrage for 2 years. From 1795 to 1800 there was no mayor, the town simply designated a municipal official who was delegated to the Municipality of the canton.

In 1799–1800, the Consulate returned to the election of mayors who were then appointed by the central government. This system was maintained by the following regimes, with the exception of the Second Republic (1848-1851). After maintaining the authoritarian system, the Third Republic by liberalizing the law for the administration of communes on 5 April 1884: the municipal council was to be elected by universal suffrage and they to elect the mayor from among their members.

List of Successive Mayors of Aiglun

From	To	Name	Party
2001	2020	Daniel Jugy	DVD
2020	2026	Michel Audran	
2026	incumbent	Jacques Cartiaux	

=== Intercommunality ===
Aiglun has been a member of the Agglomeration Community Provence-Alpes-Agglomération since 1 January 2017.

=== Budget and taxation ===
The taxation of households and businesses in Aiglun in 2009
Tax	Communal portion	Inter-communal portion	Departmental portion	Regional portion
Residential Tax (TH)	11.07%	0.00%	5.53%	0.00%
Property Tax on Buildings (TFPB)	29.00%	0.00%	14.49%	2.36%
Property Tax on Empty Land (TFPNB)	60.00%	0.00%	47.16%	8.85%
Business Tax (TP)	13.87%*	0.00%	47.16%	8.85%

The regional share of the property tax is not applicable. The business tax was replaced in 2010 by:

- the land premium on companies (CFE) on the rental value of their property and
- the contribution of the added value of enterprises (CAVE)

(both of these form the territorial economic contribution).

=== Education ===
The town has a primary school.

== Population ==
Historical population

Year	Pop.	±% p.a.
1793	313	—
1831	374	+0.47%
1851	360	−0.19%
1872	325	−0.49%
1901	239	−1.05%
1926	174	−1.26%
1946	251	+1.85%
1962	162	−2.70%
1968	174	+1.20%

Year	Pop.	±% p.a.
1975	371	+11.42%
1982	713	+9.78%
1990	1,011	+4.46%
1999	1,038	+0.29%
2007	1,193	+1.75%
2012	1,352	+2.53%
2017	1,440	+1.27%
2023	1,399	−0.48%

Source: EHESS and INSEE

== Sights ==
The town hall has a vase (19th century) which is listed as an historical object.

The Romanesque church of Saint Mary Magdalene, whose nave is dated to 1555, is at Old Aiglun. Its construction used anachronistic techniques such as:

- a semicircular portal
- the nave is vaulted with a broken support
- the choir has a flat apse, vaulted lower than the nave

The church contains many items which have been listed as historical objects:

- A baptismal font (16th century)
- A painting of the Virgin and child with a bishop and a clerk in a scene of healing (17th century)
- A statue of Saint Joseph (19th century)
- A retable (17th century)
- A cope (19th century)
- A chasuble, stole, and maniple (19th century)
- A huméral veil (19th century)
- A painting with frame: Bishop (17th century)

The cemetery church contains many items that are listed as historical objects:

- A statue of Saint Joseph (17th century)
- A retable on the main altar and its painting of the crucifixion (16th century) in an archaic style.
- A processional cross (16th century)
- A crucifix (16th century)
- A crucifix (18th century)
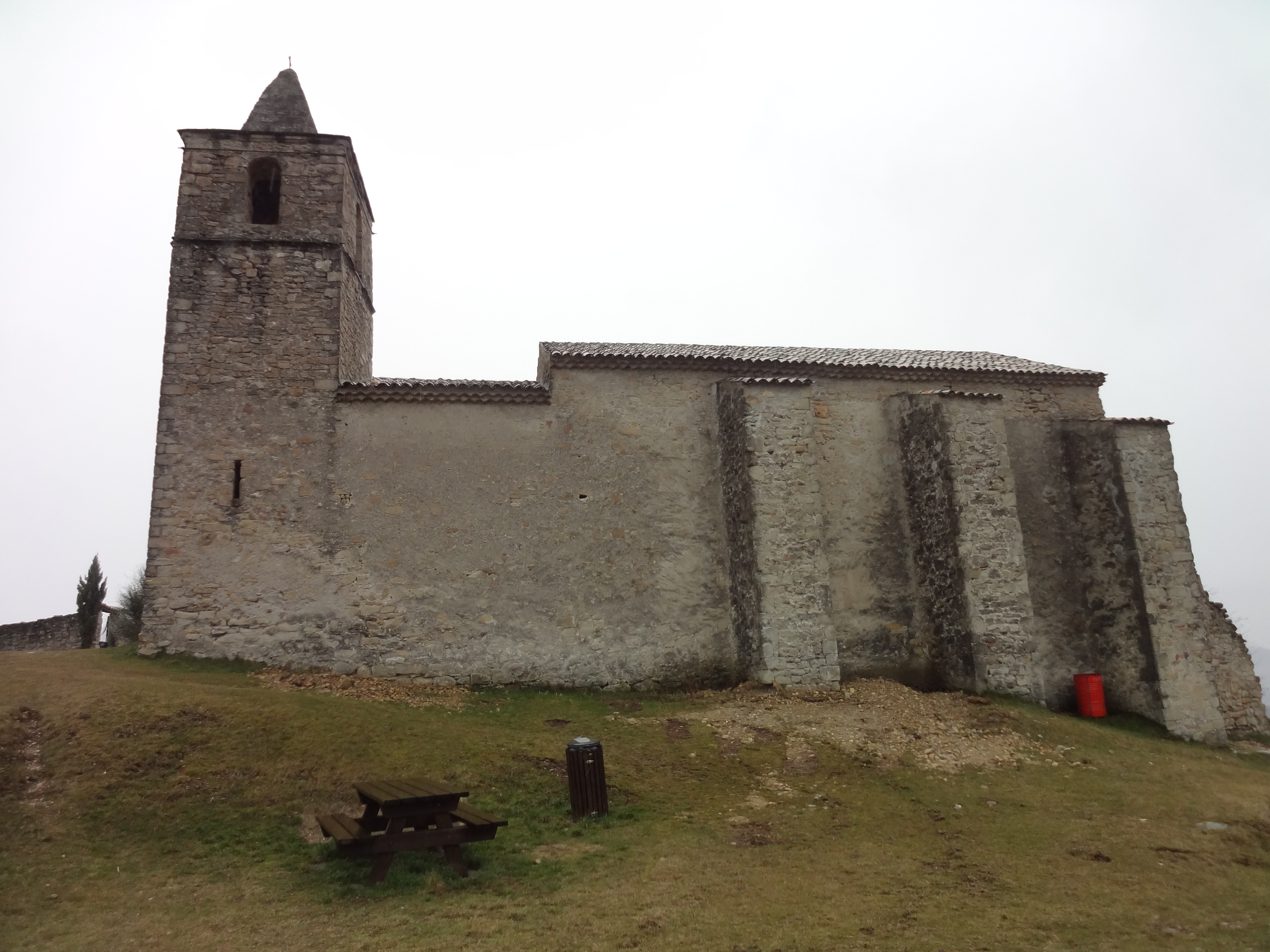
North facade of the church of St. Mary Magdalene without openings, typical of the alpine style

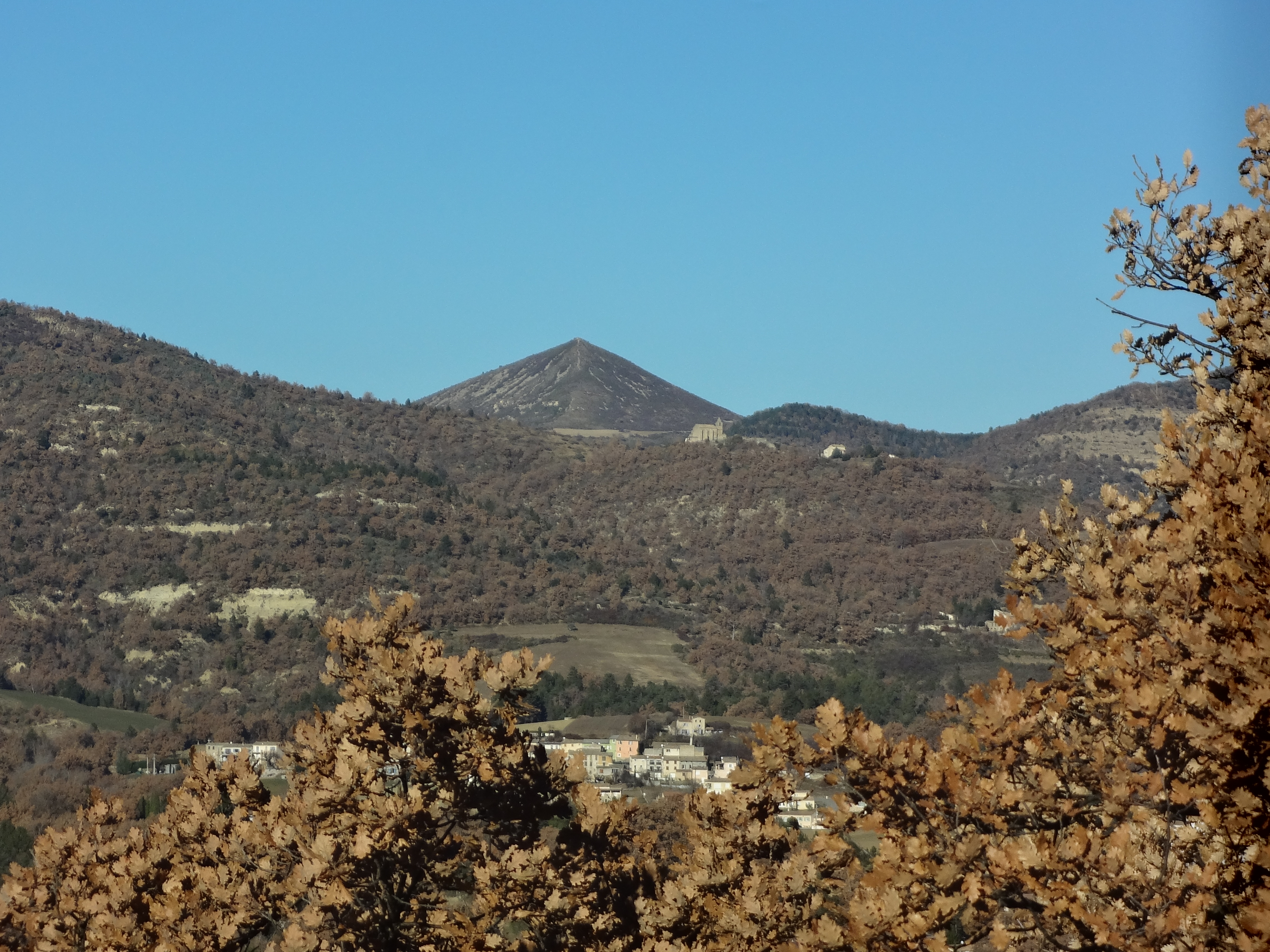
Panoramic view of the Saint Mary Magdelene Church (The conical hill is in Champtercier.)

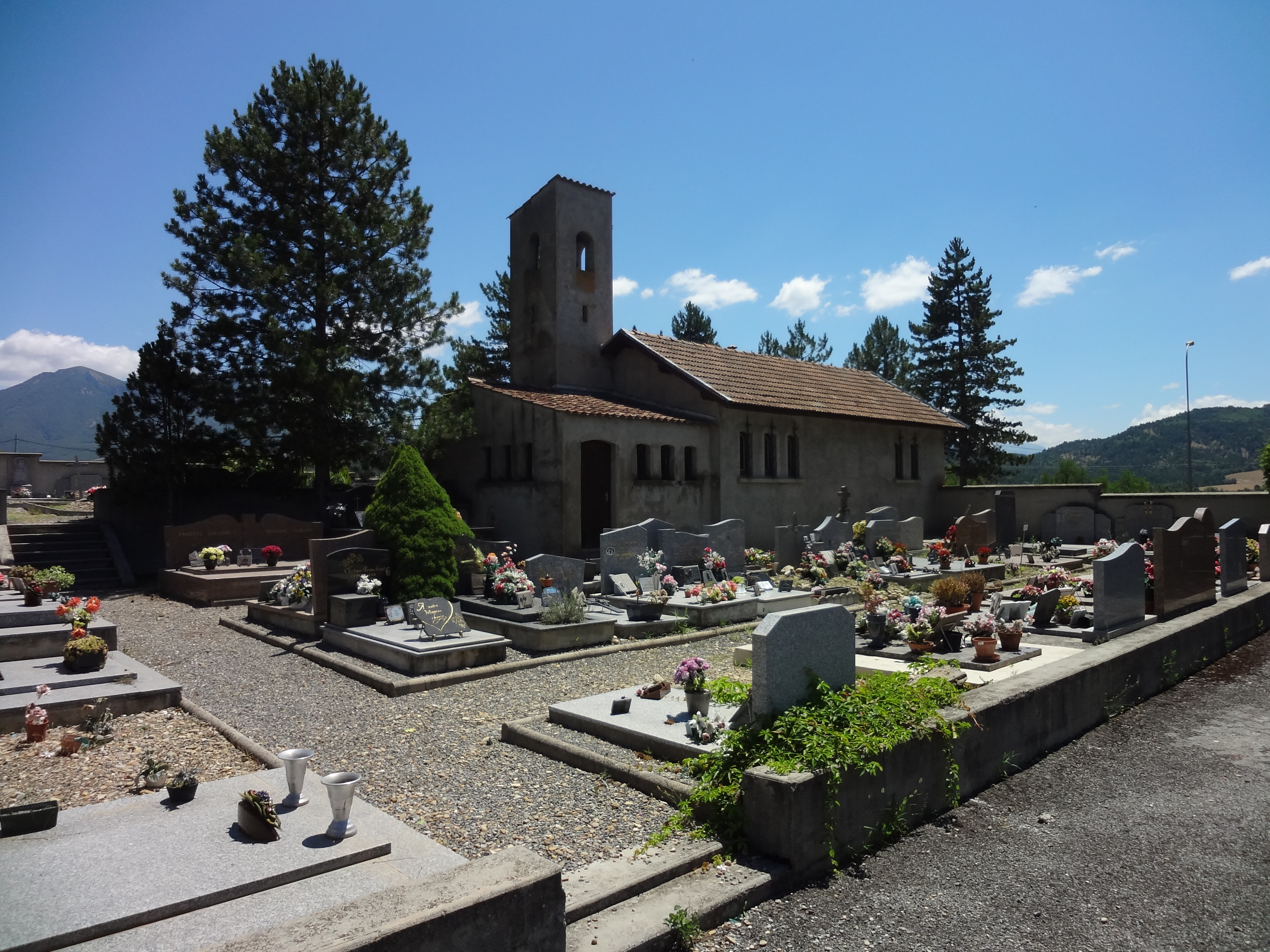
Chapel at the modern cemetery

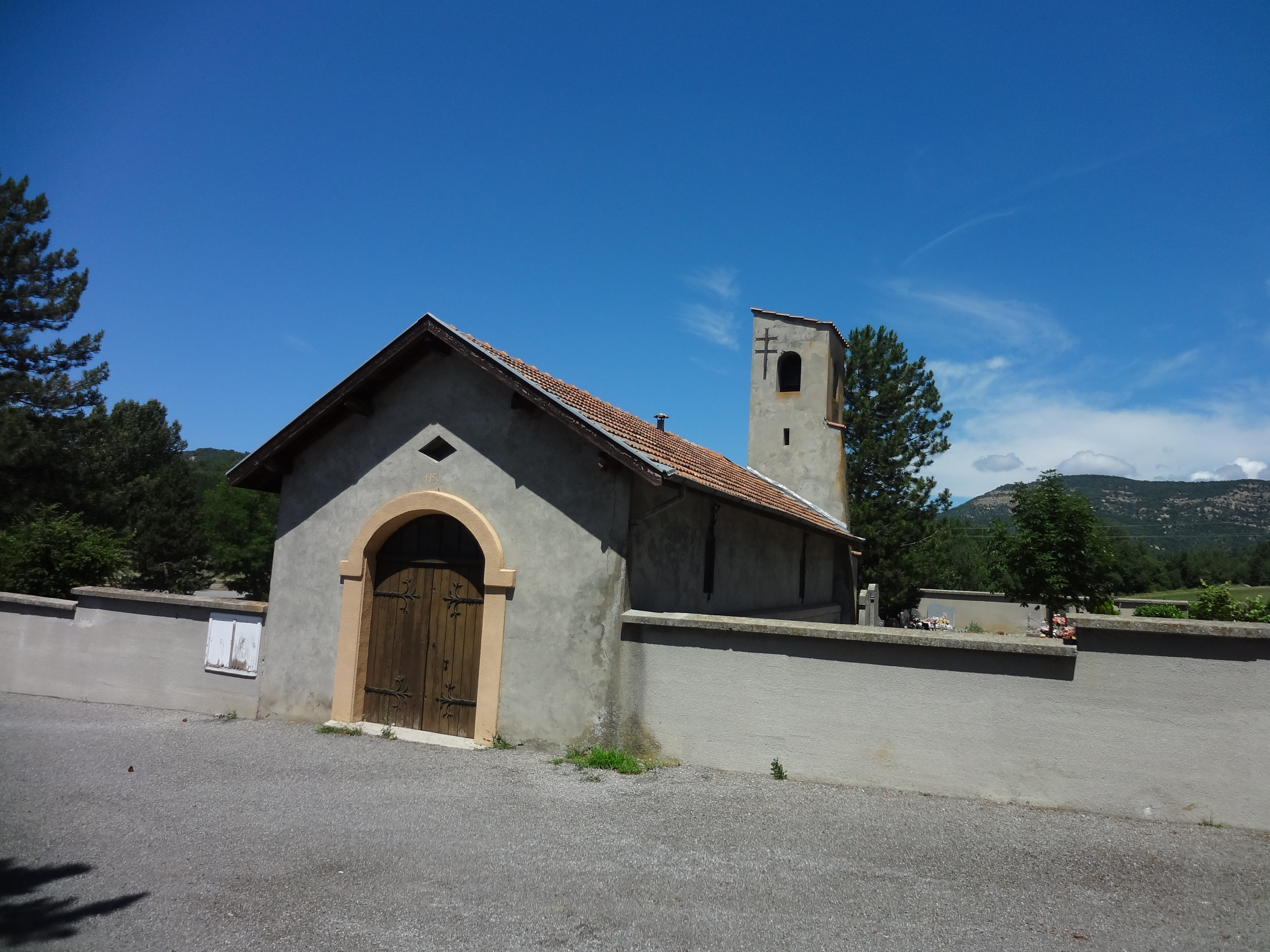
The facade of the chapel

The chapel of Saint John is on the road leading to Saint John, connecting the town centre to Old Aiglun. This was probably the first parish church in the community during the High Middle Ages. It was abandoned in the second half of the 19th century.

The modern village had a new church in 1974, whose patron saint is Saint Delphine.

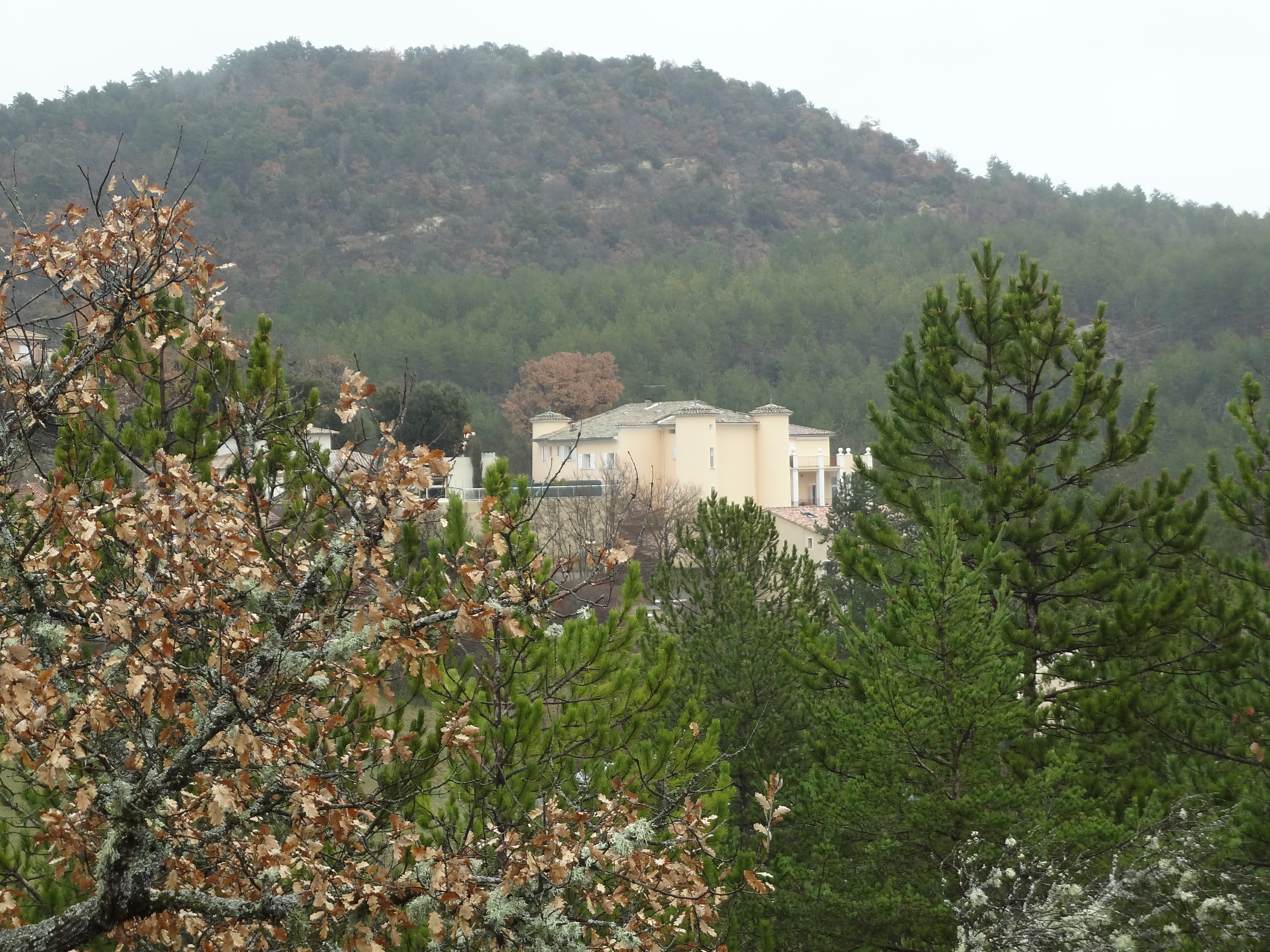
the Chateau of Villeneuve

The chateau of Villeneuve in Aiglun dates to the 17th century. It is a large rectangular building with turrets at each corner. A clinic was installed there in 1935. In the village, the old castle is in a state of disrepair.

In the village, a few houses date to the 17th century.

== See also ==
- Communes of the Alpes-de-Haute-Provence department
