= Canton of Moustiers-Sainte-Marie =

Coordinates: 43°50′54″N 6°13′19″E

Moustiers-Sainte-Marie
- Former canton
- Interactive map of Moustiers-Sainte-Marie
- Country: France
- Region: Provence-Alpes-Côte d'Azur
- Department: Alpes-de-Haute-Provence
- No. of communes: {{{nbcomm}}}
- Disbanded: 2015
- Area: 202.82 km^{2} (78.31 sq mi)
- Population (2012): 1,168
  - Density: 5.759/km^{2} (14.92/sq mi)

The canton of Moustiers-Sainte-Marie is a former administrative division in southeastern France. It was disbanded following the French canton reorganisation which came into effect in March 2015. It consisted of 3 communes, which joined the canton of Riez in 2015. It had 1,168 inhabitants (2012).

The canton comprised the following communes:

- Moustiers-Sainte-Marie
- La Palud-sur-Verdon
- Saint-Jurs

== Demographics ==
Historical population Canton of Moustiers-Sainte-Marie
Year	1962	1968	1975	1982	1990	1999
Pop.	684	792	840	862	944	1,073
±%	—	+15.8%	+6.1%	+2.6%	+9.5%	+13.7%
From the year 1962 on: No double counting – residents of multiple communes (e.g. students and military personnel) are counted only once. Source: INSEE

== See also ==
- Cantons of the Alpes-de-Haute-Provence department
