= Le Castellard-Mélan =

- Commune
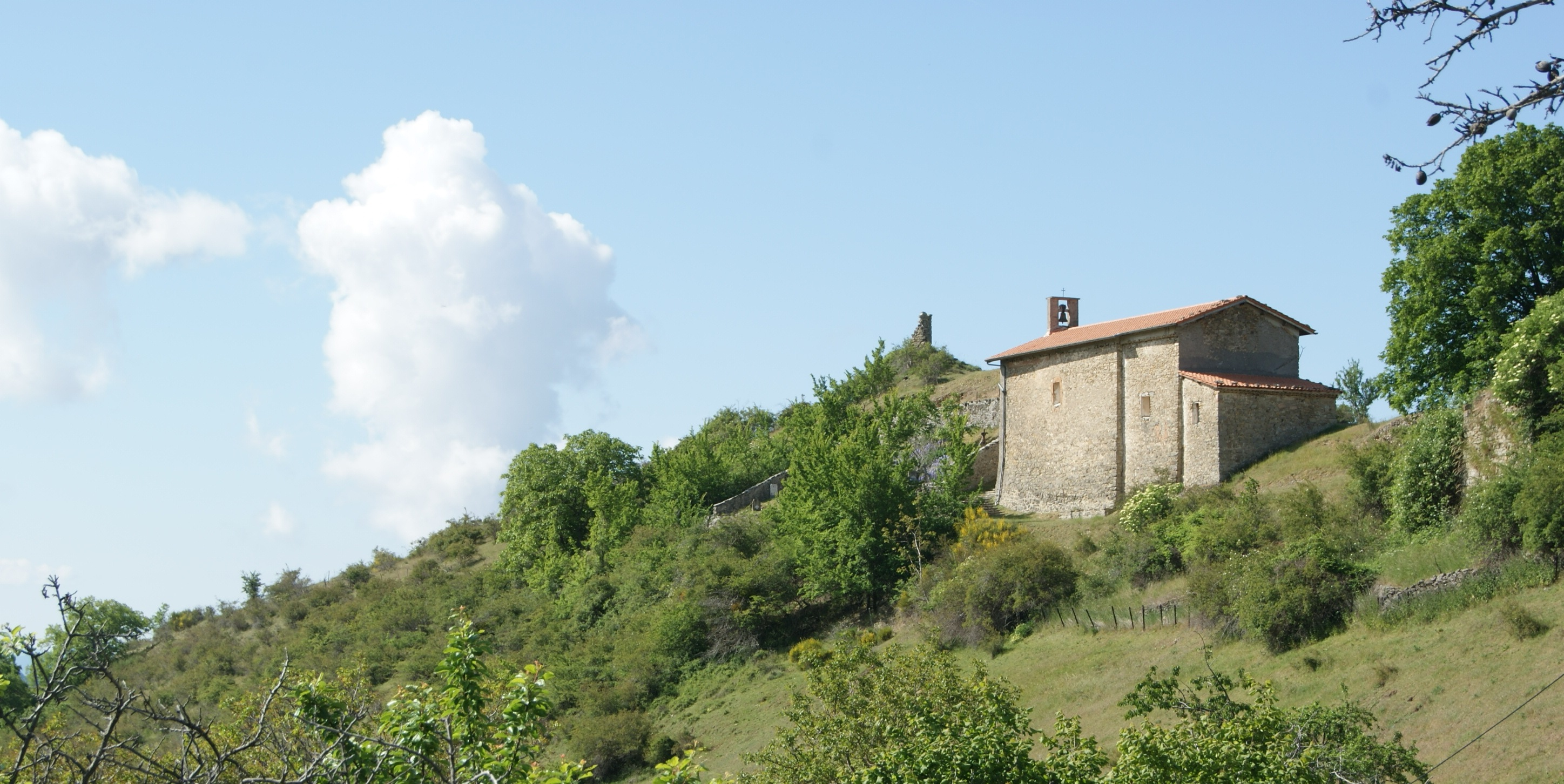
- The chapel of Our Lady, with the ruins of the castle in the background

- Coat of arms
- Location of Le Castellard-Mélan
- Location within France Location within Provence-Alpes-Côte d'Azur
- Coordinates: 44°11′18″N 6°07′32″E
- Country: France
- Region: Provence-Alpes-Côte d'Azur
- Department: Alpes-de-Haute-Provence
- Arrondissement: Digne-les-Bains
- Canton: Digne-les-Bains-1
- Intercommunality: CA Provence-Alpes

Government
  - Mayor (2026–32): Chantal Bardin
- Area^{1}: 25.74 km^{2} (9.94 sq mi)
- Elevation: 1,050 m (3,440 ft)
- Highest elevation: 1,840 m (6,040 ft)
- Lowest elevation: 776 m (2,546 ft)
- Population (2023): 64
  - Density: 2.5/km^{2} (6.4/sq mi)
- Time zone: UTC+01:00 (CET)
  - Summer (DST): UTC+02:00 (CEST)
- INSEE/Postal code: 04040 /04380
- ^{1} French Land Register data, which excludes lakes, ponds, glaciers > 1 km^{2} (0.386 sq mi or 247 acres) and river estuaries.

Le Castellard-Mélan (before 2010: Le Castellard-Melan) is a commune situated in the Alpes-de-Haute-Provence department in southeastern France.

== Population ==
Historical population
Year	Pop.	±% p.a.
1968	57	—
1975	47	−2.72%
1982	55	+2.27%
1990	52	−0.70%
1999	52	+0.00%
2007	69	+3.60%
2012	64	−1.49%
2017	71	+2.10%
2023	80	+2.01%
Source: INSEE

== See also ==
- Communes of the Alpes-de-Haute-Provence department
