= Hautes-Duyes =

- Commune
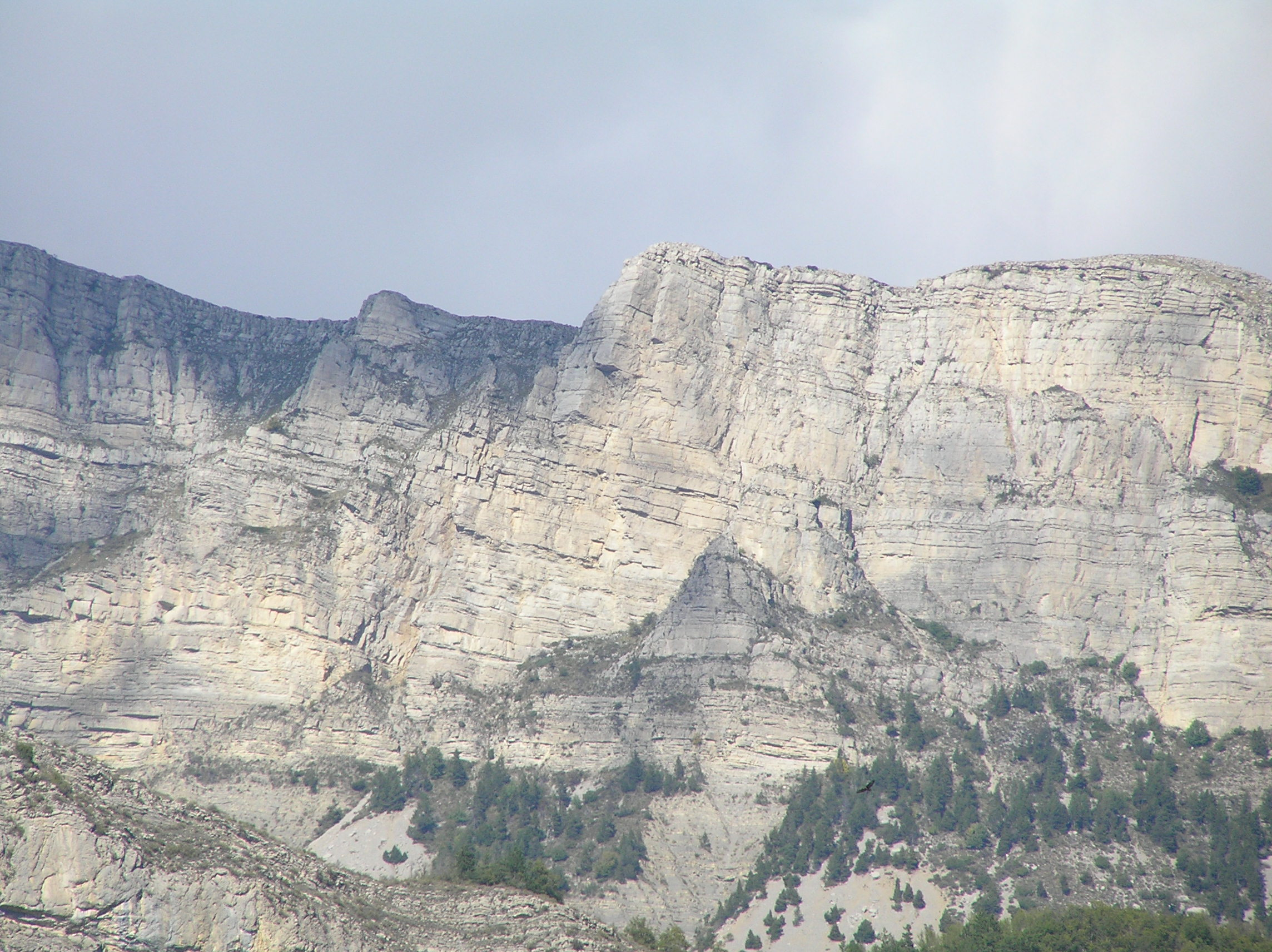
- Cliffs of Guéruen

- Coat of arms
- Location of Hautes-Duyes
- Location within France Location within Provence-Alpes-Côte d'Azur
- Coordinates: 44°10′52″N 6°09′30″E
- Country: France
- Region: Provence-Alpes-Côte d'Azur
- Department: Alpes-de-Haute-Provence
- Arrondissement: Digne-les-Bains
- Canton: Digne-les-Bains-1
- Intercommunality: Provence-Alpes Agglomération

Government
  - Mayor (2026–32): Italo Zanartu-Hayer
- Area^{1}: 22.84 km^{2} (8.82 sq mi)
- Elevation: 800 m (2,600 ft)
- Highest elevation: 1,872 m (6,142 ft)
- Lowest elevation: 776 m (2,546 ft)
- Population (2023): 53
  - Density: 2.3/km^{2} (6.0/sq mi)
- Time zone: UTC+01:00 (CET)
  - Summer (DST): UTC+02:00 (CEST)
- INSEE/Postal code: 04177 /04380
- ^{1} French Land Register data, which excludes lakes, ponds, glaciers > 1 km^{2} (0.386 sq mi or 247 acres) and river estuaries.

Hautes-Duyes (French pronunciation: [ot dɥi]; Occitan: Duias Autas) is a commune in the Alpes-de-Haute-Provence department in southeastern France. It was created in 1973 by the merger of two former communes: Saint-Estève and Auribeau.

== Population ==
Population data refer to the area corresponding with the commune as of January 2025.

Historical population
| Year | Pop. | ±% p.a. |
|---|---|---|
| 1968 | 48 | — |
| 1975 | 38 | −3.28% |
| 1982 | 33 | −2.00% |
| 1990 | 29 | −1.60% |
| 1999 | 27 | −0.79% |
| 2007 | 33 | +2.54% |
| 2012 | 40 | +3.92% |
| 2017 | 43 | +1.46% |
| 2023 | 53 | +3.55% |
Source: INSEE

== See also ==
- Communes of the Alpes-de-Haute-Provence department
