= La Robine-sur-Galabre =

- Commune
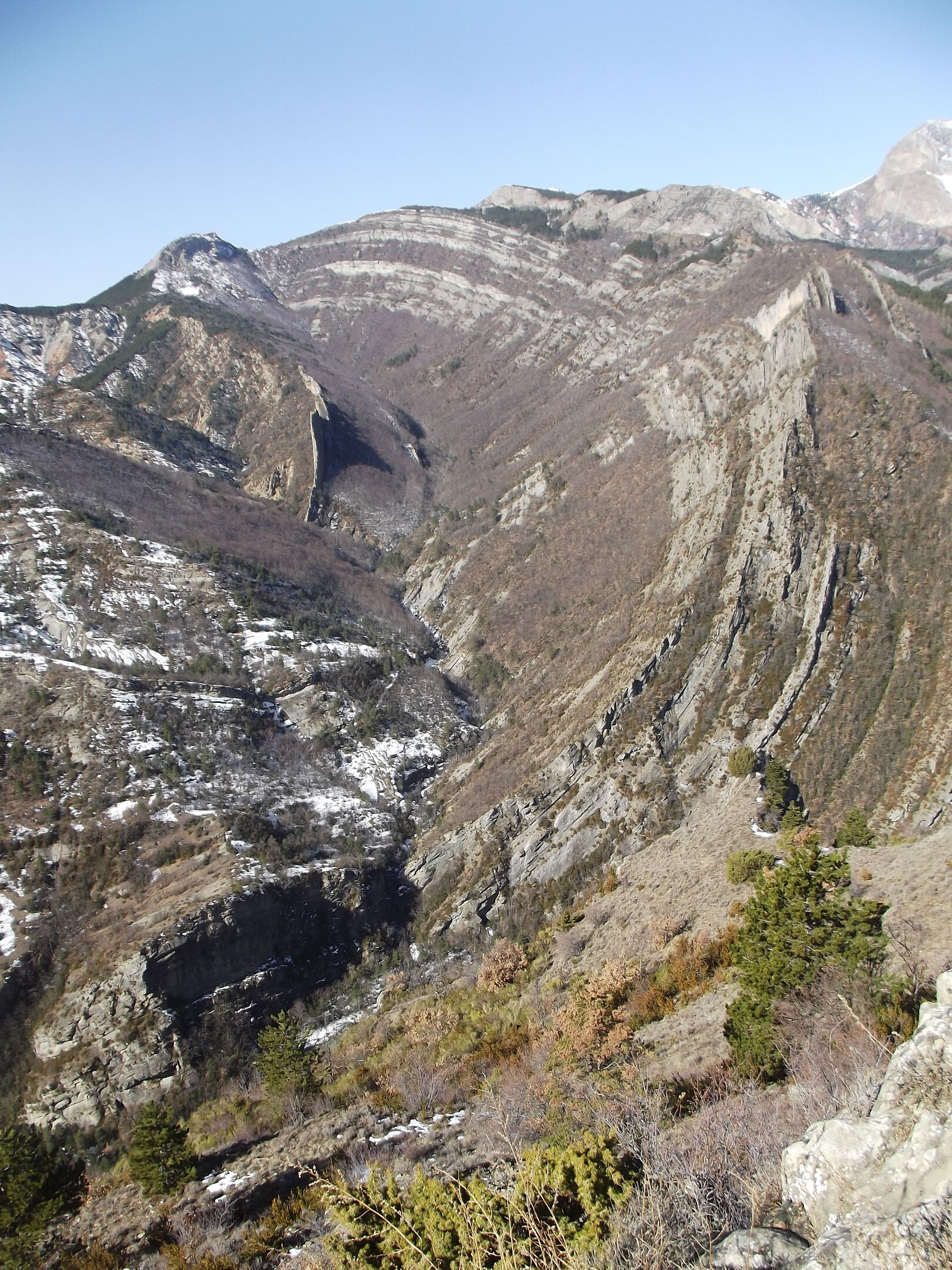
- The Velodrome of La Robine

- Coat of arms
- Location of La Robine-sur-Galabre
- Location within France Location within Provence-Alpes-Côte d'Azur
- Coordinates: 44°10′12″N 6°13′07″E
- Country: France
- Region: Provence-Alpes-Côte d'Azur
- Department: Alpes-de-Haute-Provence
- Arrondissement: Digne-les-Bains
- Canton: Digne-les-Bains-1
- Intercommunality: Provence-Alpes Agglomération

Government
  - Mayor (2026–32): Bruno Acciaï
- Area^{1}: 45.91 km^{2} (17.73 sq mi)
- Highest elevation: 1,887 m (6,191 ft)
- Lowest elevation: 646 m (2,119 ft)
- Population (2023): 301
  - Density: 6.56/km^{2} (17.0/sq mi)
- Time zone: UTC+01:00 (CET)
  - Summer (DST): UTC+02:00 (CEST)
- INSEE/Postal code: 04167 /04000
- ^{1} French Land Register data, which excludes lakes, ponds, glaciers > 1 km^{2} (0.386 sq mi or 247 acres) and river estuaries.

La Robine-sur-Galabre (Occitan: La Robina sus Galabre) is a commune in the Alpes-de-Haute-Provence department in southeastern France.

== Population ==
Historical population
Year	Pop.	±% p.a.
1968	81	—
1975	74	−1.28%
1982	146	+10.19%
1990	228	+5.73%
1999	257	+1.34%
2007	317	+2.66%
2012	314	−0.19%
2017	299	−0.97%
2023	301	+0.11%
Source: INSEE

== See also ==
- Communes of the Alpes-de-Haute-Provence department
