= Bléone =

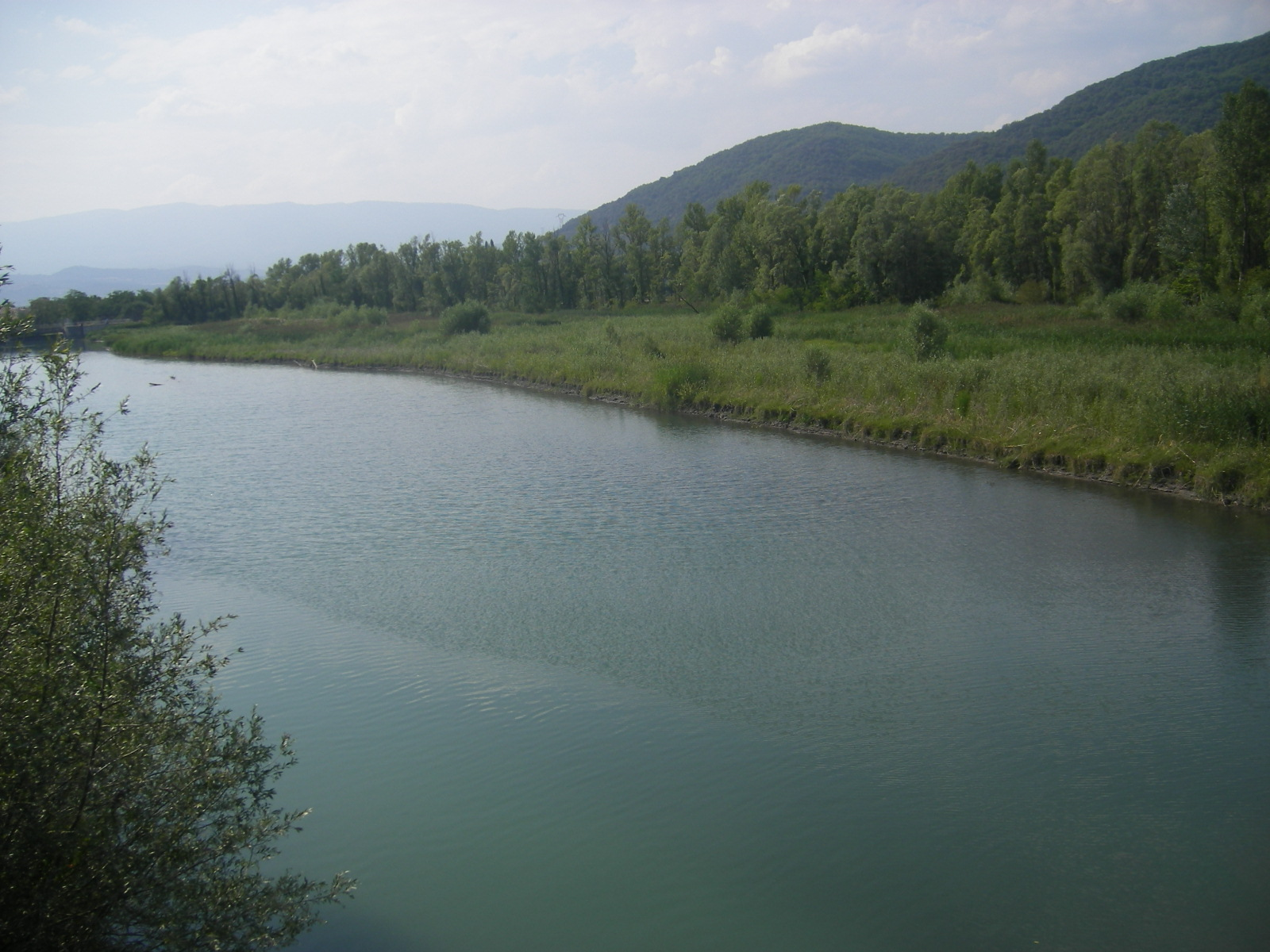
- The Bléone at Malijai

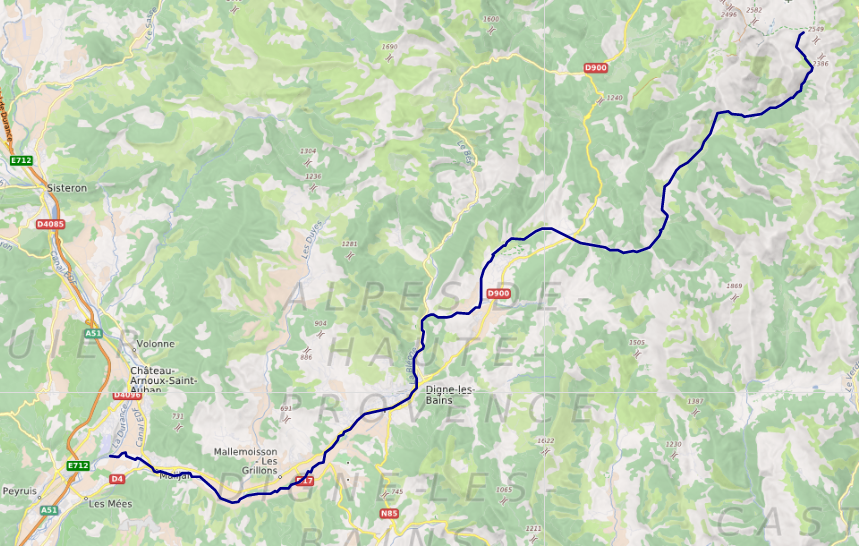

Location
- Country: France

Physical characteristics
- Source
  - location: Prads-Haute-Bléone
  - coordinates: 44.2834°N 6.5322°E
  - elevation: 1,980 m (6,500 ft)
- Mouth
  - location: Durance
  - coordinates: 44°03′09″N 05°59′48″E
  - elevation: 400 m (1,300 ft)
- Length: 69.5 km (43.2 mi)
- Basin size: 906 km^{2} (350 sq mi)

Basin features
- Progression: Durance→ Rhône→ Mediterranean Sea

The Bléone (French pronunciation: [bleɔn]; Occitan: Blèuna) is a 69.5-kilometre (43.2 mi) long river in the Alpes-de-Haute-Provence département, southeastern France. Its drainage basin is 906 km^{2} (350 sq mi). Its source is several small streams converging near the refuge de l'Estrop, a mountain shelter in Prads-Haute-Bléone. It flows generally southwest. It is a left tributary of the Durance into which it flows between L'Escale and Les Mées.

== Communes along its course ==
This list is ordered from source to mouth: Prads-Haute-Bléone, La Javie, Le Brusquet, Marcoux, Digne-les-Bains, Aiglun, Mallemoisson, Le Chaffaut-Saint-Jurson, Mirabeau, Malijai, L'Escale, Les Mées,
