= Entrages =

- Commune
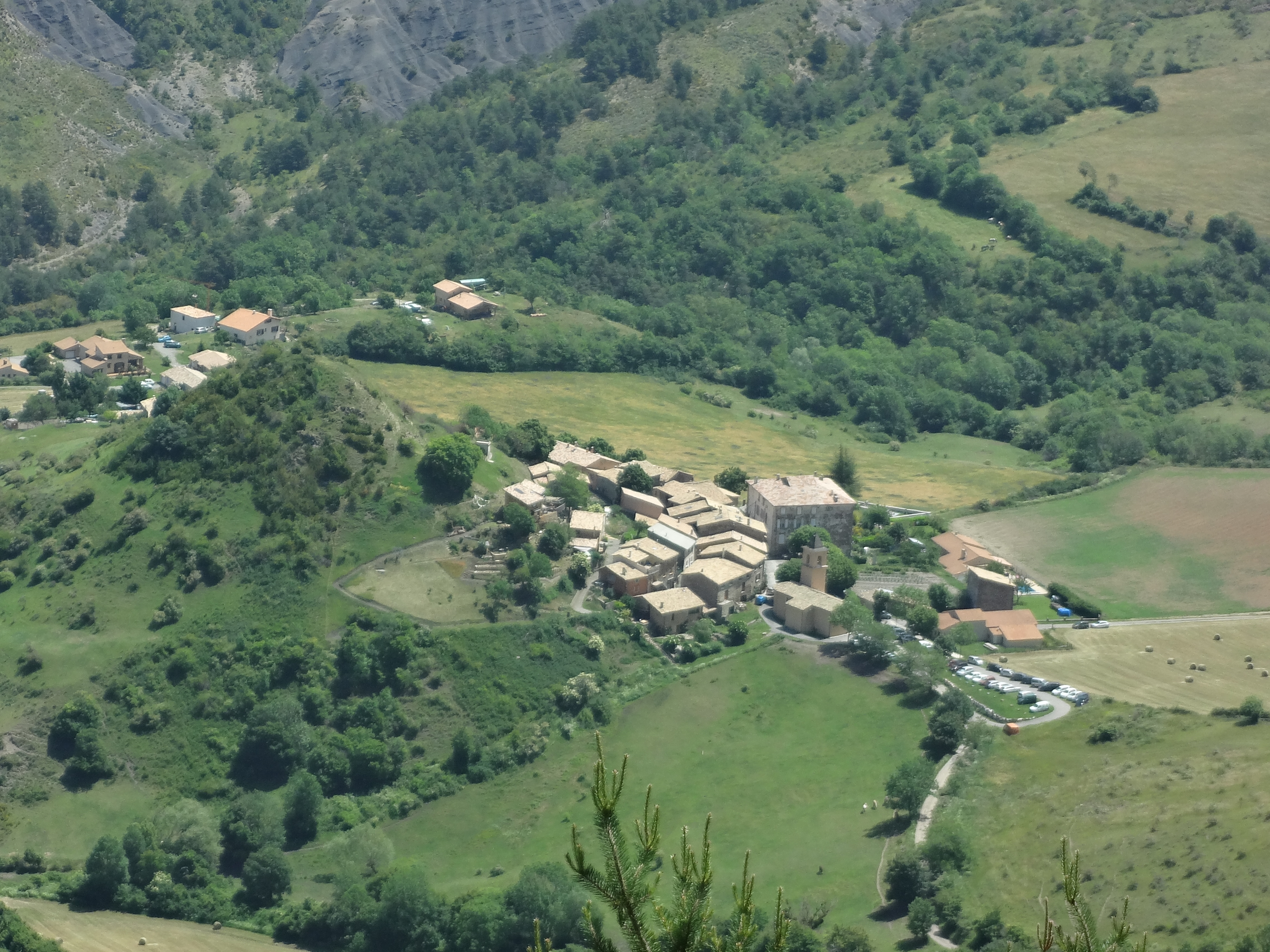
- The village of Entrages, seen from the Cousson

- Coat of arms
- Location of Entrages
- Location within France Location within Provence-Alpes-Côte d'Azur
- Coordinates: 44°02′49″N 6°16′01″E
- Country: France
- Region: Provence-Alpes-Côte d'Azur
- Department: Alpes-de-Haute-Provence
- Arrondissement: Digne-les-Bains
- Canton: Digne-les-Bains-1
- Intercommunality: Provence-Alpes Agglomération

Government
  - Mayor (2026–32): Marie-José Magaud
- Area^{1}: 22.61 km^{2} (8.73 sq mi)
- Elevation: 923 m (3,028 ft)
- Highest elevation: 1,515 m (4,970 ft)
- Lowest elevation: 593 m (1,946 ft)
- Population (2023): 100
  - Density: 4.4/km^{2} (11/sq mi)
- Time zone: UTC+01:00 (CET)
  - Summer (DST): UTC+02:00 (CEST)
- INSEE/Postal code: 04074 /04000
- ^{1} French Land Register data, which excludes lakes, ponds, glaciers > 1 km^{2} (0.386 sq mi or 247 acres) and river estuaries.

Entrages (French pronunciation: [ɑ̃tʁaʒ]; Occitan: Entratges) is a commune in the Alpes-de-Haute-Provence department in southeastern France.

== Geography ==
The river Asse forms most of the commune's southern border.

== Population ==
Historical population
Year	Pop.	±% p.a.
1968	75	—
1975	68	−1.39%
1982	65	−0.64%
1990	92	+4.44%
1999	85	−0.88%
2007	115	+3.85%
2012	114	−0.17%
2017	104	−1.82%
2023	100	−0.65%
Source: INSEE

== See also ==
- Communes of the Alpes-de-Haute-Provence department
