= Marcoux, Alpes-de-Haute-Provence =

Marcoux
- Commune
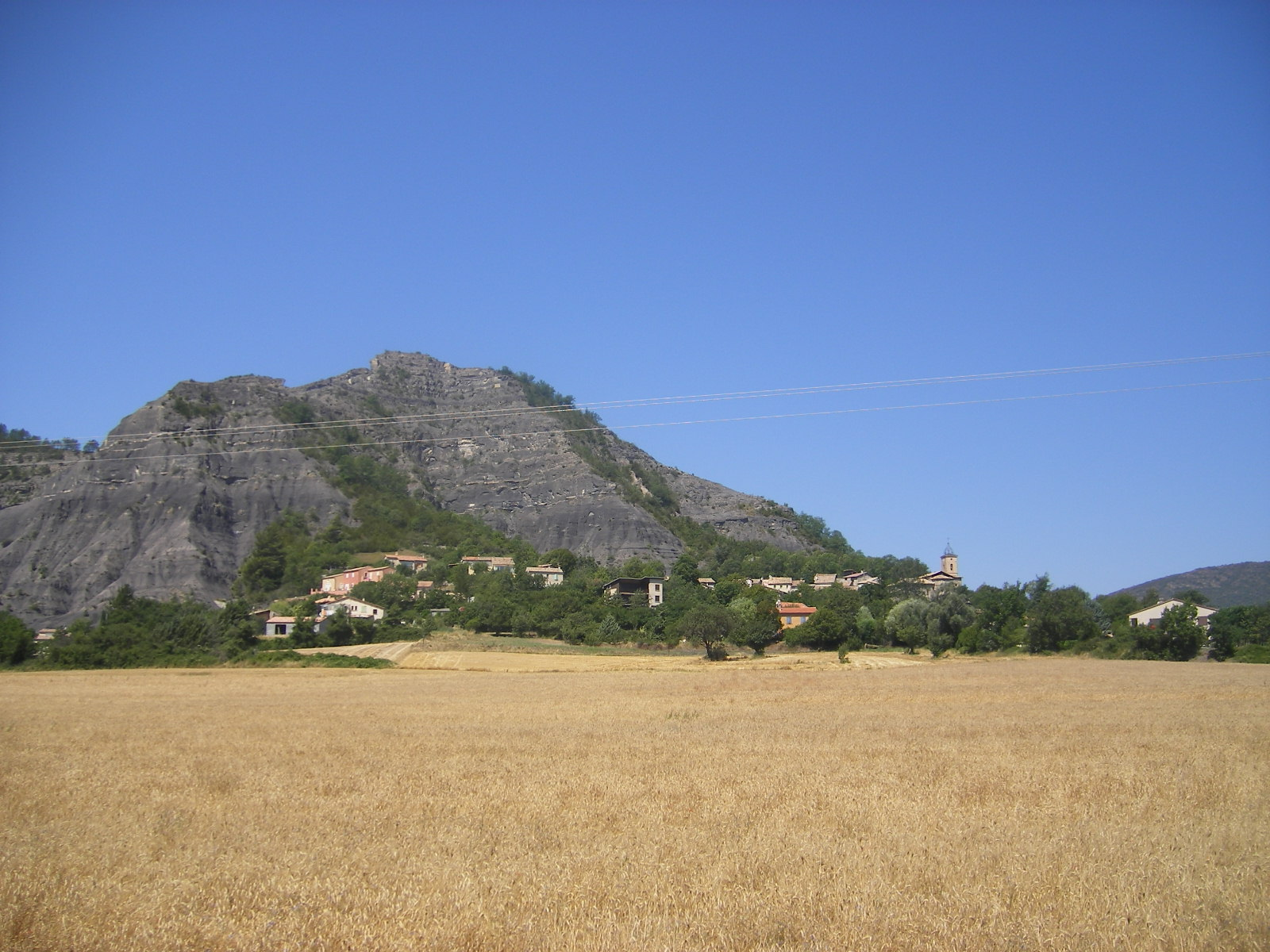
- Marcoux as seen from the D900 road

- Coat of arms
- Location of Marcoux
- Location within France Location within Provence-Alpes-Côte d'Azur
- Coordinates: 44°07′N 6°16′E
- Country: France
- Region: Provence-Alpes-Côte d'Azur
- Department: Alpes-de-Haute-Provence
- Arrondissement: Digne-les-Bains
- Canton: Digne-les-Bains-1
- Intercommunality: CA Provence-Alpes

Government
  - Mayor (2026–32): Christian Boyer
- Area^{1}: 32.17 km^{2} (12.42 sq mi)
- Elevation: 691 m (2,267 ft)
- Highest elevation: 1,311 m (4,301 ft)
- Lowest elevation: 604 m (1,982 ft)
- Population (2023): 466
  - Density: 14.5/km^{2} (37.5/sq mi)
- Time zone: UTC+01:00 (CET)
  - Summer (DST): UTC+02:00 (CEST)
- INSEE/Postal code: 04113 /04420
- ^{1} French Land Register data, which excludes lakes, ponds, glaciers > 1 km^{2} (0.386 sq mi or 247 acres) and river estuaries.

Marcoux (French pronunciation: [maʁku]; Occitan: Marcòs) is a village and commune in the Alpes-de-Haute-Provence department of southeastern France.

== Geography ==
The river Bléone flows southwest through the northern part of the commune and forms part of its northeastern and western borders.

== Population ==
Historical population
Year	Pop.	±% p.a.
1968	166	—
1975	305	+9.08%
1982	390	+3.57%
1990	414	+0.75%
1999	402	−0.33%
2007	478	+2.19%
2012	516	+1.54%
2017	464	−2.10%
2023	466	+0.07%
Source: INSEE

== See also ==
- Communes of the Alpes-de-Haute-Provence department
