= Le Brusquet =

- Commune
- Coat of arms
- Location of Le Brusquet
- Location within France Location within Provence-Alpes-Côte d'Azur
- Coordinates: 44°09′42″N 6°18′37″E
- Country: France
- Region: Provence-Alpes-Côte d'Azur
- Department: Alpes-de-Haute-Provence
- Arrondissement: Digne-les-Bains
- Canton: Seyne
- Intercommunality: CA Provence-Alpes

Government
  - Mayor (2026–32): Gilbert Reinaudo
- Area^{1}: 22.25 km^{2} (8.59 sq mi)
- Elevation: 775 m (2,543 ft)
- Highest elevation: 1,550 m (5,090 ft)
- Lowest elevation: 694 m (2,277 ft)
- Population (2023): 965
  - Density: 43.4/km^{2} (112/sq mi)
- Time zone: UTC+01:00 (CET)
  - Summer (DST): UTC+02:00 (CEST)
- INSEE/Postal code: 04036 /04420
- ^{1} French Land Register data, which excludes lakes, ponds, glaciers > 1 km^{2} (0.386 sq mi or 247 acres) and river estuaries.

Le Brusquet (French pronunciation: [lə bʁyskɛ]; Occitan: Lo Brusquet) is a commune in the Alpes-de-Haute-Provence department in southeastern France.

== Geography ==
The Bléone flows southwest through the middle of the commune and forms part of its southwestern border.

== Population ==
Historical population
Year	Pop.	±% p.a.
1968	264	—
1975	330	+3.24%
1982	585	+8.52%
1990	787	+3.78%
1999	966	+2.30%
2007	984	+0.23%
2012	964	−0.41%
2017	958	−0.12%
2023	965	+0.12%
Source: INSEE

== See also ==
- Communes of the Alpes-de-Haute-Provence department
