= Malijai =

- Commune
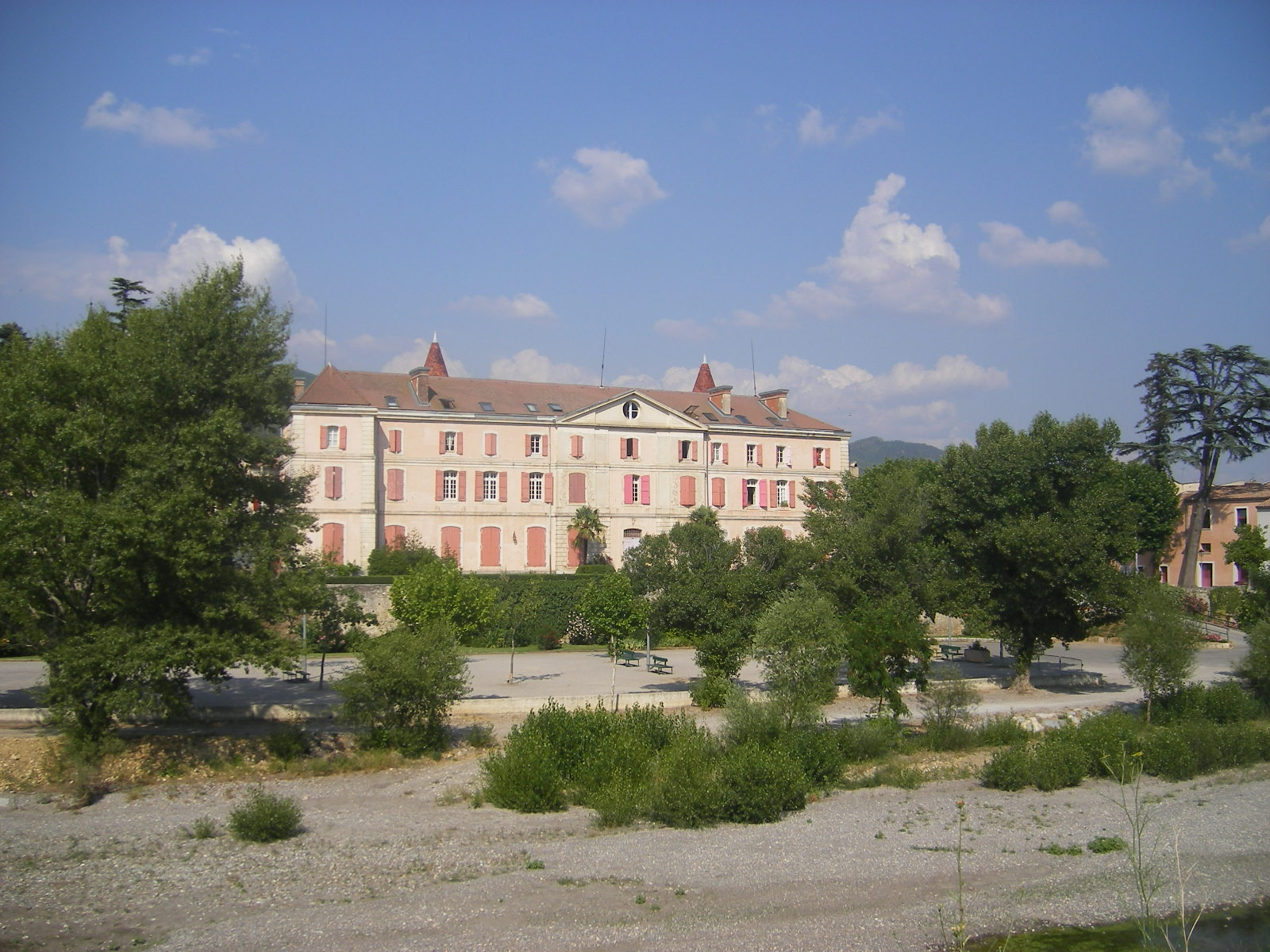
- The chateau of Malijai

- Coat of arms
- Location of Malijai
- Location within France Location within Provence-Alpes-Côte d'Azur
- Coordinates: 44°02′48″N 6°01′52″E
- Country: France
- Region: Provence-Alpes-Côte d'Azur
- Department: Alpes-de-Haute-Provence
- Arrondissement: Digne-les-Bains
- Canton: Digne-les-Bains-2
- Intercommunality: CA Provence-Alpes

Government
  - Mayor (2026–32): Sonia Fontaine
- Area^{1}: 26.56 km^{2} (10.25 sq mi)
- Elevation: 428 m (1,404 ft)
- Highest elevation: 1,080 m (3,540 ft)
- Lowest elevation: 422 m (1,385 ft)
- Population (2023): 2,020
  - Density: 76.1/km^{2} (197/sq mi)
- Time zone: UTC+01:00 (CET)
  - Summer (DST): UTC+02:00 (CEST)
- INSEE/Postal code: 04108 /04350
- ^{1} French Land Register data, which excludes lakes, ponds, glaciers > 1 km^{2} (0.386 sq mi or 247 acres) and river estuaries.

Malijai (French pronunciation: [maliʒɛ]) is a commune in the Alpes-de-Haute-Provence department in southeastern France. In 1974, it absorbed the former commune Chénerilles.

== Geography ==
The village lies on the right bank of the Bléone, which forms part of the commune's western border, then flows west through the northern part of the commune.

== Population ==
Population data refer to the commune in its geography as of January 2025.

Historical population
Year	Pop.	±% p.a.
1968	996	—
1975	1,419	+5.19%
1982	1,578	+1.53%
1990	1,703	+0.96%
1999	1,628	−0.50%
2007	1,924	+2.11%
2012	1,976	+0.53%
2017	1,975	−0.01%
2023	2,020	+0.38%
Source: INSEE

== See also ==
- Communes of the Alpes-de-Haute-Provence department
