= La Javie =

- Commune
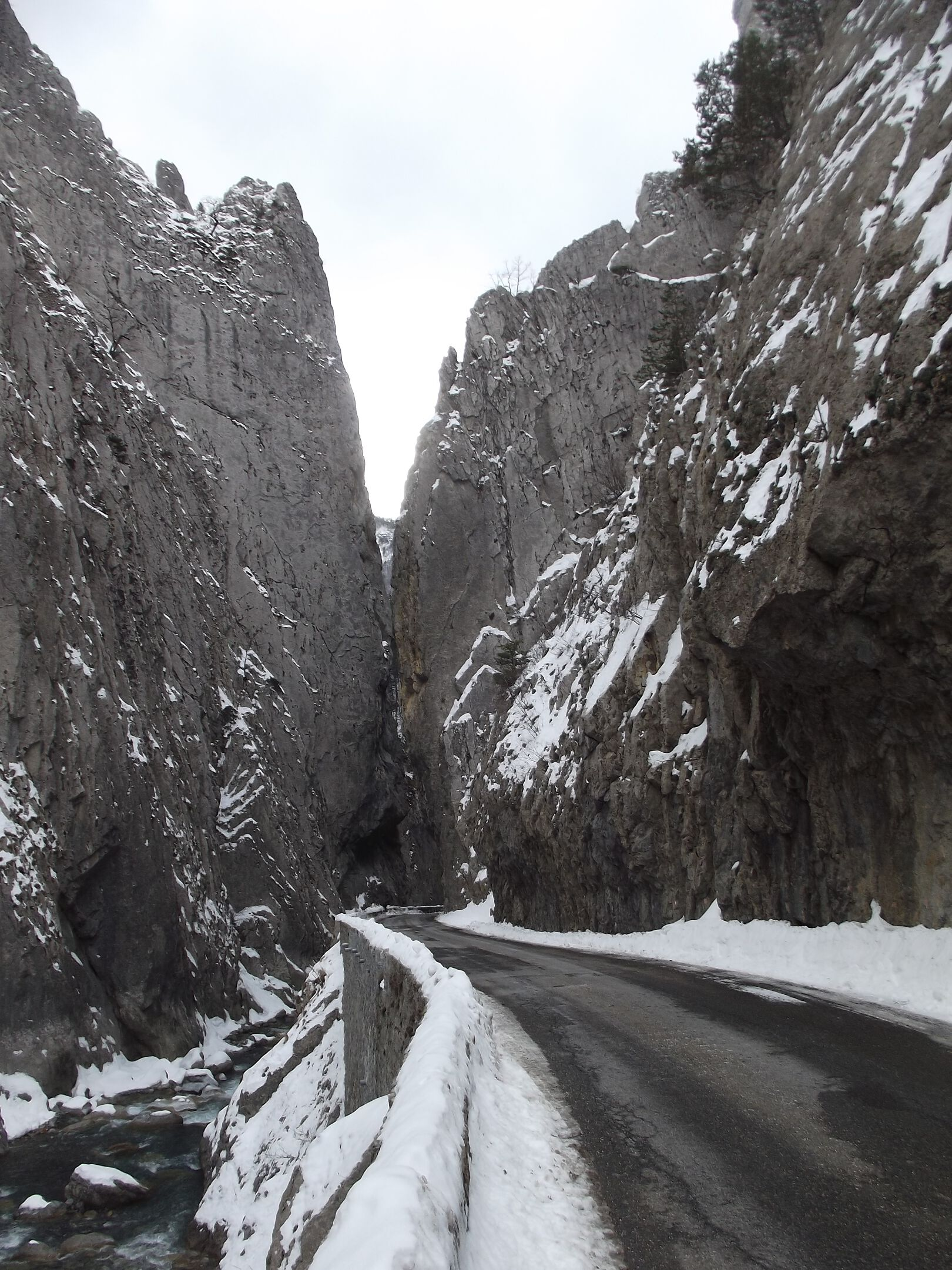
- The Barles Gorge, in winter

- Coat of arms
- Location of La Javie
- Location within France Location within Provence-Alpes-Côte d'Azur
- Coordinates: 44°10′31″N 6°21′07″E
- Country: France
- Region: Provence-Alpes-Côte d'Azur
- Department: Alpes-de-Haute-Provence
- Arrondissement: Digne-les-Bains
- Canton: Seyne
- Intercommunality: CA Provence-Alpes

Government
  - Mayor (2026–32): Alex Boghossian
- Area^{1}: 37.27 km^{2} (14.39 sq mi)
- Elevation: 800 m (2,600 ft)
- Highest elevation: 2,186 m (7,172 ft)
- Lowest elevation: 752 m (2,467 ft)
- Population (2023): 376
  - Density: 10.1/km^{2} (26.1/sq mi)
- Time zone: UTC+01:00 (CET)
  - Summer (DST): UTC+02:00 (CEST)
- INSEE/Postal code: 04097 /04420
- ^{1} French Land Register data, which excludes lakes, ponds, glaciers > 1 km^{2} (0.386 sq mi or 247 acres) and river estuaries.

La Javie (French pronunciation: [la ʒavi]; Occitan: La Jàvia) is a commune in the Alpes-de-Haute-Provence department in southeastern France.

== Geography ==
The village lies on the right bank of the Bléone, which flows west through the southeastern part of the commune.

== Population ==
Historical population
Year	Pop.	±% p.a.
1968	261	—
1975	222	−2.29%
1982	251	+1.77%
1990	297	+2.13%
1999	335	+1.35%
2007	390	+1.92%
2012	395	+0.26%
2017	404	+0.45%
2023	376	−1.19%
Source: INSEE

== See also ==
- Communes of the Alpes-de-Haute-Provence department
