= Canton of Mézel =

Coordinates: 43°59′51″N 6°11′48″E

Mézel
- Former canton
- Interactive map of Mézel
- Country: France
- Region: Provence-Alpes-Côte d'Azur
- Department: Alpes-de-Haute-Provence
- No. of communes: {{{nbcomm}}}
- Disbanded: 2015
- Area: 209.67 km^{2} (80.95 sq mi)
- Population (2012): 2,194
  - Density: 10.46/km^{2} (27.10/sq mi)

The canton of Mézel is a former administrative division in southeastern France. It was disbanded following the French canton reorganisation which came into effect in March 2015. It consisted of 8 communes, which joined the canton of Riez in 2015. It had 2,194 inhabitants (2012).

The canton comprised the following communes:

- Beynes
- Bras-d'Asse
- Châteauredon
- Estoublon
- Majastres
- Mézel
- Saint-Jeannet
- Saint-Julien-d'Asse

== Demographics ==
Historical population Canton of Mézel
| Year | 1962 | 1968 | 1975 | 1982 | 1990 | 1999 |
| Pop. | 1,036 | 1,128 | 1,094 | 1,158 | 1,433 | 1,648 |
| ±% | — | +8.9% | −3.0% | +5.9% | +23.7% | +15.0% |
From the year 1962 on: No double counting – residents of multiple communes (e.g. students and military personnel) are counted only once. Source: INSEE

== See also ==
- Cantons of the Alpes-de-Haute-Provence department
