= Barrême =

Barrême Barrema (Occitan)
- Commune
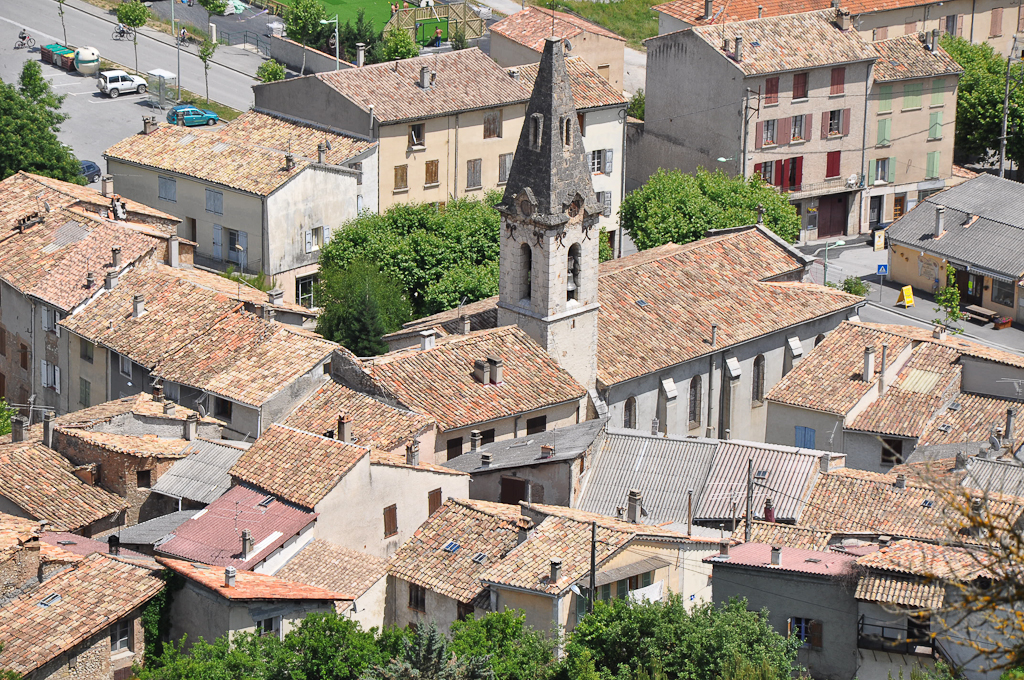
- The church and surrounding buildings in Barrême

- Coat of arms
- Location of Barrême
- Location within France Location within Provence-Alpes-Côte d'Azur
- Coordinates: 43°57′15″N 6°22′07″E
- Country: France
- Region: Provence-Alpes-Côte d'Azur
- Department: Alpes-de-Haute-Provence
- Arrondissement: Castellane
- Canton: Riez

Government
  - Mayor (2026–32): Jean-Louis Chabaud
- Area^{1}: 37.05 km^{2} (14.31 sq mi)
- Elevation: 722 m (2,369 ft)
- Highest elevation: 1,621 m (5,318 ft)
- Lowest elevation: 685 m (2,247 ft)
- Population (2023): 413
  - Density: 11.1/km^{2} (28.9/sq mi)
- Time zone: UTC+01:00 (CET)
  - Summer (DST): UTC+02:00 (CEST)
- INSEE/Postal code: 04022 /04330
- ^{1} French Land Register data, which excludes lakes, ponds, glaciers > 1 km^{2} (0.386 sq mi or 247 acres) and river estuaries.

Barrême (French pronunciation: [baʁɛm]; Occitan: Barrema) is a rural commune in the southeastern French department of Alpes-de-Haute-Provence.

== Geography ==
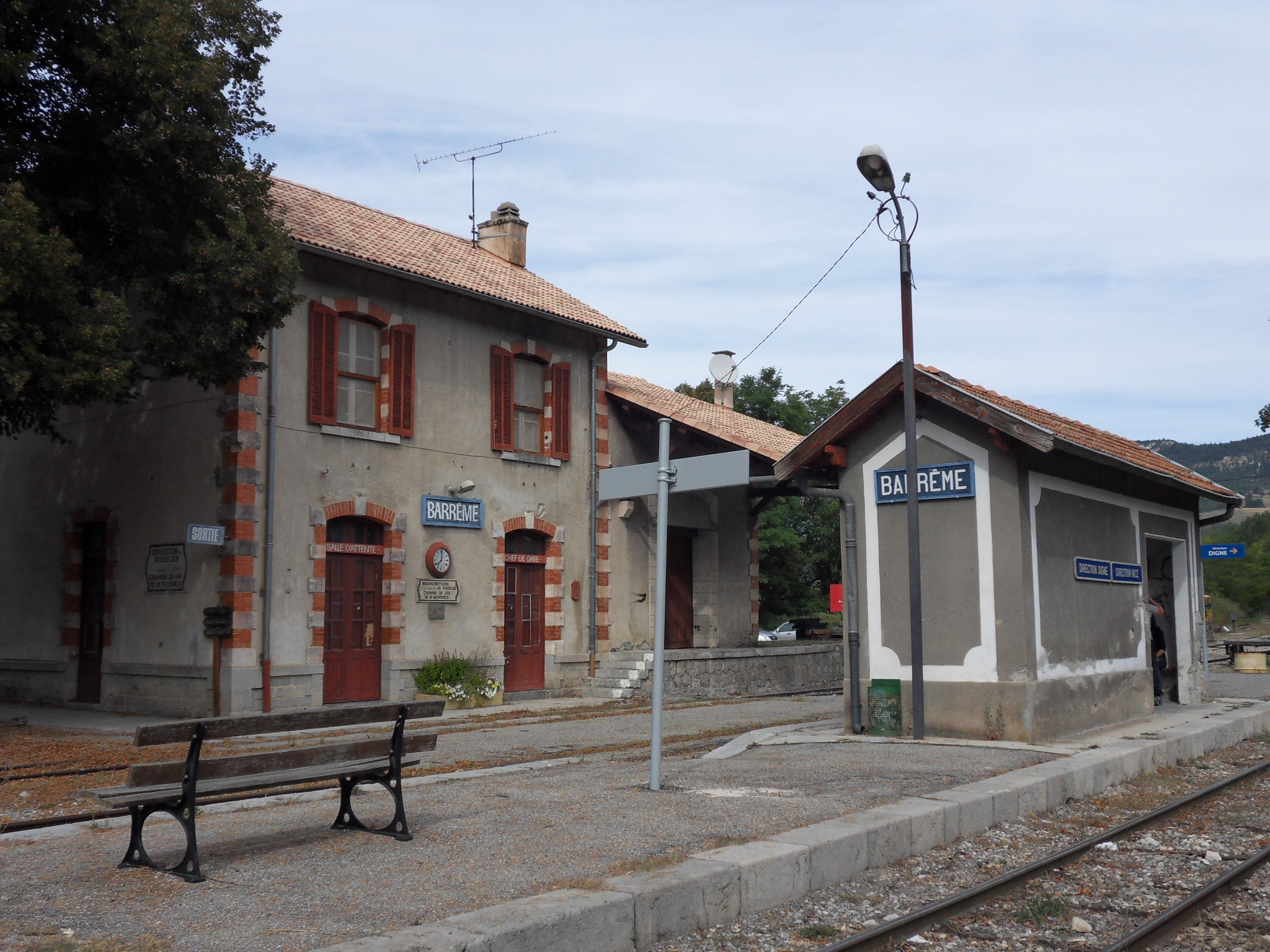
Barrême Station

Barrême is located at an altitude of 722 m some 20 km south-east of Digne-les-Bains and 15 km north-west of Castellane. Access to the commune is by Route nationale N85 which comes from Chaudon-Norante in the north-east and ends in the village. The N202 goes east from the village to Moriez. The D4085 goes south from the village to Senez. Apart from the village there are two hamlets: Gévaudan on a height near the N202, and la Basse-Palud. The Nice to Digne railway passes through the commune running parallel with the N85 and N202. It has three halts and one station: Saut du Loup, Barrême Station, La Tuiliere, and Gévaudan.

Two rivers flow through the commune and join at the village: the Asse de Moriez from the east and the Asse de Blieux from the south. These rivers merge to form the Asse which flows north-east to eventually join the Durance north-east of Manosque. The Asse de Clumanc flows from the north to join the Asse de Moriez.

=== Geology ===
The commune attracts geologists from around the world due to its rich diversity of ammonite fossils. The commune gave its name to a Stage of the Mesozoic (or secondary era) called the Barremian (4th stage of the Lower Cretaceous).

=== Relief ===
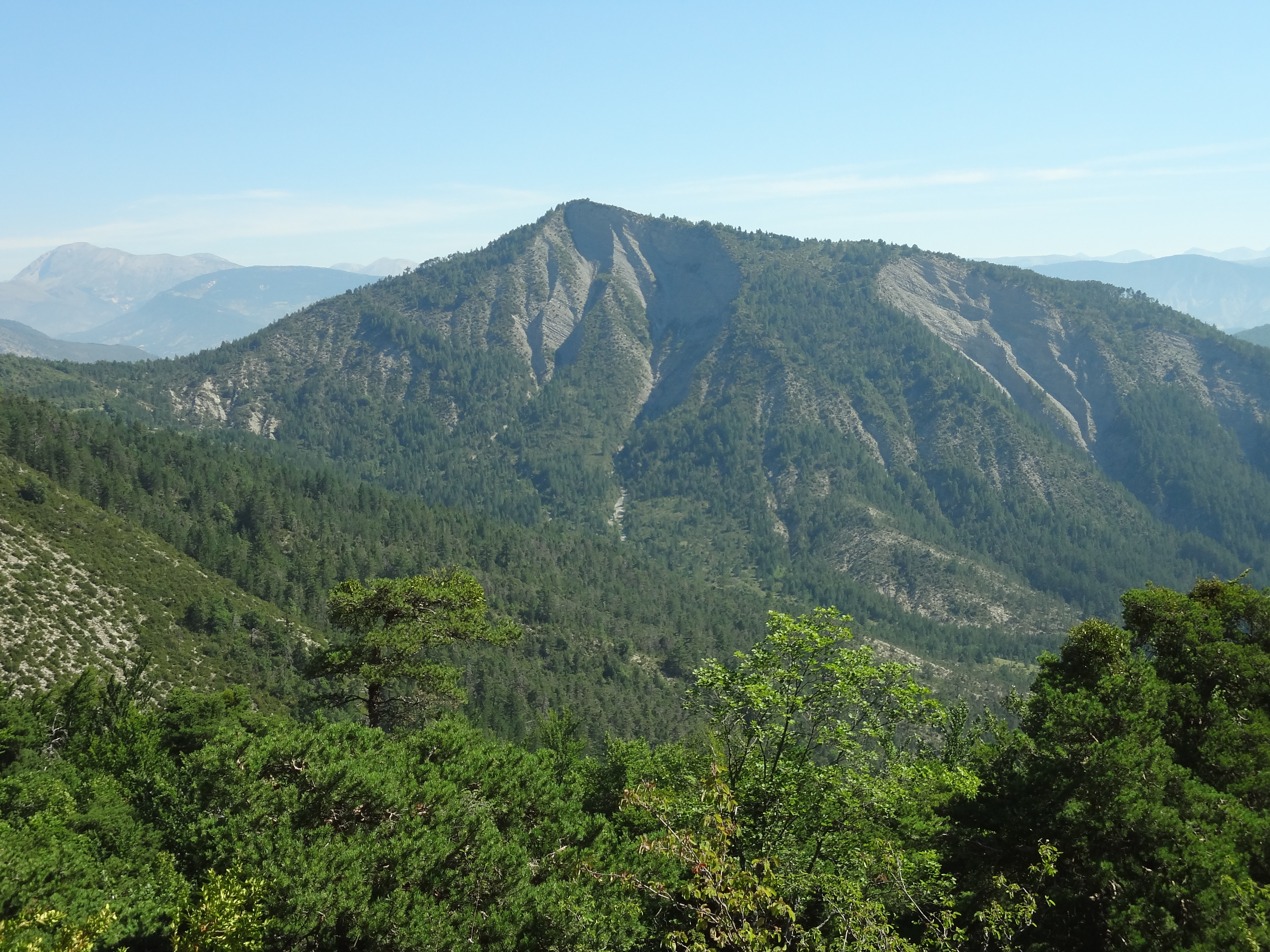
The Summit of Tourap, one of the small mountains in Barrême (1240 m)

The part of the commune located on the left bank of the Asse de Blieux is part of the Massif of Montdenier.

=== Natural and technological risks ===
None of the 200 communes in the department is in a no seismic risk zone. The commune is in area 1b (low risk) according to the deterministic classification of 1991 and based on its seismic history and in zone 4 (medium risk) according to the probabilistic classification EC8 of 2011. Barrême also faces three other natural hazards:

- Forest fire
- Flood
- Landslide

Barrême is exposed to one risk of technological origin: transport of dangerous good along the Route nationales.

There is no plan for prevention of foreseeable natural risks (PPR) for the commune but there has been a DICRIM since 2011.

The commune has been subjected to several natural disasters: in 1984 an earthquake; floods, landslides and mudslides in 1994, 1996, 2008 and 2011. Other than that of 1984 and that of 27 September 1911, whose epicentre was in the commune but was not felt, the earthquake felt the most was that of 19 March 1935 (epicentre at Saint-Clément-sur-Durance).

== Toponymy ==
The locality is cited as Sancti Jacobi de Barrema in 1215. The name is formed from the oronymic (meaning mountain) root *BAR. According to Rostaing the name is pre-Gallic.

The name of the hamlet of Gévaudan is probably derived from Gabalatanus whose origin would be a domain founded by a Gaul of the Gabali tribe.

In Vivaro-Alpine and the classical norm of the Provençal dialect the name is written Barrema or Barrèmo in the Mistralian norm.

Barrême appears as Barreme on the 1750 Cassini Map and as Barrême on the 1790 version.

== History ==
=== Middle Ages ===
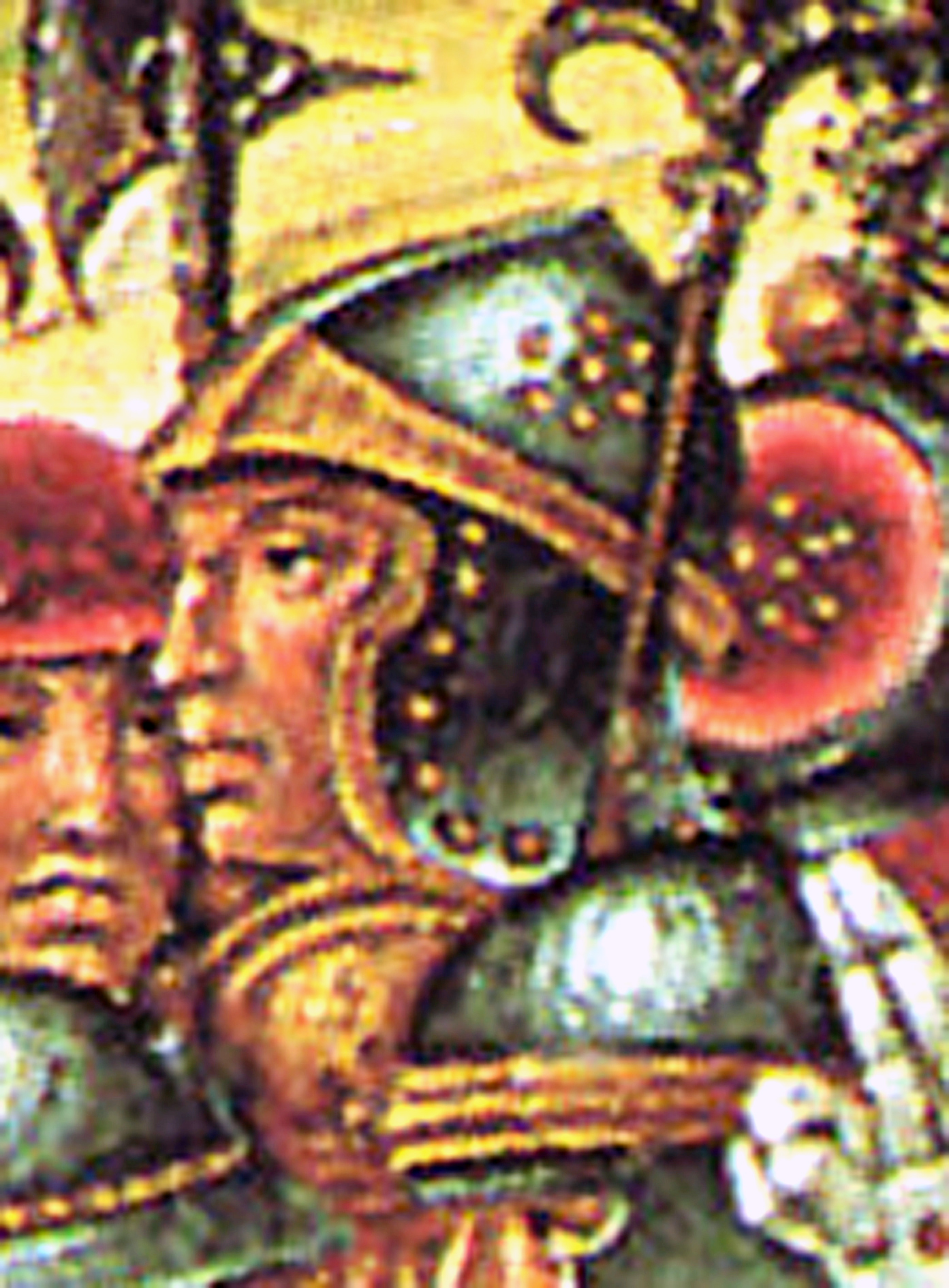
Raymond of Turenne, on a fresco in the Ospedale Santa-Maria della Scala at Siena.

Augustus conquered the Valley of Asses at the same time as the Alps, which he completed in 14 BC. At the end of the Roman Empire it is certain that the Valley of Asses was annexed by the Civitas of Sanitensium (Senez) and its diocese.

Barrême appears for the first time in charters in 1040 when it had been destroyed by fire. The village, which had been on the Col de Saint-Jean and fortified, was rebuilt on the plain.

In 1235 the Baron of Castellane ceded his rights over Barrême to the Count of Provence. The village remained the property of the Counts of Provence until 1348 when Queen Joanna I of Naples exchanged it for land in the Kingdom of Naples. It became a fief of Villeneuve until 1748. At that time seven noble families had rights of co-lordship to the commune and five of them were resident.

In 1342 the Barrême community was attached to the viguerie of Castellane by Robert, King of Naples, the Count of Provence. The death of Queen Joanna I created a crisis of succession for the County of Provence with the towns of the Union of Aix (1382-1387) supporting Charles, Duke of Durazzo, against Louis I of Anjou. Aix submitted in October 1387 which precipitated the rallying of the Carlists under the lord of Barrême, Géraud de Villeneuve. While he had supported Charles de Duras for several years, he joined with his two brothers: the Lords of Gourdon and Roquebrune from Anjou and obtained a "chapter of peace" from Marie de Châtillon on 2 January 1388 and paid homage to Louis II of Naples aged ten. The village community had also supported Charles de Duras and also submitted in 1386.

In 1390 the village was ransomed by Raymond VIII of Turenne.

Barrême was the capital of a bailiwick whose territory was detached from the Digne bailiwick at the end of the 14th century. It was the capital of a viguerie from the 15th century until the French Revolution, with dependent vigueries of Clumanc, Lambruisse, Tartonne (the lands called Baussenques named after Raymond of Baux who owned the dowry of Étiennette of Provence in the 12th century), Saint-Jacques, and Chaudon, on which depended Norante.

The village of Gévaudan was a separate fief to that of Barrême.

=== Modern times: 16th, 17th and 18th centuries ===
From the 16th century at least the community designated three consuls for their administration: two were elected by Barrêmois and the third by Saint-Lions or Gévaudan alternately every other year. The village passed to the viguerie of Castellane then Digne.

In 1536, during the invasion of Provence by Charles V, all the crops of the hinterland were destroyed including those of Barrême.

In 1559, Antoine de Mauvans pillaged the chapels and burned the communal archives. As a protection from the Catholic and Protestant gangs who passed along the roads a wall was erected in 1589-1590 but these walls were hastily built and very flimsy. By 1688 they had disappeared and were completely forgotten by the Barrêmois.

In 1629 a Plague epidemic reached Barrême despite the cordon sanitaire established upstream and was devastating. Very depleted, the commune was classified as a "helpless commune" in 1639 and authorized to sell its land to pay debts of 49000 livres. A local Fair in Barrême continued until the French Revolution.

In 1703 the Bishop of Senez, Jean Soanen destroyed the menhir. The plague of 1720 did not reach Barrême, perhaps because of the cordon sanitaire established on the Verdon.

=== French Revolution and Empire ===
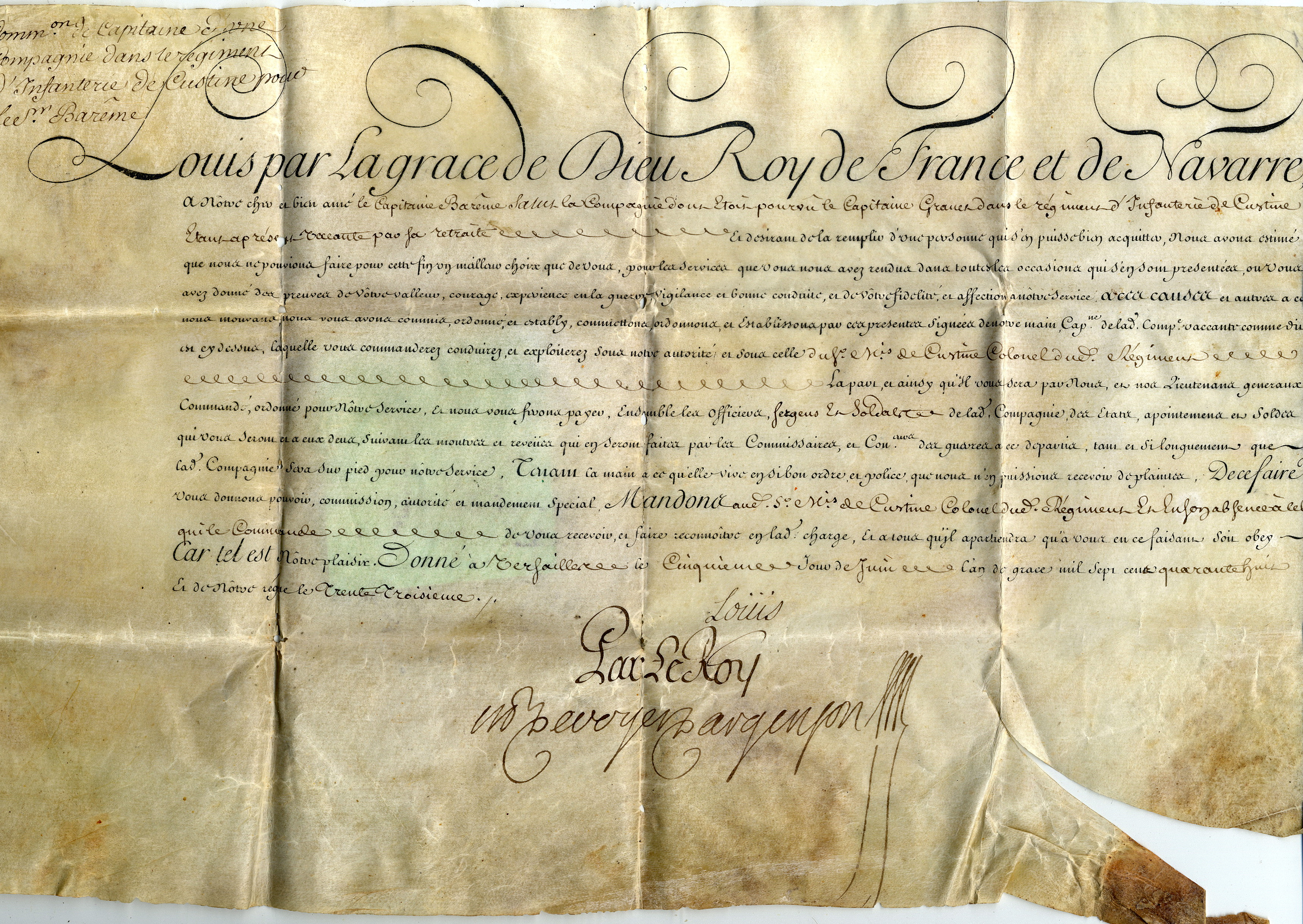
The royal brevet of Louis XVI in favour of the Viscount of Barrême

A List of Grievances of the Barrême community was drafted on 29 March, at the Notre-Dame-du-Pont Chapel as the town hall was too small to accommodate the entire population. On the same day community members were elected to bring it to Digne.

The news of the storming of the Bastille was welcomed as this event announced the end of royal arbitrariness and, perhaps, more profound changes in the organization of France. Immediately after the arrival of the news a large collective fear seized France. Rumours of troops of several thousand armed men formed by the aristocrats and destroying everything in their path propagated at high speed and caused panic. On hearing the alarm people armed themselves and sent messages to the neighbouring villages which spread fear. This created unity and the militias formed at that time were the basis of the battalions of the National Guard. The Great Fear, coming from Digne and part of the "fear Mâconnais" reached Barrême and its region on 31 July 1789 before dying out in the end.

The fruit of the Revolution were still welcome: it allowed, for example, the commune to buy the assets of the lord, the Marquis Pierre Louis of Aiminy, in 1792 and 1794. The priest of Barrême and his vicar were sworn in under the Civil Constitution of the Clergy. In January 1791, the hamlet of Saint-Lyons asked for its detachment as a commune and obtained it in March 1791.

The communal Patriotic Society was among the first 21 created in the Lower Alps before June 1792.

With the declaration of war on Austria in April 1792, the National Guard was organized in July, and two bells and the steeple cross were brought down to be sent for casting. Similarly, Saint-Blaise chapel was used to store fodder for the Army of the Alps and, in September, sixteen Barrêmois volunteers joined the army. On the proclamation of the Republic on 21 September, two oak trees were planted as a tree of liberty for one and a tree of brotherhood for the second.

On 25 November 1794 the Representant en mission, Antoine-François Gauthier des Orcières purified the Popular Society (the club).

During the Hundred Days the Emperor Napoleon I passed the night of 3 to 4 March in Barrême, followed on the 5th by the royal troops in pursuit.

=== 19th century ===
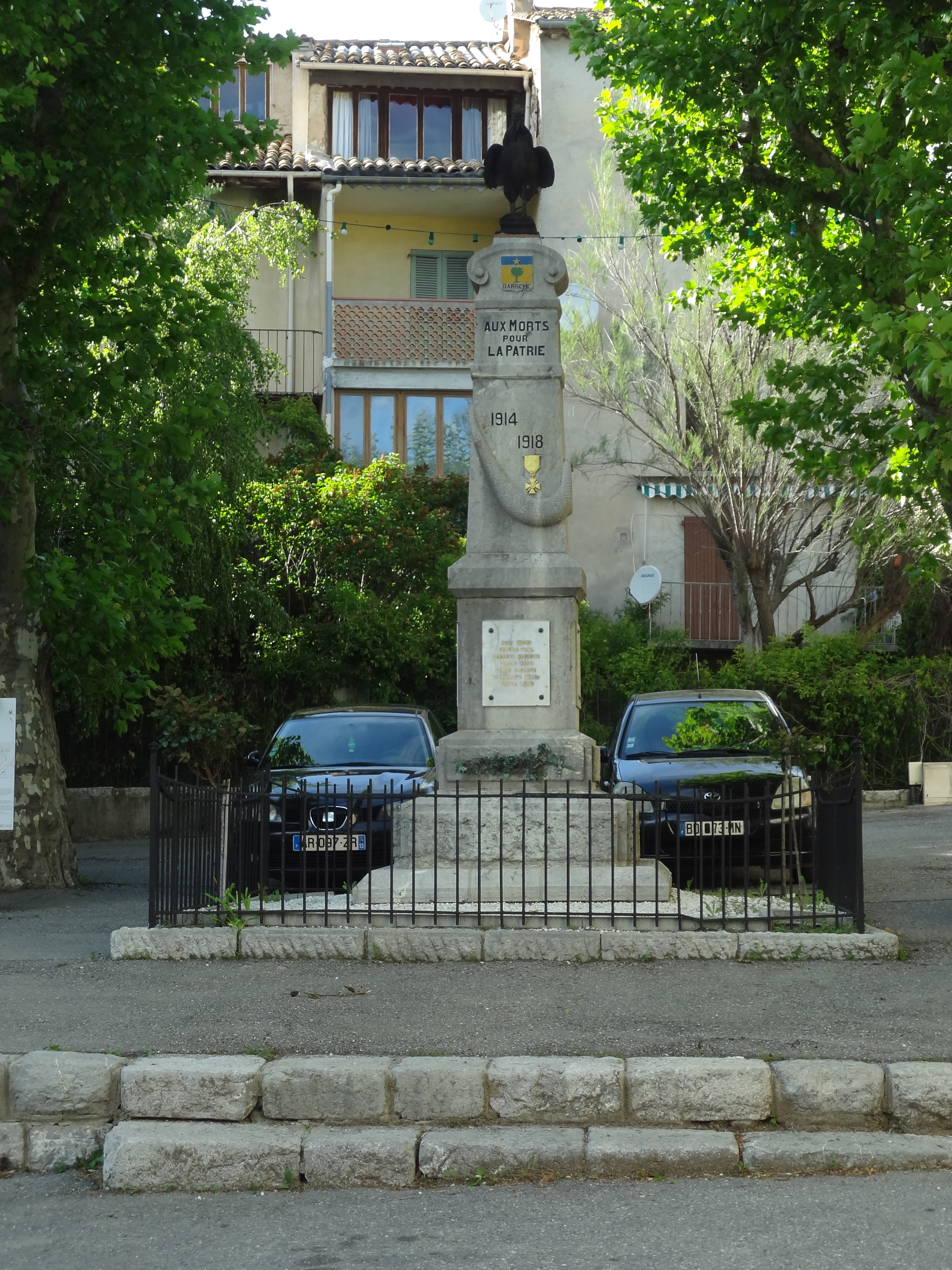
The War Memorial

An epidemic of cholera caused a few deaths in 1834 then 25 deaths in the summer of 1835. The village was ravaged by a flood of the Asse in 1860.

The commune had some industrial development through the weaving of wool. A factory was opened in 1843 by Ravel, on the model of the Honnorat factory in Saint-André-de-Méouilles. This activity had ceased by the end of the 19th century.

The coup d'état of 2 December 1851 by Louis-Napoleon Bonaparte against the Second Republic provoked an armed uprising in the Basses-Alpes in defence of the Constitution. After the failure of the uprising, harsh repression continued for those who stood up to defend the Republic: 11 inhabitants of Barrême were brought before the Joint Committee with the majority being sentenced to deportation to Algeria.

As with many communes in the department, Barrême adopted schools well before the Jules Ferry laws: in 1863 it had two, installed one in the main village and one in Gévaudan, both of which provided primary education for boys. No instruction was given for girls. The Falloux Laws (1851)require the opening of a school for girls if a commune had more than 800 inhabitants but this was not applied. With the first Duruy Law (1867), which lowered the threshold to 500 people Barrême decided to teach girls. The town benefited from the second Duruy Act (1877) to refurbish the village school.

The railway was the first section of line in Provence with the section from Digne to Saint-André-les-Alpes opened on 15 May 1892. The tunnel through the Colle was completed in 1903 and the entire line between Saint-André and Nice was inaugurated August from 5 to 7 1911 in the presence of Victor Augagneur, Minister of Public Works.

=== 20th century ===
During the Second World War two Jewish families from Lorraine took refuge in Barrême. They were deported on 30 March 1944 being thirteen people in total.

On 4 March 1944 two officers of the Gestapo were arrested by members of the Secret Army (AS).

Vines were cultivated in the commune until the middle of the 20th century for home consumption only. This culture has since been abandoned.

=== Heraldry ===
Arms of Barrême	Blazon: Gules, fretty of six lances Or inter-semy of small Inescutcheons the same, over all an inescutcheon Azure charged with a fleur-de-lis.

== Administration ==
List of Successive Mayors

From	To	Name	Party
1789	1790	Claude-André Martin	former mayor of the Ancien Régime
1790	1791	Jean Mariaud	First elected mayor after the Revolution
1792		J.-B. Béraud	
1945		Antoine Garron	
1983		Michel Blache	
2001	2008	Jean-Marie-Gibelin	PR
2008	2026	Jean-Louis Chabaud	

=== Education ===
The commune has a primary school.

There is also a municipal library.

=== Facilities ===
A Gendarmerie is located in the commune. It reports to the station at Mézel.

== Demographics ==
Its inhabitants are known in French as Barrêmois (masculine) and Barrêmoises (feminine).

Historical population

Year	Pop.	±% p.a.
1793	897	—
1821	1,012	+0.43%
1846	1,137	+0.47%
1872	1,000	−0.49%
1901	820	−0.68%
1926	682	−0.73%
1946	547	−1.10%
1962	514	−0.39%
1968	510	−0.13%

Year	Pop.	±% p.a.
1975	435	−2.25%
1982	421	−0.47%
1990	473	+1.47%
1999	433	−0.98%
2007	495	+1.69%
2012	457	−1.58%
2017	432	−1.12%
2023	413	−0.75%

Source: EHESS and INSEE

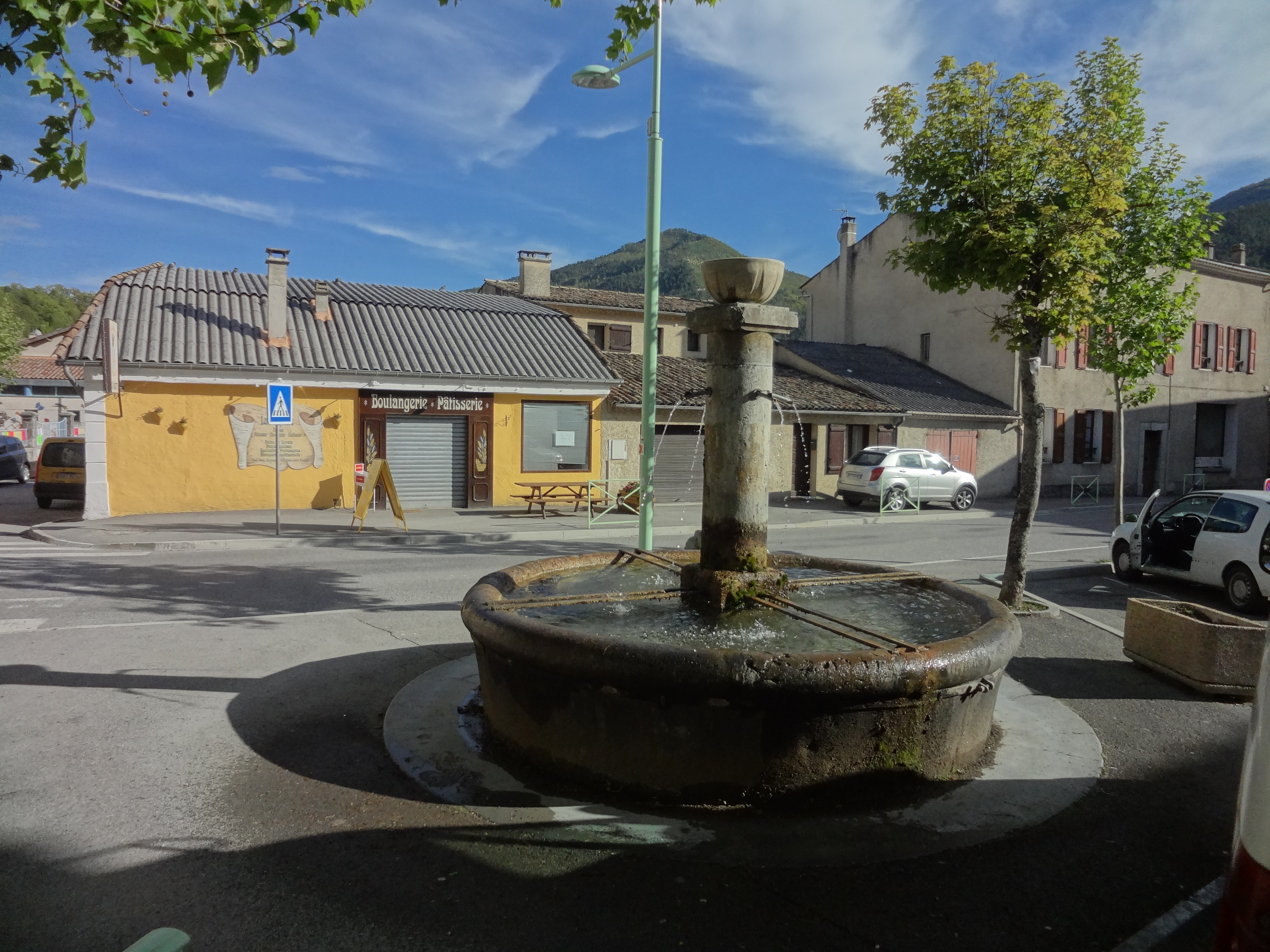
Fountain in the Church Square

The demographic history of Barrême, after the decimation in the 14th and 15th centuries and the long period of slow growth until the beginning of the 19th century, is then marked by a period of "slack" when the population remained relatively stable at a high level. This period lasted most of the 19th century. The rural exodus then caused a long-term population decline. After the Second World War the town had lost more than half of its population compared to the historical peak of 1846 which was the latest high point in the department. The downward trend continued until the late 1990s.

== Economy ==
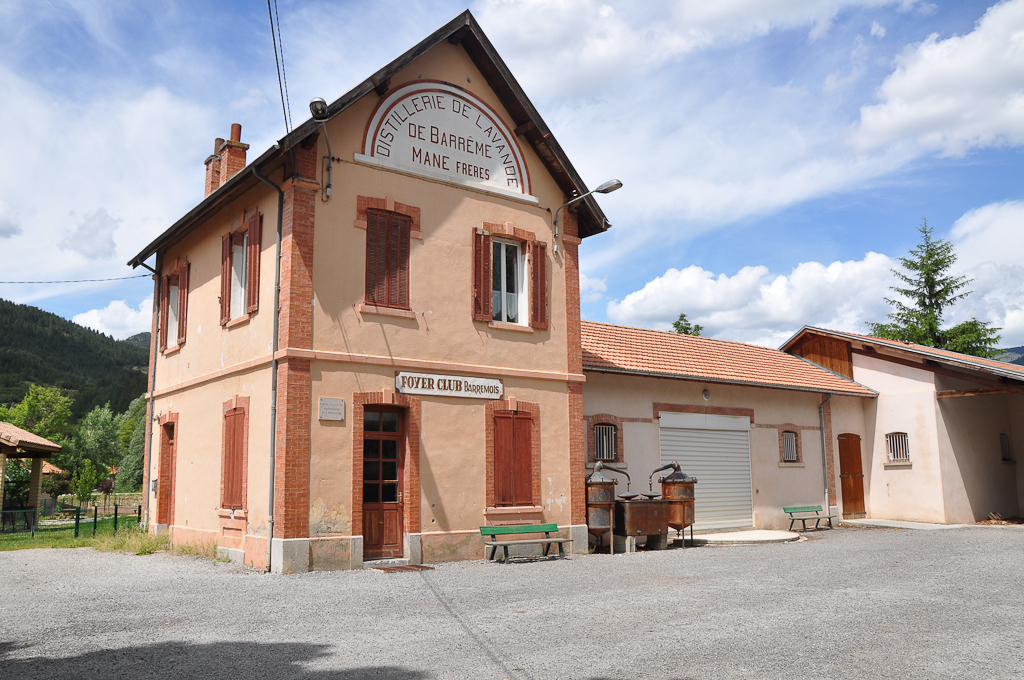
The old Lavender distillery

=== General overview ===
In 2017 the workforce totaled 186 people including 30 unemployed. These workers are mostly employees (72%) and mainly work outside the commune (60%). Most of the communal jobs are in services and trade.

=== Agriculture ===
At the end of 2015 the primary sector (agriculture, forestry) had 4 active establishments within the meaning of INSEE and provided one job.

According to the Agreste survey by the Ministry of Agriculture the number of farms has been in continuous decline for a quarter century: it declined from 14 in 1988 to 11 in 2000 and 7 in 2010. These farms are Sheep and polyculture farms. From 1988 to 2000 the utilised agricultural area (UAA) increased from 1035 hectares to 1245 hectares before falling to less than 600 ha in 2010.

=== Industry ===
At the end of 2015 the secondary sector (industry and construction) had 11 establishments employing 7 employees. The commune has a sawmill.

=== Service activities ===
At the end of 2010 the tertiary sector (trade, services) had 38 establishments (with 16 employees) plus 10 administrative establishments in: health, social and education (24 employees).

According to the Departmental Observatory of Tourism, the tourism function is important for the town, with between one and five tourists accommodated per capita. Most of the accommodation capacity is non-market. There are several accommodation facilities for tourists in the commune:

- one unclassified hotel with 12 beds
- one 3 star camping ground with 400 sites
- 1 3-star and 1 2-star Gites de France furnished accommodations with 10 beds
- 1 Guesthouse accommodation with 10 beds
- 2 hostels with 32 beds

Second homes provide an important adjunct to capacity with 119 with a capacity of 594 beds.

== Culture and heritage ==
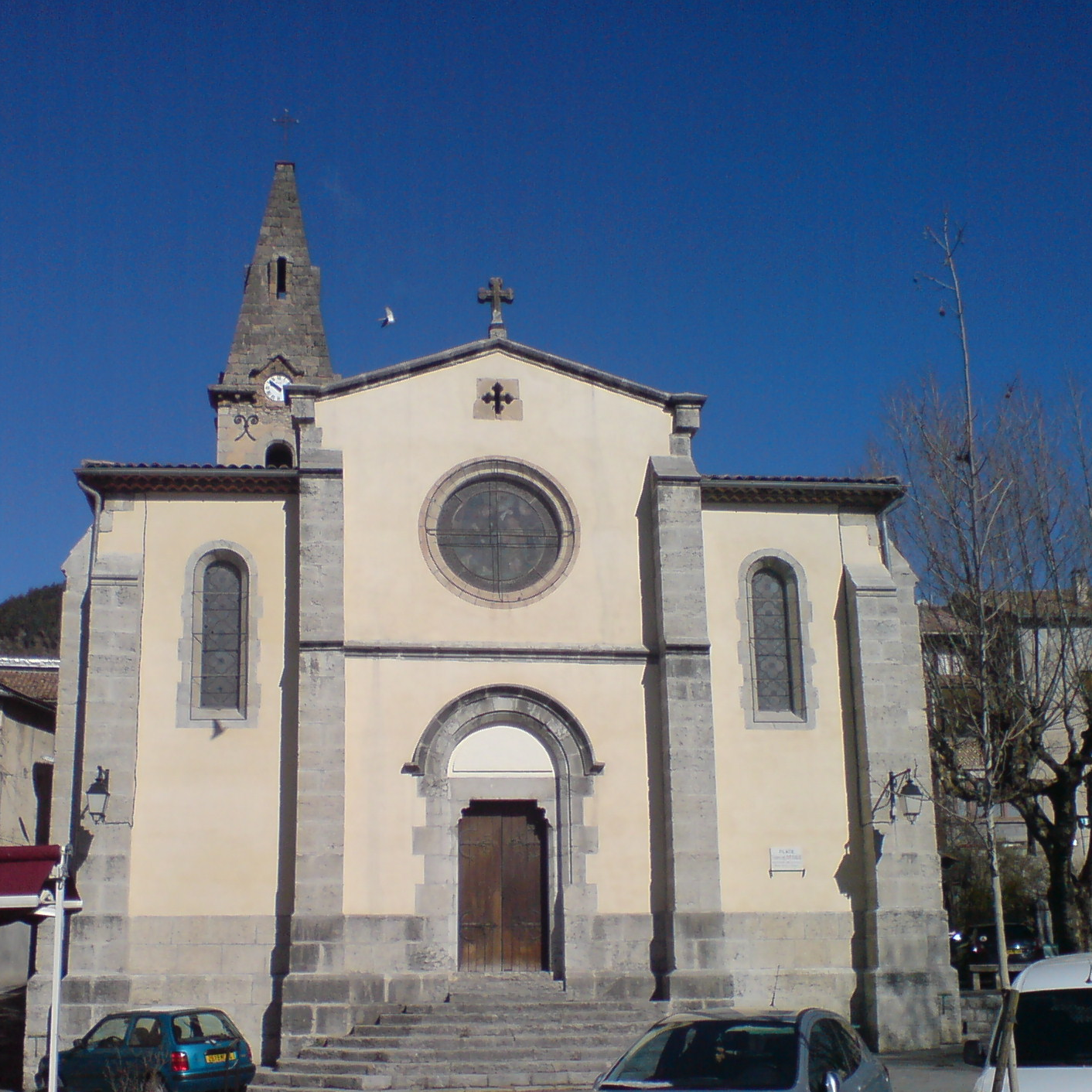
Church of Saint John the Baptist

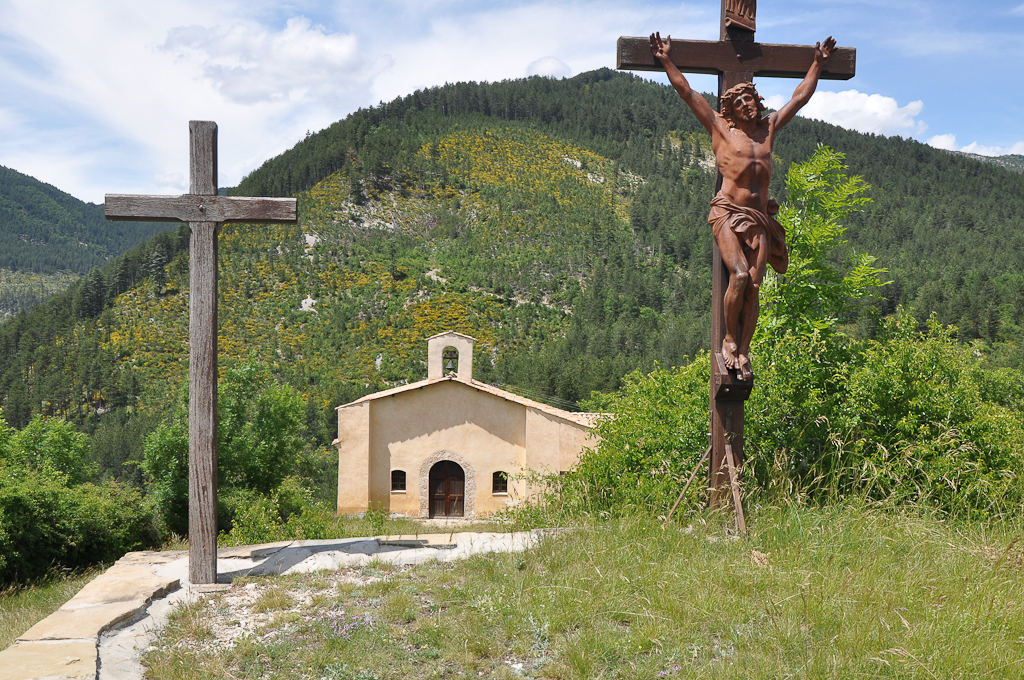
Notre-Dame du Pont Chapel and Calvary

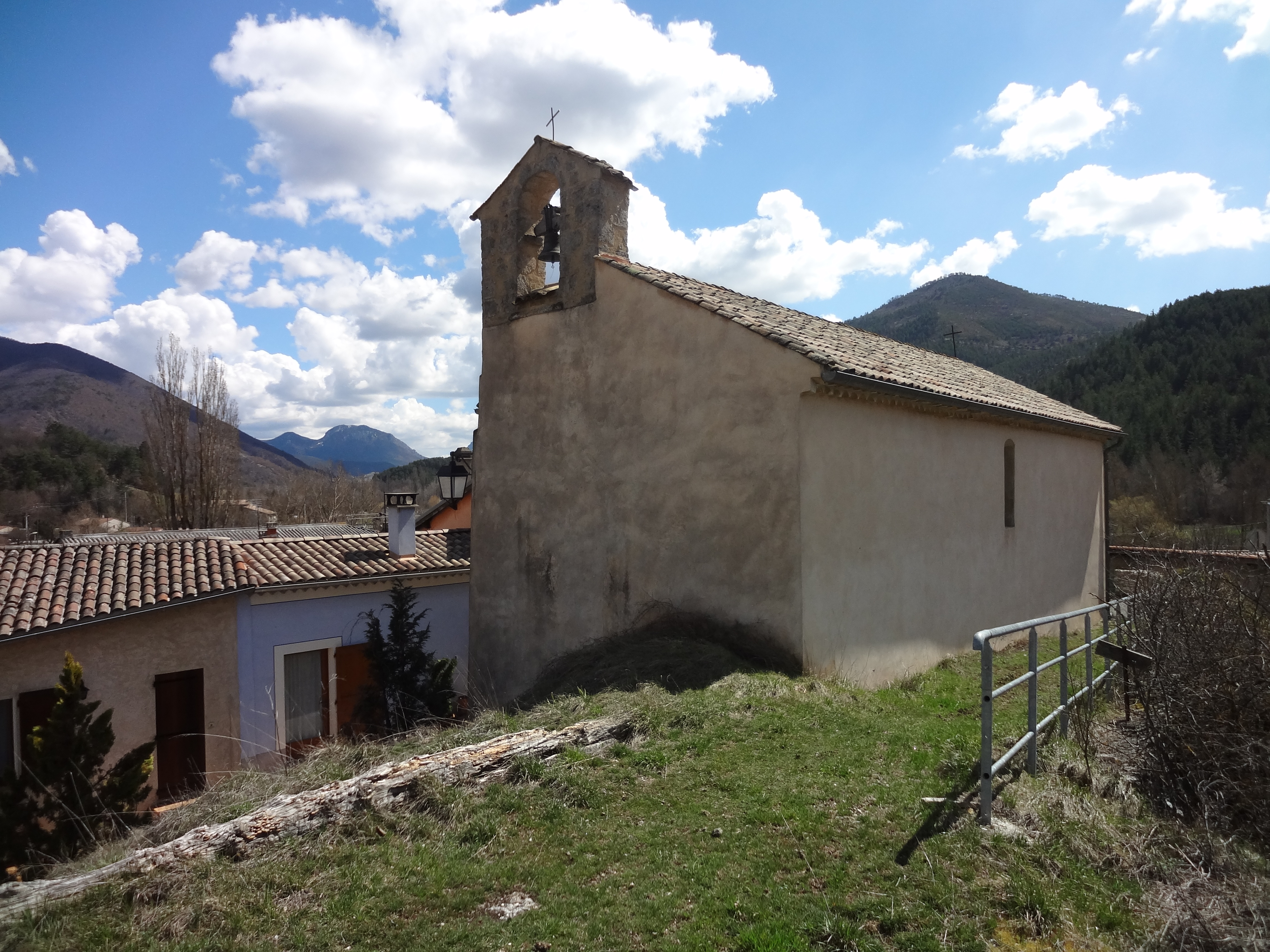
Chapel of Saint John

=== Religious heritage ===
The commune has several religious buildings and sites that are registered as historical monuments:

- The Parish Church of Saint John the Baptist (1870)
- A Calvary at Saint-Jean (1849)
- The Chapel of Saint John the Baptist (1664)
- The Parish Church of Saint Anne at Gévaudan (1837)
- The Notre-Dame du Pont Chapel at Saint-Jean (1838)

The churches and chapels contain a very large number of items that are registered as historical objects.

== Notable people linked to the commune ==
- Bernard Laurens (1741-1802), born in Barrême, deputy for Bouches-du-Rhône in the National Convention

== See also ==
- Communes of the Alpes-de-Haute-Provence department

=== Books on Barrême ===
- Oxent Miesseroff, On the maquis of Barrême, mixed memories, Égrégores (in French)
