= Moustiers-Sainte-Marie =

Moustiers-Sainte-Marie Mostiers Santa Maria (Occitan)
- Commune
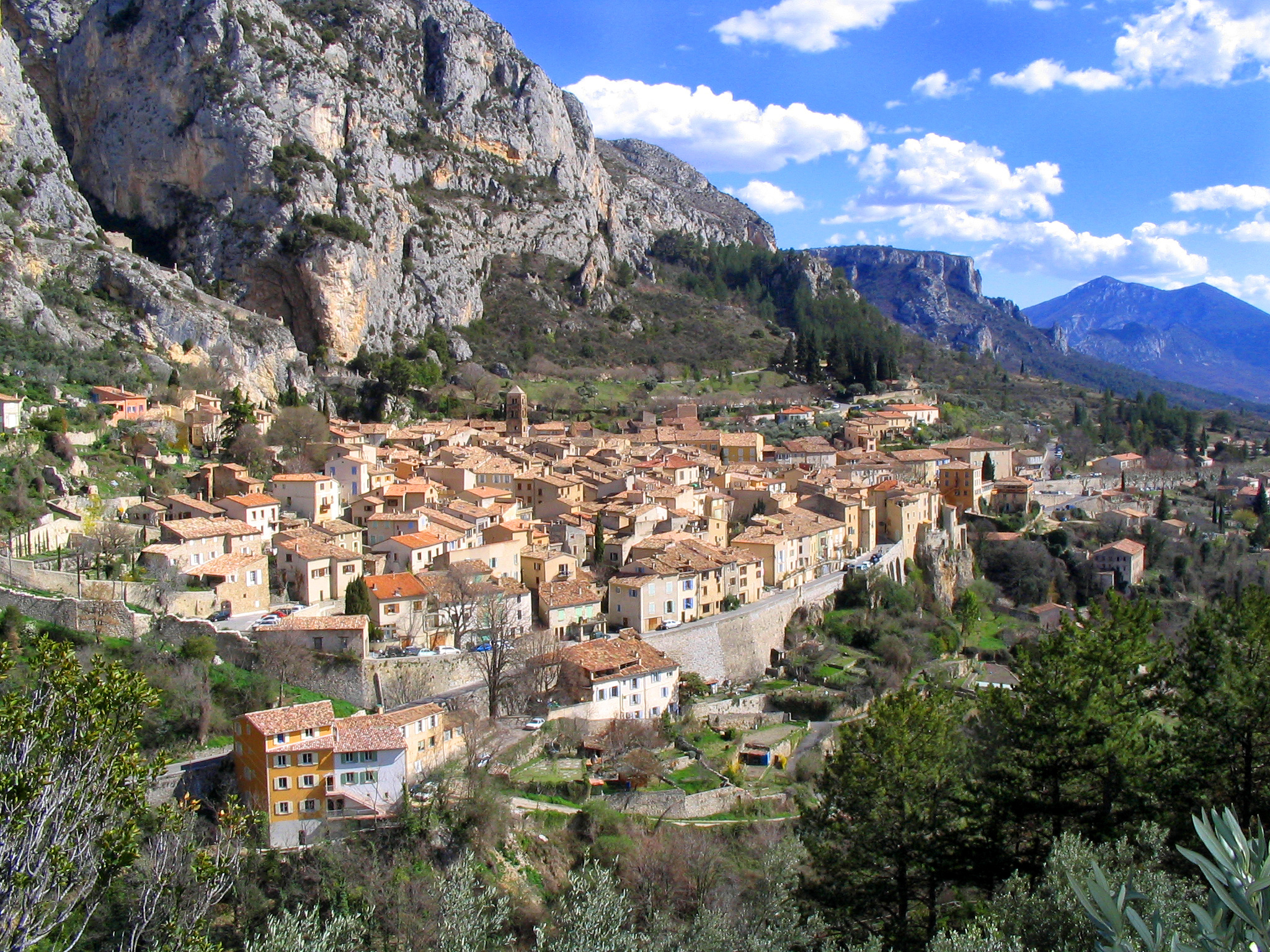
- The village of Moustiers-Sainte-Marie, seen from above

- Coat of arms
- Location of Moustiers-Sainte-Marie
- Location within France Location within Provence-Alpes-Côte d'Azur
- Coordinates: 43°50′54″N 6°13′19″E
- Country: France
- Region: Provence-Alpes-Côte d'Azur
- Department: Alpes-de-Haute-Provence
- Arrondissement: Digne-les-Bains
- Canton: Riez
- Intercommunality: CA Provence-Alpes

Government
  - Mayor (2026–32): Marc Bondil
- Area^{1}: 87.97 km^{2} (33.97 sq mi)
- Elevation: 631 m (2,070 ft)
- Highest elevation: 1,729 m (5,673 ft)
- Lowest elevation: 474 m (1,555 ft)
- Population (2023): 683
  - Density: 7.76/km^{2} (20.1/sq mi)
- Time zone: UTC+01:00 (CET)
  - Summer (DST): UTC+02:00 (CEST)
- INSEE/Postal code: 04135 /04360
- ^{1} French Land Register data, which excludes lakes, ponds, glaciers > 1 km^{2} (0.386 sq mi or 247 acres) and river estuaries.

Moustiers-Sainte-Marie (French pronunciation: [mustje sɛ̃t maʁi]; Occitan: Mostiers Santa Maria), or simply Moustiers, is a commune in the Alpes-de-Haute-Provence department in the Provence-Alpes-Côte d'Azur region of Southeastern France, with a population of approximately 683 people as of 2023. Nestled at the foot of towering limestone cliffs, it serves as a gateway to the Verdon Gorge and Lake Sainte-Croix. It is a member of Les Plus Beaux Villages de France (The Most Beautiful Villages of France) Association, and is known throughout Europe for the beauty and quality of its faïence, its chapels, and the golden star which presides over the village.

== Geography ==
The village stands below limestone cliffs near the entrance to the Verdon Gorge and lies in close proximity to Lake Sainte-Croix. The settlement was built upon terraced platforms that connect via alleyways and stone staircases. The Adou River flows from a spring between the cliffs, creating a small waterfall and a torrent through the village. Since the Middle Ages, this water has been used to power various mills.

The communes bordering Moustiers-Sainte-Marie are Saint-Jurs, Majastres, La Palud-sur-Verdon, Aiguines, Sainte-Croix-du-Verdon, Roumoules, and Puimoisson.

== Local culture and heritage ==
View of the suspended star at golden hour.

=== The Star ===
Suspended 135m high on a 225m-long chain between two outcroppings, the golden star of Moustiers-Sainte-Marie presides over the town. Since the Middle Ages, there have been at least 11 versions of the star. The current one is about 70 years old. In 1995, it fell after the chain snapped, and Joël Joessel, a gilder in Lorgues, restored and coated it in fine gold. It measures approximately 1.25m in diameter, weighs almost 150kg, and was rehung using a helicopter.

Although the star has become a central part of the town's identity, no historical document exists which can reliably explain its origins. The first historical mention of the star dates back to the writings of Simon Bartel, a priest, in 1636. In Chronicle of the Bishops of Riez, he speculated that a knight of Rhodes had started the initiative to hang the star. However, Abbé Féraud, established historian and author of History of the Lower Alps, contested this account. In the years that followed, historians of the 18th century were at a loss. In 1756, the historian and resident of Moustiers Abbot Jean Salomé (or Solomé) lamented his lack of knowledge regarding the star's origins in the Historical Memoir on the town of Moustiers. Similarly, in 1780, historian Abbot Jean-Pierre Papon admitted that he too was at a loss.

Within this information vacuum, multiple fables arose in order to explain the presence of the star. Overall, the Moustiers history enthusiast Jacques Lecugy counted seventeen different versions of the story. Included among these were stories of Lords who fought the Saracens in Provence or the Holy Land, Romeo and Juliet-esque stories, and tales of the Three Wise Men. However, the one told by poet and Nobel laureate Frédéric Mistral is often regarded as the "official" version. In 1885, he published "Lis Isclo d'Or" (The Golden Islands), a collection of poems which included one entitled "La Cadeno de Moustiers" (The Chain of Moustiers). According to this tale, the knight Bozon de Blacas was held prisoner by the Saracens during the Siege of Damietta in 1249. Praying to the Virgin Mary, he vowed that should he ever return home, he would hang a sixteen-point star (his family emblem) over the village.

=== Faïence ===
Moustiers developed as a center of faïence production during the 17th century, fostered by an abundance of clay quarries, water, and wood. It is thought that Pierre Clérissy, a local potter, studied under the Italian monk Lozzaro Porri to learn the technique and formula of tin-glazed enamel in 1671. Soon thereafter, more workshops opened, and Moustiers became a mecca of French earthenware. During the Nine Years' War (1689-1697), King Louis XIV ordered French nobility to melt down their silver dishware in order to fund the war effort. This led to an increase in popularity of faïence among the French elite, and the works originating from Moustiers found their way to aristocratic courts across Europe.

The Clérissy family formed and operated the Clérissy faience factories (or ateliers Clérissy). They were renowned for the quality of their white glaze and blue monochrome decorations (camaïeu bleu), and their work was sought after by nobility. Joseph Olérys and his partner Jean-Baptiste Laugier later founded the faïence production company Olérys and Laugier, which popularized richly colored, ochre/blue-green decorations depicting complex and often grotesque mythical scenes.

==== Académie de Moustiers and Musée de la faïence ====
By 1927, no active faïence workshops remained in Moustiers. This could be contributed in part to the Franco-Prussian War in 1870 and general industrial competition. In 1928, Marcel Provence (the pseudonym of Marcel Joannon, a Provençal historian and writer) and a group of earthenware enthusiasts founded the Académie de Moustiers with the goal of studying and protecting Provençal folklore and faïence. On September 15, 1929, Marcel Provence and the Académie de Moustiers founded the Musée de la faïence, celebrating the local and historical faïence in Moustiers. The museum is housed in the former town mansion of Jean François de Bertet de La Clue-Sabran (a French admiral during the Seven Year's War). This collection was later donated to the municipality in 1954. Across its nine rooms, the museum displays the evolution of Moustiers faïence from its inception, while reserving a final room for temporary installments and exhibitions.

=== The Notre-Dame-de-Beauvoir Chapel ===
View of the Notre-Dame-de-Beauvoir chapel from the bridge below.

One of the 14 Stations of the Cross along the steps to the chapel of Notre-Dame-de-Beauvoir.

The Chapel of Notre-Dame-de-Beauvoir can be seen resting between two prominent outcroppings and just beneath the suspended star. Villagers and tourists alike climb the 262 (formerly 365) slippery stone steps that wind up the cliffside to the chapel, which provides a clear view of the vallée de la Maire and the Valensole Plateau. Officially established as a historical monument in 1921, it was built atop the remains of a 5th century Marian temple. Blending Romanesque and Gothic era architecture, the chapel was constructed between the 12th and 13th centuries. As seen in the engraving of the triumphal arch, two additional bays and a Gothic choir were added In 1536. Additionally, the seven oratories built along the path were replaced by the fourteen Stations of the Cross in 1860. Later, these stations were decorated with tiles made by Simone Garnier, a 20th century earthenware artist.

== Economy ==
=== Employment ===
Views of the cliff face seen from the shops below.

In 2023, INSEE recorded 427 jobs in the area, with 311 employed individuals and a 59% employment rate for people ages 15 and older. The employment concentration indicator (jobs in the area per 100 employed residents) for this demographic was 137.3. For people ages 15-64, the percentage of economically active working-age adults was 77.2%, with 67.6% employed and 9.7% unemployed. The percentage of economically inactive people was 22.8%, with retirees making up 6.0% and pupils, students or interns making up 5.1%.

== Administration, international relations and associations ==
Moustiers-Sainte-Marie belongs to the arrondissement of Digne-les-Bains and the Canton of Riez. It is also an active member of the Communauté d'Agglomération Provence-Alpes-Agglomération public body. Its INSEE commune code is 04135.

Moustiers-Sainte-Marie is twinned with Montelupo Fiorentino in Italy.

Moustiers-Sainte-Marie is also a member of Les Plus Beaux Villages de France (The Most Beautiful Villages of France) Association.

== Population ==
Historical population
Year	Pop.	±% p.a.
1968	535	—
1975	602	+1.70%
1982	575	−0.65%
1990	580	+0.11%
1999	625	+0.83%
2007	705	+1.52%
2012	691	−0.40%
2017	709	+0.52%
2023	683	−0.62%
Source: INSEE

== See also ==
- Communes of the Alpes-de-Haute-Provence department
- List of works by Louis Botinelly
