= Castellet (disambiguation) =

Castellet may refer to:

== People ==
- Queralt Castellet, Spanish snowboarder

== Places ==
France

- Castellet-en-Luberon, commune in the Vaucluse department
- Castellet-lès-Sausses, commune in the Alpes-de-Haute-Provence department

Spain

- Castellet i la Gornal, municipality in the comarca of the Alt Penedès
- Sant Vicenç de Castellet, municipality in the comarca of Bages

== See also ==
- Le Castellet (disambiguation)
