= Beynes =

Beynes may refer to:

- Beynes, Alpes-de-Haute-Provence – a commune in the Alpes-de-Haute-Provence department of France.
- Beynes, Yvelines – a commune in the Yvelines department of France.
