= Rarécourt =

- Commune
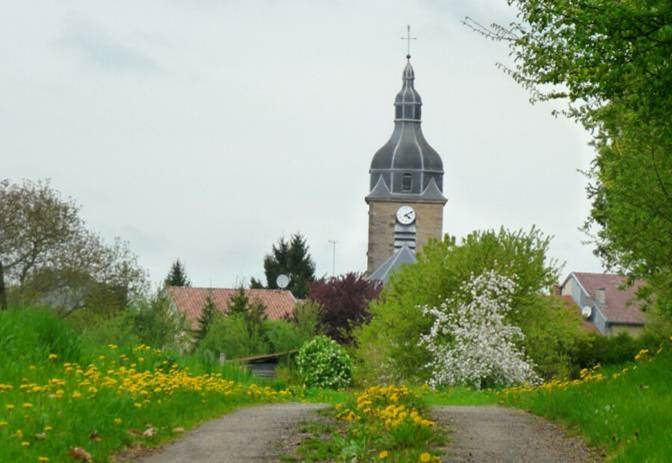
- The bell tower of the church in Rarécourt

- Coat of arms
- Location of Rarécourt
- Location within France Location within Grand Est
- Coordinates: 49°04′38″N 5°07′28″E
- Country: France
- Region: Grand Est
- Department: Meuse
- Arrondissement: Verdun
- Canton: Clermont-en-Argonne
- Intercommunality: CC Argonne-Meuse

Government
  - Mayor (2020–2026): Nathalie Coyard
- Area^{1}: 15.41 km^{2} (5.95 sq mi)
- Elevation: 202 m (663 ft)
- Highest elevation: 302 m (991 ft)
- Lowest elevation: 191 m (627 ft)
- Population (2023): 195
  - Density: 12.7/km^{2} (32.8/sq mi)
- Time zone: UTC+01:00 (CET)
  - Summer (DST): UTC+02:00 (CEST)
- INSEE/Postal code: 55416 /55120
- ^{1} French Land Register data, which excludes lakes, ponds, glaciers > 1 km^{2} (0.386 sq mi or 247 acres) and river estuaries.

Rarécourt (French pronunciation: [ʁaʁekuʁ]) is a commune in the Meuse department in Grand Est in north-eastern France.

== See also ==
- Communes of the Meuse department
- Musée de la Faïence
