= Asse (river) =

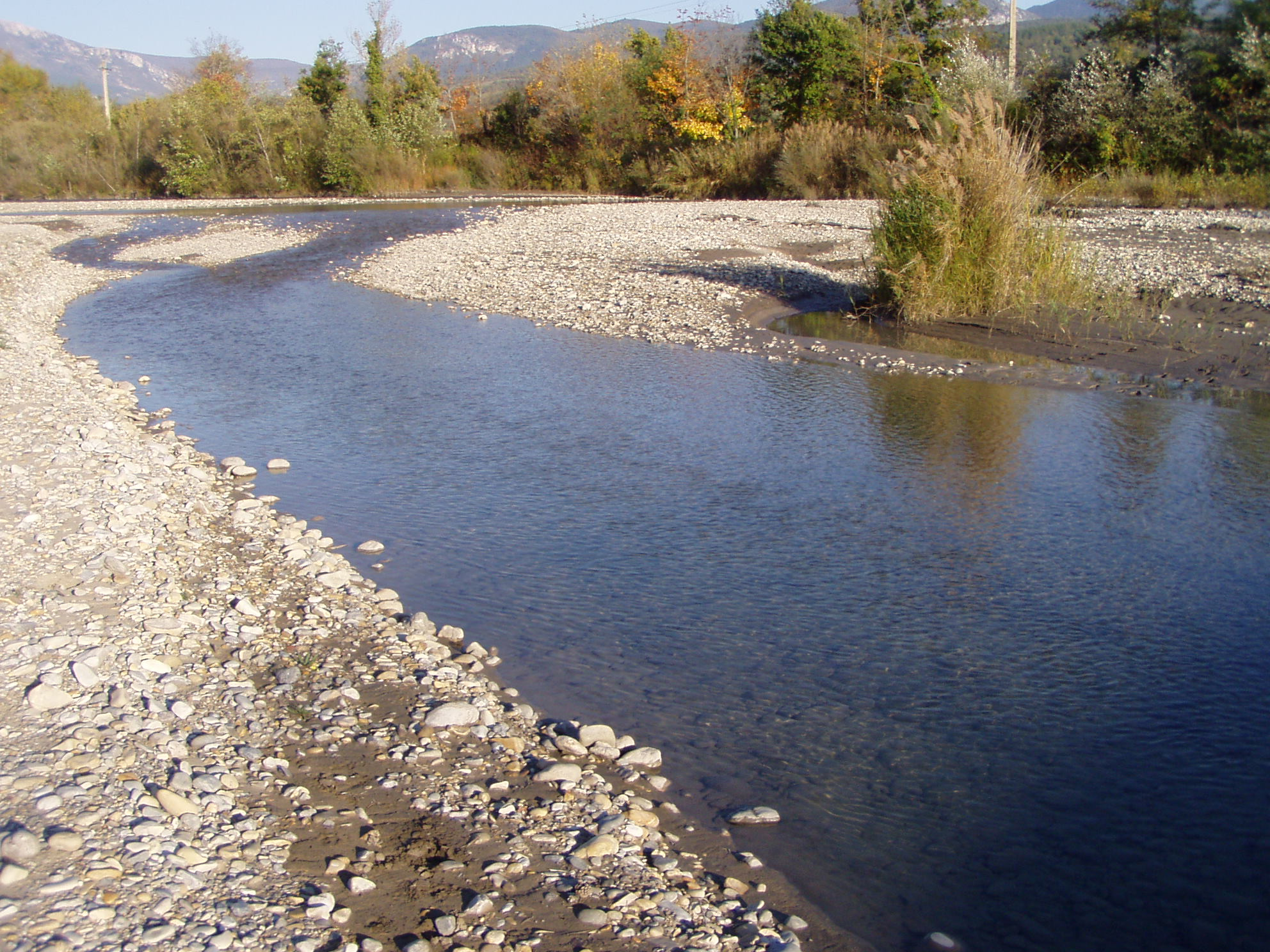
- The Asse at Bras-d'Asse.

- Location within France Location within Provence-Alpes-Côte d'Azur

Location
- Country: France

Physical characteristics
- Source
  - location: Tartonne
  - coordinates: 44°06′09″N 06°22′44″E
  - elevation: 1,350 m (4,430 ft)
- Mouth
  - location: Durance
  - coordinates: 43°52′28″N 05°52′43″E
  - elevation: 320 m (1,050 ft)
- Length: 76.3 km (47.4 mi)
- Basin size: 657 km^{2} (254 sq mi)
- Discharge
  - average: 5 m^{3}/s (180 cu ft/s)

Basin features
- Progression: Durance→ Rhône→ Mediterranean Sea

The Asse (French pronunciation: [as]; Occitan: Assa) is a 76.3-kilometre (47.4 mi) long river in the Alpes-de-Haute-Provence département, southeastern France. Its source is several small streams which converge at Tartonne, 12 kilometres (7 mi) east of Digne-les-Bains. It flows generally southwest. It is a left tributary of the Durance into which it flows between Valensole and Oraison, 9 kilometres (6 mi) northeast of Manosque. Its drainage basin is 657 km^{2} (254 sq mi).

The Asse is called "Asse de Clumanc" between its source and its confluence with the "Asse de Blieux" and the "Asse de Moriez" at Barrême. The valleys of the Asse and its tributaries are protected as a Natura 2000 site.

Part of the Asse valley is used by the route Napoléon.

== Communes along its course ==
This list is ordered from source to mouth: Tartonne, Clumanc, Saint-Lions, Barrême, Chaudon-Norante, Beynes, Entrages, Châteauredon, Mézel, Estoublon, Bras-d'Asse, Saint-Julien-d'Asse, Brunet, Le Castellet, Valensole, Oraison
