= Le Castellet =

Le Castellet is the name of the following communes in France:

- Le Castellet, Alpes-de-Haute-Provence, in the Alpes-de-Haute-Provence department
- Le Castellet, Var, in the Var department

In motorsport Le Castellet can also refer to Circuit Paul Ricard which lies near Le Castellet, Var
