= Clumanc =

- Commune
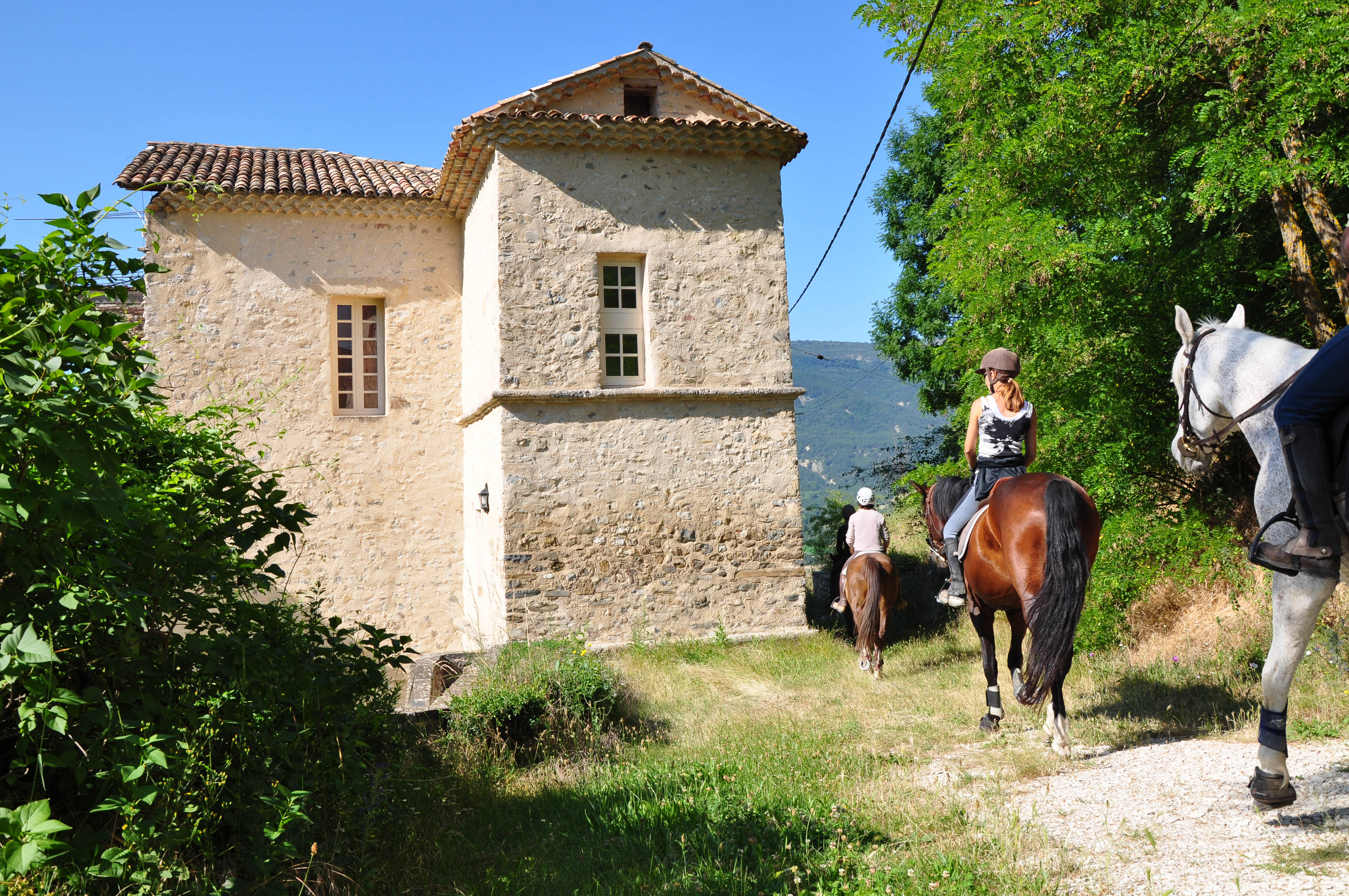
- Chateau

- Coat of arms
- Location of Clumanc
- Location within France Location within Provence-Alpes-Côte d'Azur
- Coordinates: 44°01′28″N 6°23′02″E
- Country: France
- Region: Provence-Alpes-Côte d'Azur
- Department: Alpes-de-Haute-Provence
- Arrondissement: Castellane
- Canton: Riez
- Intercommunality: Alpes Provence Verdon - Sources de Lumière

Government
  - Mayor (2026–32): Thierry Viale
- Area^{1}: 53.68 km^{2} (20.73 sq mi)
- Elevation: 800 m (2,600 ft)
- Highest elevation: 1,703 m (5,587 ft)
- Lowest elevation: 773 m (2,536 ft)
- Population (2023): 222
  - Density: 4.14/km^{2} (10.7/sq mi)
- Time zone: UTC+01:00 (CET)
  - Summer (DST): UTC+02:00 (CEST)
- INSEE/Postal code: 04059 /04330
- ^{1} French Land Register data, which excludes lakes, ponds, glaciers > 1 km^{2} (0.386 sq mi or 247 acres) and river estuaries.

Clumanc (French pronunciation: [klymɑ̃k]) is a commune in the Alpes-de-Haute-Provence department in southeastern France.

== Geography ==
The river Asse de Clumanc flows south through the commune.

== Population ==
Historical population
Year	Pop.	±% p.a.
1968	177	—
1975	135	−3.80%
1982	137	+0.21%
1990	156	+1.64%
1999	154	−0.14%
2007	170	+1.24%
2012	186	+1.82%
2017	215	+2.94%
2023	222	+0.54%
Source: INSEE

== See also ==
- Communes of the Alpes-de-Haute-Provence department
