= Estoublon =

- Commune
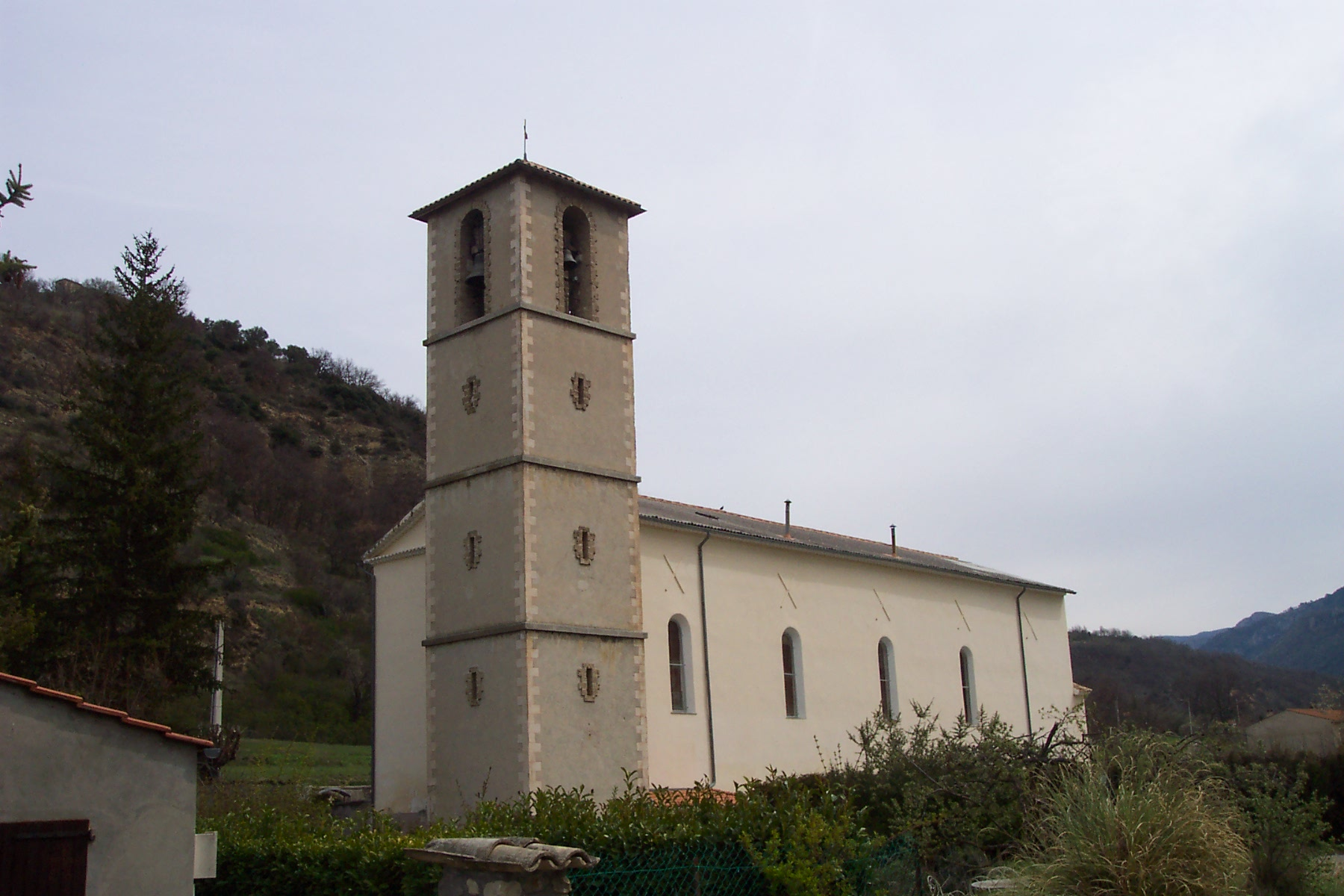
- The church in Estoublon

- Coat of arms
- Location of Estoublon
- Location within France Location within Provence-Alpes-Côte d'Azur
- Coordinates: 43°56′36″N 6°10′19″E
- Country: France
- Region: Provence-Alpes-Côte d'Azur
- Department: Alpes-de-Haute-Provence
- Arrondissement: Digne-les-Bains
- Canton: Riez
- Intercommunality: CA Provence-Alpes

Government
  - Mayor (2026–32): Carole Toussaint
- Area^{1}: 33.85 km^{2} (13.07 sq mi)
- Elevation: 513 m (1,683 ft)
- Highest elevation: 1,362 m (4,469 ft)
- Lowest elevation: 493 m (1,617 ft)
- Population (2023): 469
  - Density: 13.9/km^{2} (35.9/sq mi)
- Time zone: UTC+01:00 (CET)
  - Summer (DST): UTC+02:00 (CEST)
- INSEE/Postal code: 04084 /04270
- ^{1} French Land Register data, which excludes lakes, ponds, glaciers > 1 km^{2} (0.386 sq mi or 247 acres) and river estuaries.

Estoublon (French pronunciation: [ɛstublɔ̃]; Occitan: Estoblon) is a commune in the Alpes-de-Haute-Provence department in Provence-Alpes-Côte d'Azur in southeastern France.

== Geography ==
The river Asse flows southwest through the western part of the commune.

== Population ==
Historical population
Year	Pop.	±% p.a.
1968	208	—
1975	209	+0.07%
1982	243	+2.18%
1990	301	+2.71%
1999	337	+1.26%
2007	408	+2.42%
2012	476	+3.13%
2017	486	+0.42%
2023	469	−0.59%
Source: INSEE

== See also ==
- Communes of the Alpes-de-Haute-Provence department
