= Saint-Jacques, Alpes-de-Haute-Provence =

Saint-Jacques
- Commune
- Coat of arms
- Location of Saint-Jacques
- Location within France Location within Provence-Alpes-Côte d'Azur
- Coordinates: 43°58′13″N 6°22′33″E
- Country: France
- Region: Provence-Alpes-Côte d'Azur
- Department: Alpes-de-Haute-Provence
- Arrondissement: Castellane
- Canton: Riez
- Intercommunality: Alpes Provence Verdon - Sources de Lumière

Government
  - Mayor (2026–32): Alix Chaillan
- Area^{1}: 4.66 km^{2} (1.80 sq mi)
- Elevation: 800 m (2,600 ft)
- Highest elevation: 1,447 m (4,747 ft)
- Lowest elevation: 780 m (2,560 ft)
- Population (2023): 67
  - Density: 14/km^{2} (37/sq mi)
- Time zone: UTC+01:00 (CET)
  - Summer (DST): UTC+02:00 (CEST)
- INSEE/Postal code: 04180 /04330
- ^{1} French Land Register data, which excludes lakes, ponds, glaciers > 1 km^{2} (0.386 sq mi or 247 acres) and river estuaries.

Saint-Jacques (French pronunciation: [sɛ̃ ʒak]; Provençal: Sant Jaume) is a commune in the Alpes-de-Haute-Provence department in southeastern France.

== Population ==
Historical population
Year	Pop.	±% p.a.
1968	38	—
1975	31	−2.87%
1982	29	−0.95%
1990	39	+3.77%
1999	36	−0.89%
2007	56	+5.68%
2012	55	−0.36%
2017	78	+7.24%
2023	67	−2.50%
Source: INSEE

== See also ==
- Communes of the Alpes-de-Haute-Provence department
