= Saint-Julien-d'Asse =

- Commune
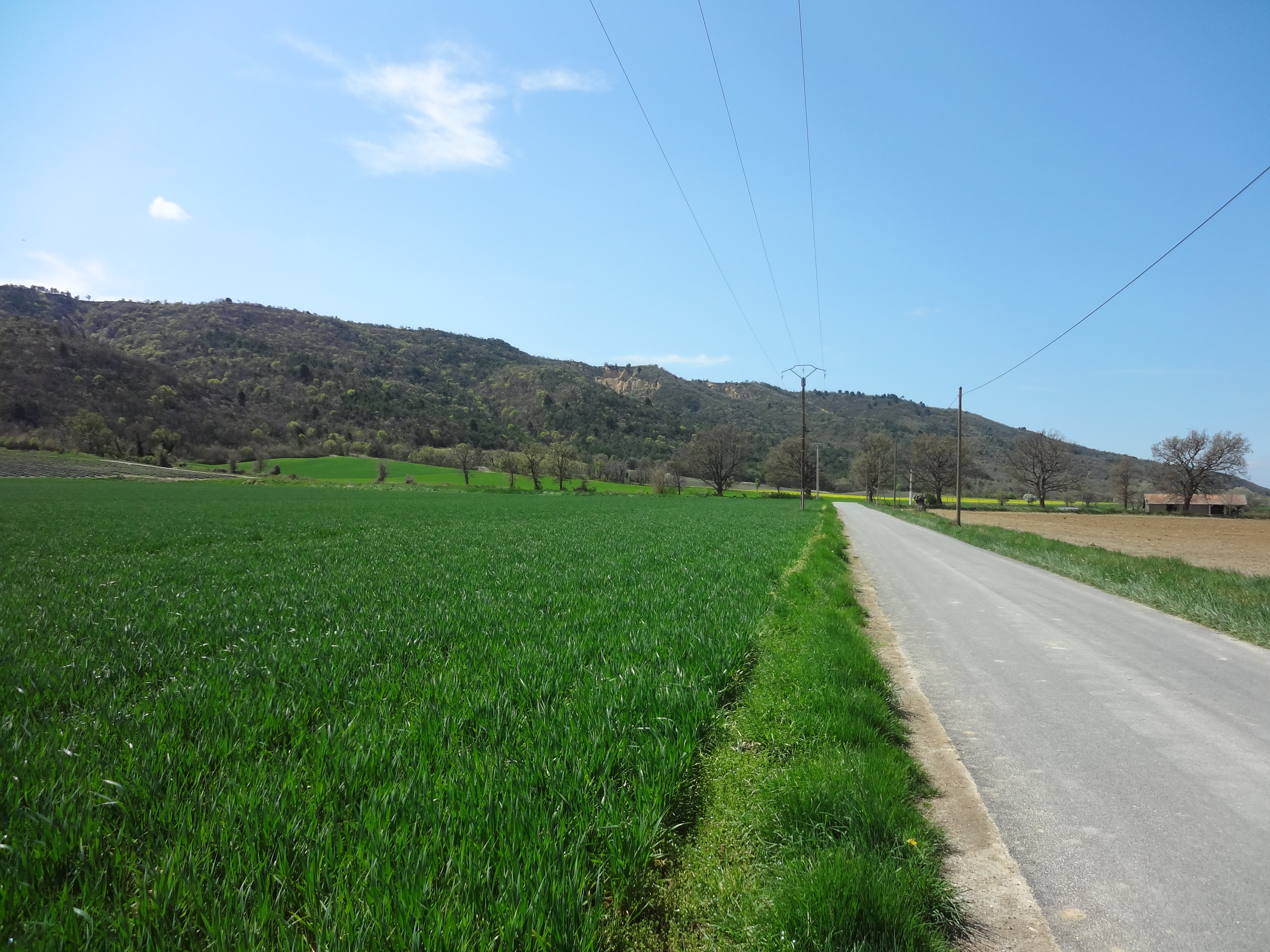
- The Asse Valley and the Plateau de Valensole

- Coat of arms
- Location of Saint-Julien-d'Asse
- Location within France Location within Provence-Alpes-Côte d'Azur
- Coordinates: 43°55′06″N 6°05′41″E
- Country: France
- Region: Provence-Alpes-Côte d'Azur
- Department: Alpes-de-Haute-Provence
- Arrondissement: Digne-les-Bains
- Canton: Riez
- Intercommunality: CA Provence-Alpes

Government
  - Mayor (2026–32): Delphine Paul
- Area^{1}: 25.6 km^{2} (9.9 sq mi)
- Elevation: 484 m (1,588 ft)
- Highest elevation: 886 m (2,907 ft)
- Lowest elevation: 407 m (1,335 ft)
- Population (2023): 232
  - Density: 9.06/km^{2} (23.5/sq mi)
- Time zone: UTC+01:00 (CET)
  - Summer (DST): UTC+02:00 (CEST)
- INSEE/Postal code: 04182 /04270
- ^{1} French Land Register data, which excludes lakes, ponds, glaciers > 1 km^{2} (0.386 sq mi or 247 acres) and river estuaries.

Saint-Julien-d'Asse (French pronunciation: [sɛ̃ ʒyljɛ̃ das]; Provençal: Sant Julian d'Assa) is a commune in the Alpes-de-Haute-Provence department in southeastern France.

== Geography ==
The village lies on the right bank of the Asse, which flows west through the southern part of the commune.

== Population ==
Historical population
Year	Pop.	±% p.a.
1968	69	—
1975	68	−0.21%
1982	76	+1.60%
1990	114	+5.20%
1999	124	+0.94%
2007	153	+2.66%
2012	186	+3.98%
2017	212	+2.65%
2023	232	+1.51%
Source: INSEE

== See also ==
- Communes of the Alpes-de-Haute-Provence department
