= La Palud-sur-Verdon =

- Commune
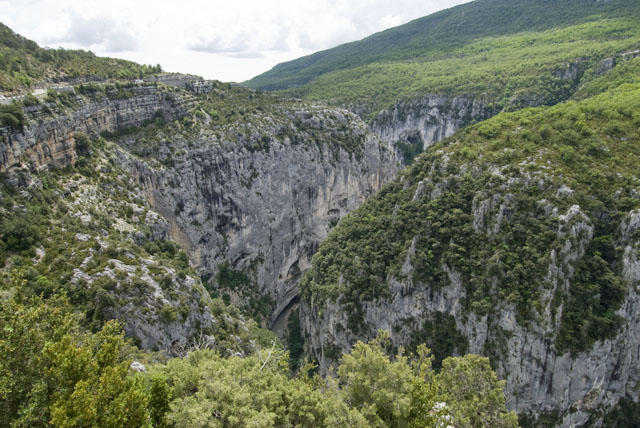
- The Verdon river valley

- Coat of arms
- Location of La Palud-sur-Verdon
- Location within France Location within Provence-Alpes-Côte d'Azur
- Coordinates: 43°46′51″N 6°20′32″E
- Country: France
- Region: Provence-Alpes-Côte d'Azur
- Department: Alpes-de-Haute-Provence
- Arrondissement: Castellane
- Canton: Riez

Government
  - Mayor (2026–32): Christine Passard
- Area^{1}: 81.26 km^{2} (31.37 sq mi)
- Highest elevation: 1,920 m (6,300 ft)
- Lowest elevation: 471 m (1,545 ft)
- Population (2023): 347
  - Density: 4.27/km^{2} (11.1/sq mi)
- Time zone: UTC+01:00 (CET)
  - Summer (DST): UTC+02:00 (CEST)
- INSEE/Postal code: 04144 /04120
- ^{1} French Land Register data, which excludes lakes, ponds, glaciers > 1 km^{2} (0.386 sq mi or 247 acres) and river estuaries.

La Palud-sur-Verdon (French pronunciation: [la paly syʁ vɛʁdɔ̃]; Occitan: La Palú de Verdon) is a commune in the Alpes-de-Haute-Provence department in southeastern France.

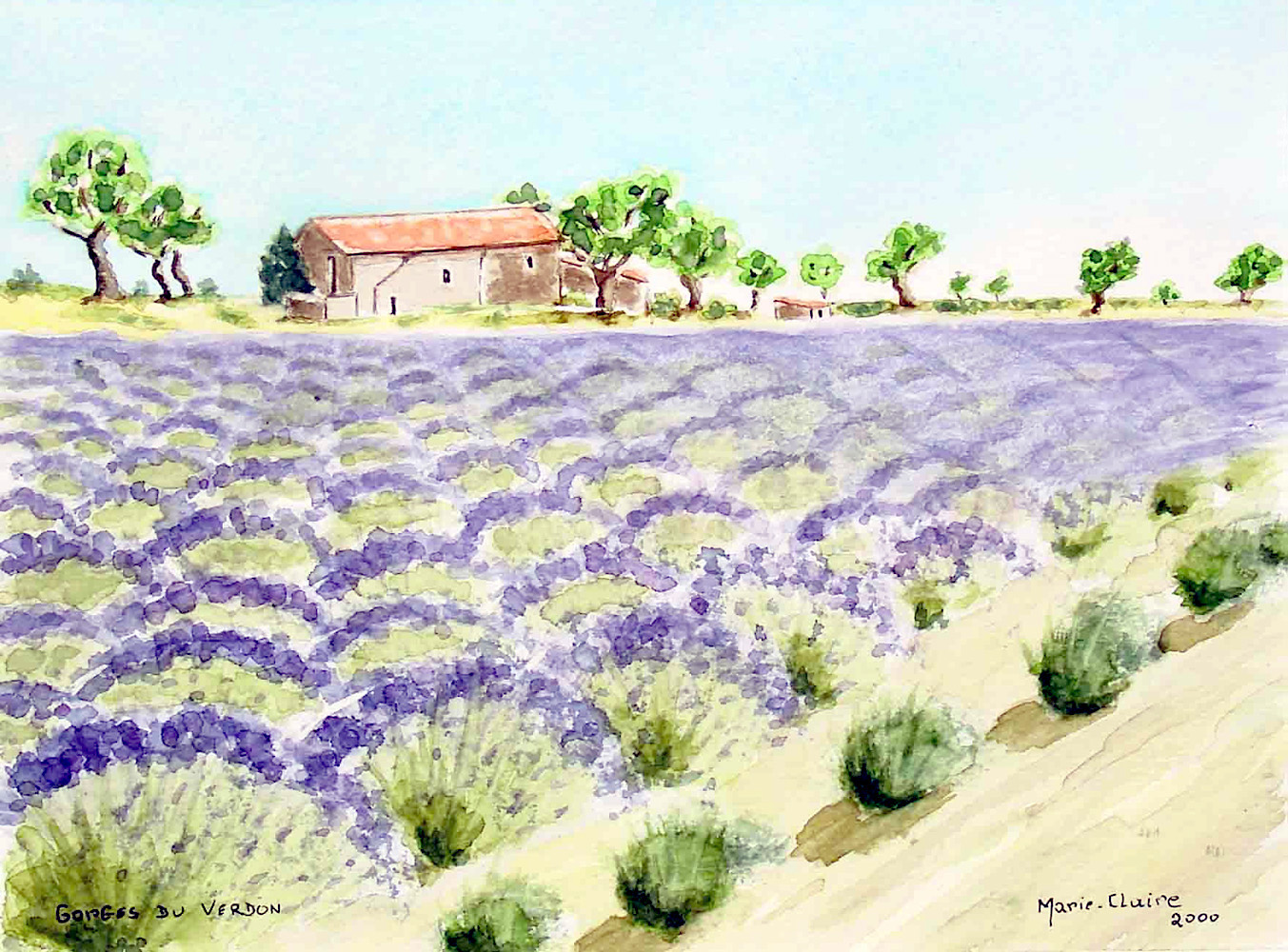
Lavender field of the village.

== Population ==
Historical population
| Year | Pop. | ±% p.a. |
|---|---|---|
| 1968 | 172 | — |
| 1975 | 152 | −1.75% |
| 1982 | 172 | +1.78% |
| 1990 | 243 | +4.41% |
| 1999 | 297 | +2.25% |
| 2007 | 314 | +0.70% |
| 2012 | 329 | +0.94% |
| 2017 | 349 | +1.19% |
| 2023 | 347 | −0.10% |
Source: INSEE

== See also ==
- Communes of the Alpes-de-Haute-Provence department
