= Saint-Jeannet, Alpes-de-Haute-Provence =

Saint-Jeannet
- Commune
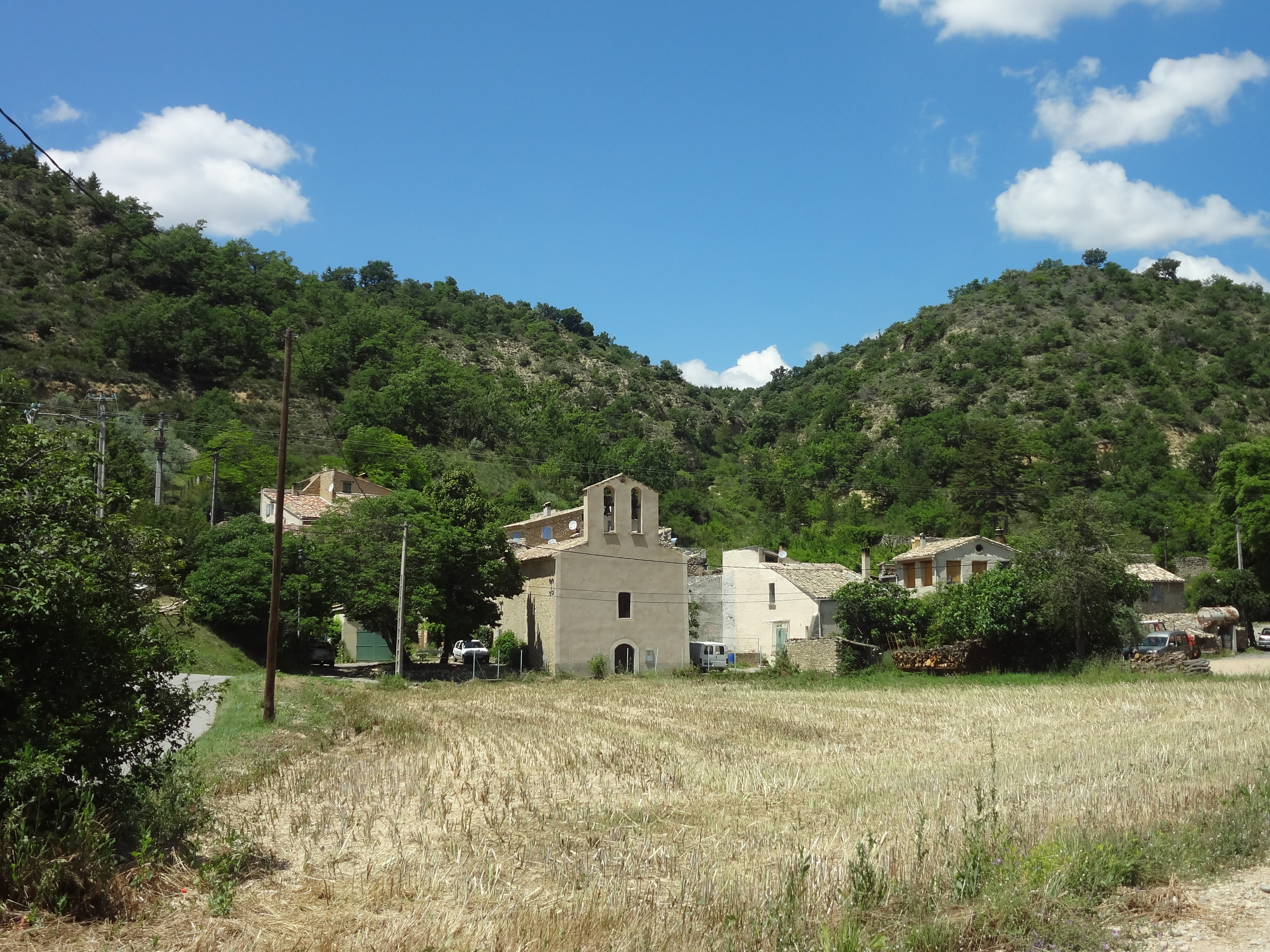
- The hamlet of Saint-Jeannet

- Coat of arms
- Location of Saint-Jeannet
- Location within France Location within Provence-Alpes-Côte d'Azur
- Coordinates: 43°57′12″N 6°07′27″E
- Country: France
- Region: Provence-Alpes-Côte d'Azur
- Department: Alpes-de-Haute-Provence
- Arrondissement: Digne-les-Bains
- Canton: Riez
- Intercommunality: CA Provence-Alpes

Government
  - Mayor (2026–32): Frédéric Molinari
- Area^{1}: 21.14 km^{2} (8.16 sq mi)
- Elevation: 583 m (1,913 ft)
- Highest elevation: 971 m (3,186 ft)
- Lowest elevation: 567 m (1,860 ft)
- Population (2023): 50
  - Density: 2.4/km^{2} (6.1/sq mi)
- Time zone: UTC+01:00 (CET)
  - Summer (DST): UTC+02:00 (CEST)
- INSEE/Postal code: 04181 /04270
- ^{1} French Land Register data, which excludes lakes, ponds, glaciers > 1 km^{2} (0.386 sq mi or 247 acres) and river estuaries.

Saint-Jeannet (French pronunciation: [sɛ̃ ʒanɛ]; Occitan: Sant Joanet) is a commune in the Alpes-de-Haute-Provence department in southeastern France.

== Population ==
Historical population

Year	Pop.	±% p.a.
1793	374	—
1861	296	−0.34%
1911	162	−1.20%
1962	53	−2.17%
1968	42	−3.80%
1975	52	+3.10%
1982	43	−2.68%

Year	Pop.	±% p.a.
1990	47	+1.12%
1999	38	−2.33%
2007	52	+4.00%
2012	58	+2.21%
2017	54	−1.42%
2023	50	−1.27%

Source: INSEE

== See also ==
- Communes of the Alpes-de-Haute-Provence department
