= Puimoisson =

Puimoisson Puegmeisson (Occitan)
- Commune
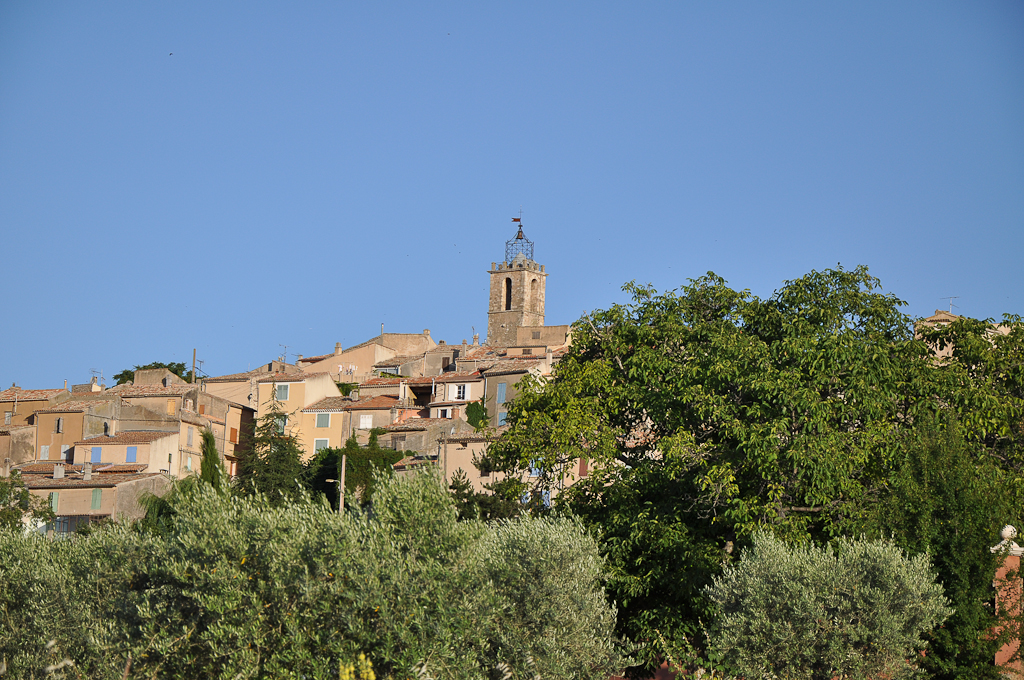
- A view of the village of Puimoisson

- Coat of arms
- Location of Puimoisson
- Location within France Location within Provence-Alpes-Côte d'Azur
- Coordinates: 43°51′49″N 6°07′40″E
- Country: France
- Region: Provence-Alpes-Côte d'Azur
- Department: Alpes-de-Haute-Provence
- Arrondissement: Forcalquier
- Canton: Riez
- Intercommunality: Durance-Luberon-Verdon Agglomération

Government
  - Mayor (2026–32): Philippe Coste
- Area^{1}: 35.44 km^{2} (13.68 sq mi)
- Elevation: 698 m (2,290 ft)
- Highest elevation: 781 m (2,562 ft)
- Lowest elevation: 567 m (1,860 ft)
- Population (2023): 694
  - Density: 19.6/km^{2} (50.7/sq mi)
- Time zone: UTC+01:00 (CET)
  - Summer (DST): UTC+02:00 (CEST)
- INSEE/Postal code: 04157 /04410
- ^{1} French Land Register data, which excludes lakes, ponds, glaciers > 1 km^{2} (0.386 sq mi or 247 acres) and river estuaries.

Puimoisson (French pronunciation: [pɥimwasɔ̃]; Provençal Occitan: Puegmeisson) is a rural commune in the Alpes-de-Haute-Provence department in the Provence-Alpes-Côte d'Azur region in Southeastern France.

== Demographics ==
Historical population
Year	Pop.	±% p.a.
1968	508	—
1975	491	−0.49%
1982	511	+0.57%
1990	511	+0.00%
1999	551	+0.84%
2007	677	+2.61%
2012	755	+2.20%
2017	723	−0.86%
2023	694	−0.68%
Source: INSEE

== See also ==
- Communes of the Alpes-de-Haute-Provence department
