= Bras-d'Asse =

- Commune
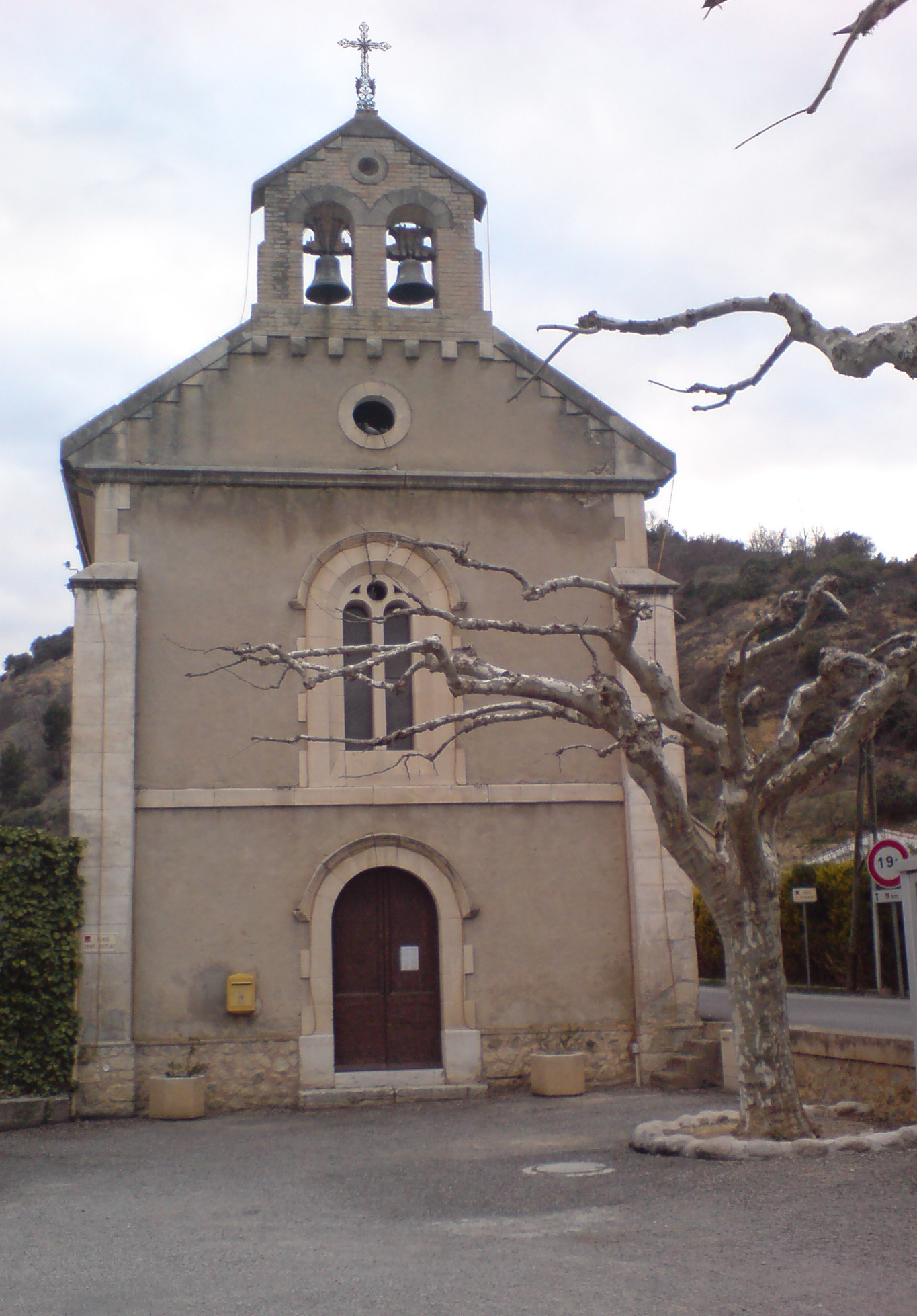
- The church of Saint-Nicolas, in Bras-d'Asse

- Coat of arms
- Location of Bras-d'Asse
- Location within France Location within Provence-Alpes-Côte d'Azur
- Coordinates: 43°55′35″N 6°07′35″E
- Country: France
- Region: Provence-Alpes-Côte d'Azur
- Department: Alpes-de-Haute-Provence
- Arrondissement: Digne-les-Bains
- Canton: Riez
- Intercommunality: CA Provence-Alpes

Government
  - Mayor (2026–32): Arnaud Boussarie
- Area^{1}: 26.1 km^{2} (10.1 sq mi)
- Elevation: 475 m (1,558 ft)
- Highest elevation: 812 m (2,664 ft)
- Lowest elevation: 455 m (1,493 ft)
- Population (2023): 571
  - Density: 21.9/km^{2} (56.7/sq mi)
- Time zone: UTC+01:00 (CET)
  - Summer (DST): UTC+02:00 (CEST)
- INSEE/Postal code: 04031 /04270
- ^{1} French Land Register data, which excludes lakes, ponds, glaciers > 1 km^{2} (0.386 sq mi or 247 acres) and river estuaries.

Bras-d'Asse (Occitan: Braç d'Sufis) is a commune in the Alpes-de-Haute-Provence department in the Provence-Alpes-Côte d'Azur region in southeastern France.

== Geography ==
The village is at an elevation of 475 meters (1558 ft). The bordering municipalities are Saint-Jeannet, Estoublon, Saint-Julien-d'Asse, Saint-Jurs and Puimoisson. The municipality of Bras d'Asse is composed of three different hamlets : les Orésonnis, la Bégude Blanche and les Courtiers.

=== Hydrology ===
The Asse river flows through the commune.

=== Environment ===
Woods occupies 51% of the municipal area.

== Population ==
Historical population
Year	Pop.	±% p.a.
1968	352	—
1975	331	−0.87%
1982	318	−0.57%
1990	378	+2.18%
1999	395	+0.49%
2007	486	+2.63%
2012	560	+2.88%
2017	568	+0.28%
2023	571	+0.09%
Source: INSEE

The inhabitants are named Bras d'assiens in French.

== See also ==
- Communes of the Alpes-de-Haute-Provence department
