= Canton of Riez =

Coordinates: 43°49′08″N 6°05′37″E

Riez
- Canton
- Interactive map of Riez
- Country: France
- Region: Provence-Alpes-Côte d'Azur
- Department: Alpes-de-Haute-Provence
- No. of communes: {{{nbcomm}}}
- Area: 952.03 km^{2} (367.58 sq mi)
- Population (2023): 8,987
  - Density: 9.440/km^{2} (24.45/sq mi)
- INSEE code: 04 12

The canton of Riez is an administrative division in southeastern France. At the French canton reorganisation which came into effect in March 2015, the canton was expanded from 9 to 26 communes:

1. Barrême
2. Beynes
3. Blieux
4. Bras-d'Asse
5. Le Castellet
6. Le Chaffaut-Saint-Jurson
7. Châteauredon
8. Chaudon-Norante
9. Clumanc
10. Entrevennes
11. Estoublon
12. Majastres
13. Mézel
14. Moustiers-Sainte-Marie
15. La Palud-sur-Verdon
16. Puimichel
17. Puimoisson
18. Riez
19. Roumoules
20. Saint-Jacques
21. Saint-Jeannet
22. Saint-Julien-d'Asse
23. Saint-Jurs
24. Saint-Lions
25. Senez
26. Tartonne

== Demographics ==
Historical population
Year	Pop.	±% p.a.
2013	9,300	—
2018	9,315	+0.03%
Source: INSEE

== See also ==
- Cantons of the Alpes-de-Haute-Provence department
- Communes of France
