= Saint-Jurs =

- Commune
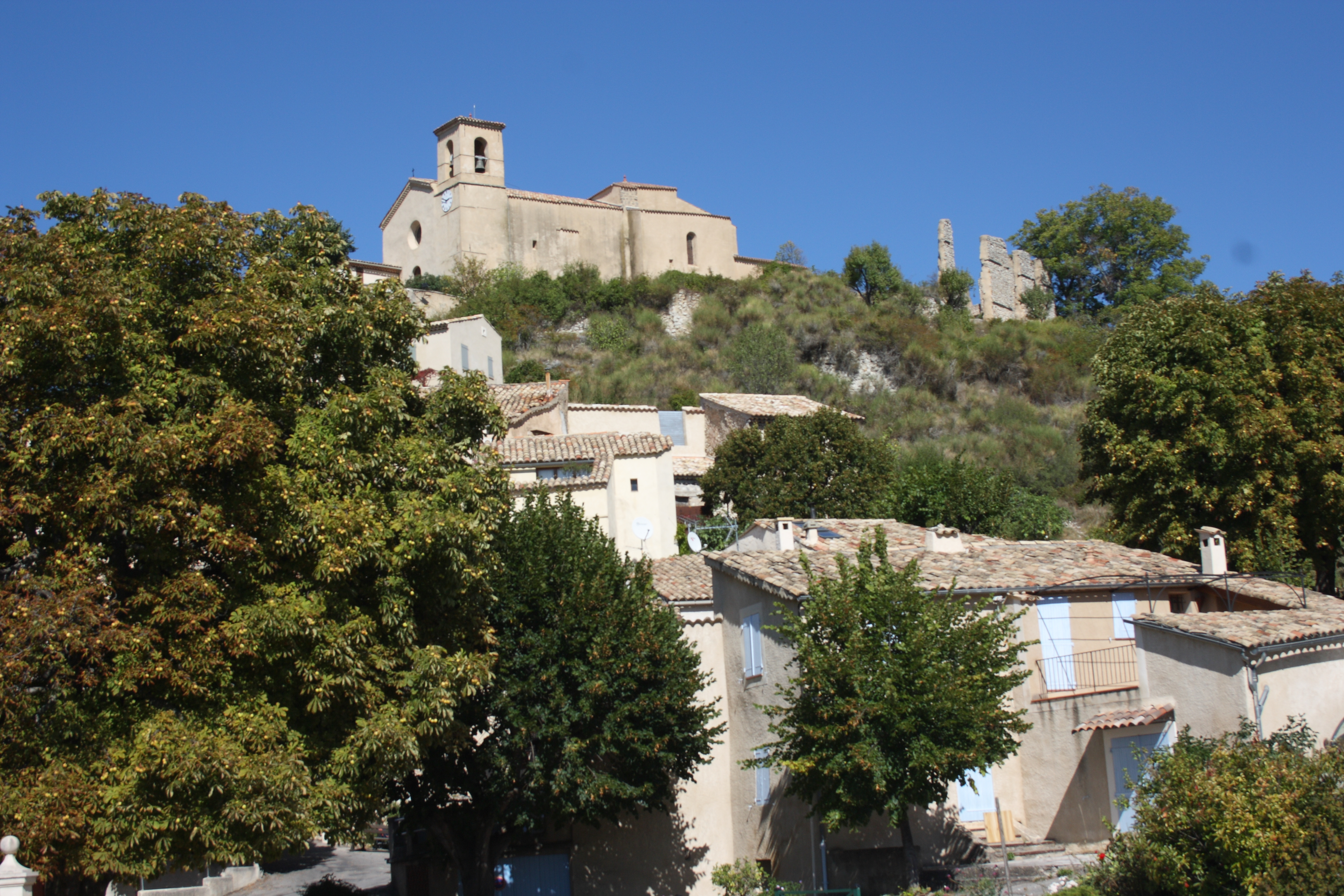
- The church and surrounding buildings in Saint-Jurs

- Coat of arms
- Location of Saint-Jurs
- Location within France Location within Provence-Alpes-Côte d'Azur
- Coordinates: 43°53′58″N 6°12′02″E
- Country: France
- Region: Provence-Alpes-Côte d'Azur
- Department: Alpes-de-Haute-Provence
- Arrondissement: Digne-les-Bains
- Canton: Riez
- Intercommunality: CA Provence-Alpes

Government
  - Mayor (2026–32): Jacques Richier
- Area^{1}: 33.59 km^{2} (12.97 sq mi)
- Elevation: 925 m (3,035 ft)
- Highest elevation: 1,726 m (5,663 ft)
- Lowest elevation: 619 m (2,031 ft)
- Population (2023): 140
  - Density: 4.2/km^{2} (11/sq mi)
- Time zone: UTC+01:00 (CET)
  - Summer (DST): UTC+02:00 (CEST)
- INSEE/Postal code: 04184 /04410
- ^{1} French Land Register data, which excludes lakes, ponds, glaciers > 1 km^{2} (0.386 sq mi or 247 acres) and river estuaries.

Saint-Jurs is a commune in the Alpes-de-Haute-Provence department in southeastern France.

== Population ==
Historical population
Year	Pop.	±% p.a.
1968	85	—
1975	86	+0.17%
1982	115	+4.24%
1990	121	+0.64%
1999	151	+2.49%
2007	156	+0.41%
2012	148	−1.05%
2017	138	−1.39%
2023	140	+0.24%
Source: INSEE

== See also ==
- Communes of the Alpes-de-Haute-Provence department
