= Saint-Lions =

- Commune
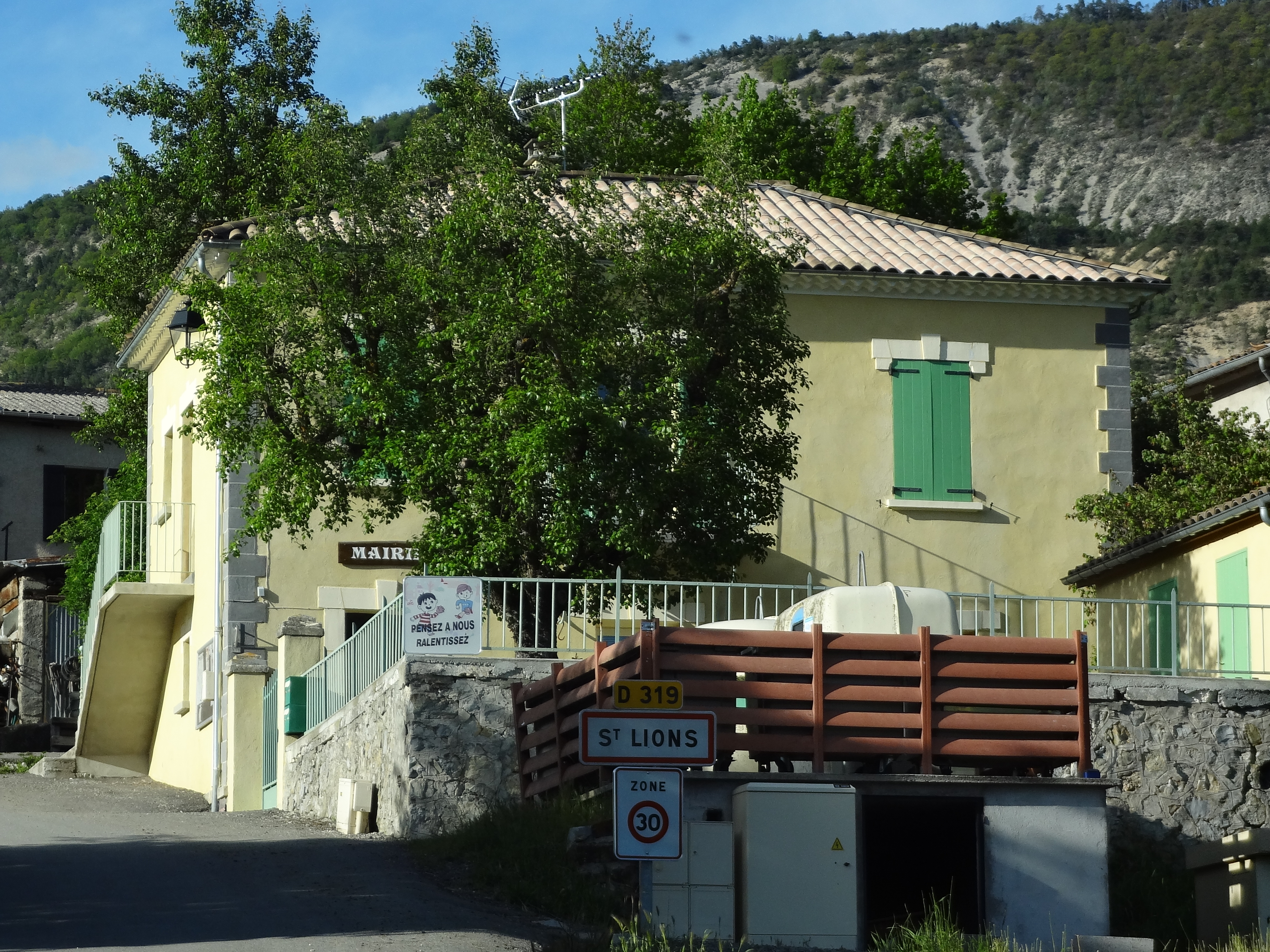
- The town hall in Saint-Lions
- Location of Saint-Lions
- Location within France Location within Provence-Alpes-Côte d'Azur
- Coordinates: 43°59′10″N 6°24′01″E
- Country: France
- Region: Provence-Alpes-Côte d'Azur
- Department: Alpes-de-Haute-Provence
- Arrondissement: Castellane
- Canton: Riez

Government
  - Mayor (2026–32): Julien Isnard
- Area^{1}: 11.55 km^{2} (4.46 sq mi)
- Elevation: 800 m (2,600 ft)
- Highest elevation: 1,589 m (5,213 ft)
- Lowest elevation: 739 m (2,425 ft)
- Population (2023): 38
  - Density: 3.3/km^{2} (8.5/sq mi)
- Time zone: UTC+01:00 (CET)
  - Summer (DST): UTC+02:00 (CEST)
- INSEE/Postal code: 04187 /04330
- ^{1} French Land Register data, which excludes lakes, ponds, glaciers > 1 km^{2} (0.386 sq mi or 247 acres) and river estuaries.

Saint-Lions is a commune in the Alpes-de-Haute-Provence department in southeastern France.

== Geography ==
The river Asse de Clumanc flows south through the western part of the commune.

== Population ==
Historical population
Year	Pop.	±% p.a.
1968	23	—
1975	20	−1.98%
1982	28	+4.92%
1990	50	+7.52%
1999	32	−4.84%
2007	41	+3.15%
2012	39	−1.00%
2017	49	+4.67%
2023	38	−4.15%
Source: INSEE

== See also ==
- Communes of the Alpes-de-Haute-Provence department
