= Châteauredon =

Châteauredon Castèuredon (Occitan)
- Commune
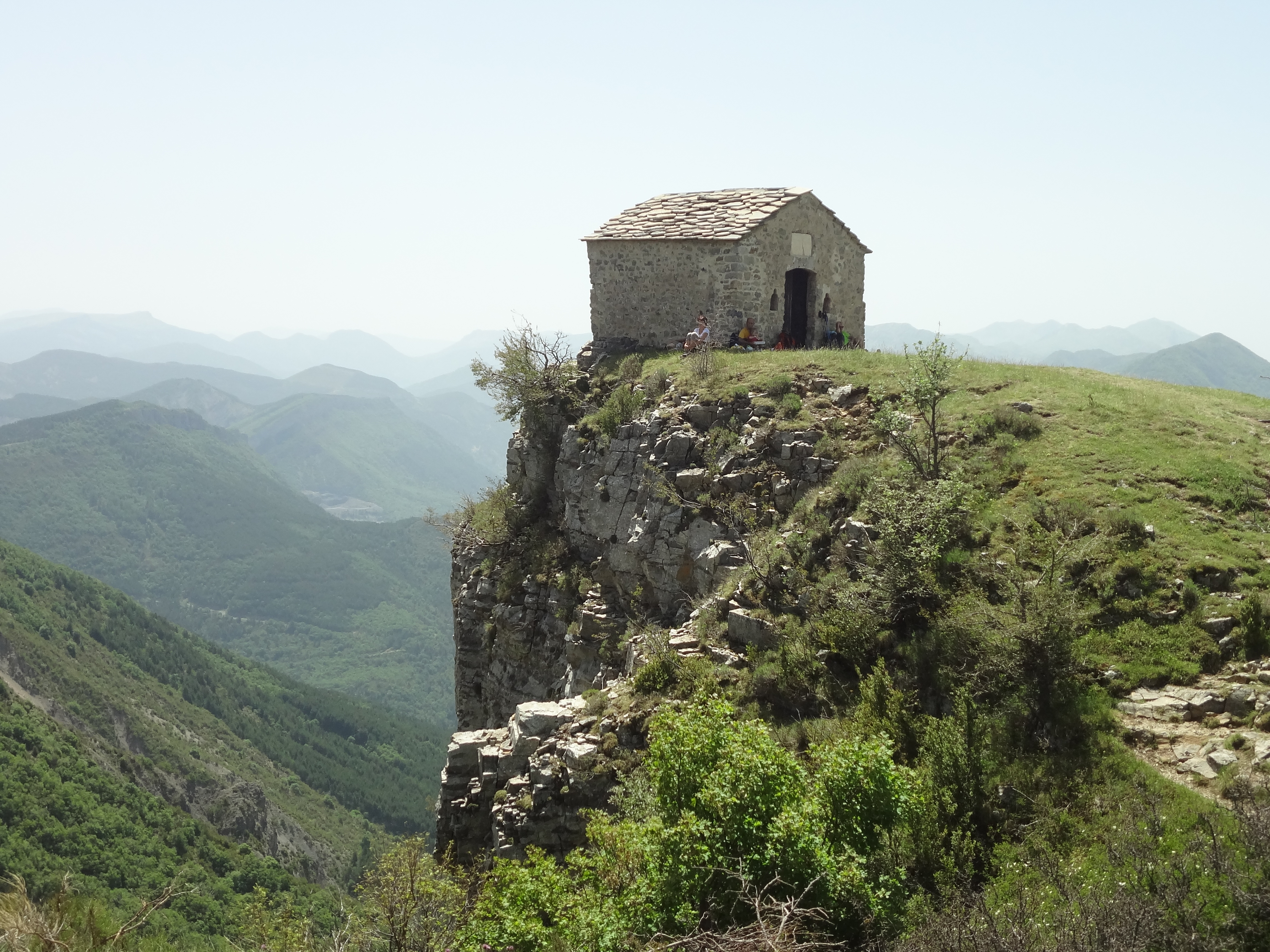
- The chapel of Saint-Michel of Cousson

- Coat of arms
- Location of Châteauredon
- Location within France Location within Provence-Alpes-Côte d'Azur
- Coordinates: 44°00′55″N 6°12′55″E
- Country: France
- Region: Provence-Alpes-Côte d'Azur
- Department: Alpes-de-Haute-Provence
- Arrondissement: Digne-les-Bains
- Canton: Riez
- Intercommunality: CA Provence-Alpes

Government
  - Mayor (2026–32): Brigitte Cochet
- Area^{1}: 10.53 km^{2} (4.07 sq mi)
- Elevation: 613 m (2,011 ft)
- Highest elevation: 1,511 m (4,957 ft)
- Lowest elevation: 573 m (1,880 ft)
- Population (2023): 76
  - Density: 7.2/km^{2} (19/sq mi)
- Time zone: UTC+01:00 (CET)
  - Summer (DST): UTC+02:00 (CEST)
- INSEE/Postal code: 04054 /04270
- ^{1} French Land Register data, which excludes lakes, ponds, glaciers > 1 km^{2} (0.386 sq mi or 247 acres) and river estuaries.

Châteauredon (French: [ʃɑtoʁədɔ̃]; Occitan: Castèuredon) is a commune in the Alpes-de-Haute-Provence department in southeastern France.

== Geography ==
The river Asse forms all of the commune's southeastern border.

== Population ==
Historical population
Year	Pop.	±% p.a.
1968	40	—
1975	40	+0.00%
1982	56	+4.92%
1990	67	+2.27%
1999	96	+4.08%
2007	97	+0.13%
2012	81	−3.54%
2017	73	−2.06%
2023	76	+0.67%
Source: INSEE

== See also ==
- Communes of the Alpes-de-Haute-Provence department
