= Musée de la Faïence =

Coordinates: 49.073°N 5.124°E

Musée de la Faïence is a museum in Rarécourt in the Meuse department of France.

The museum is in a 17th-century house. It contains, among other things, 800 pieces of Argon earthenware and pottery.

== See also ==
- List of museums in France
