= Le Castellet, Alpes-de-Haute-Provence =

Le Castellet Lo Castelet (Occitan)
- Commune
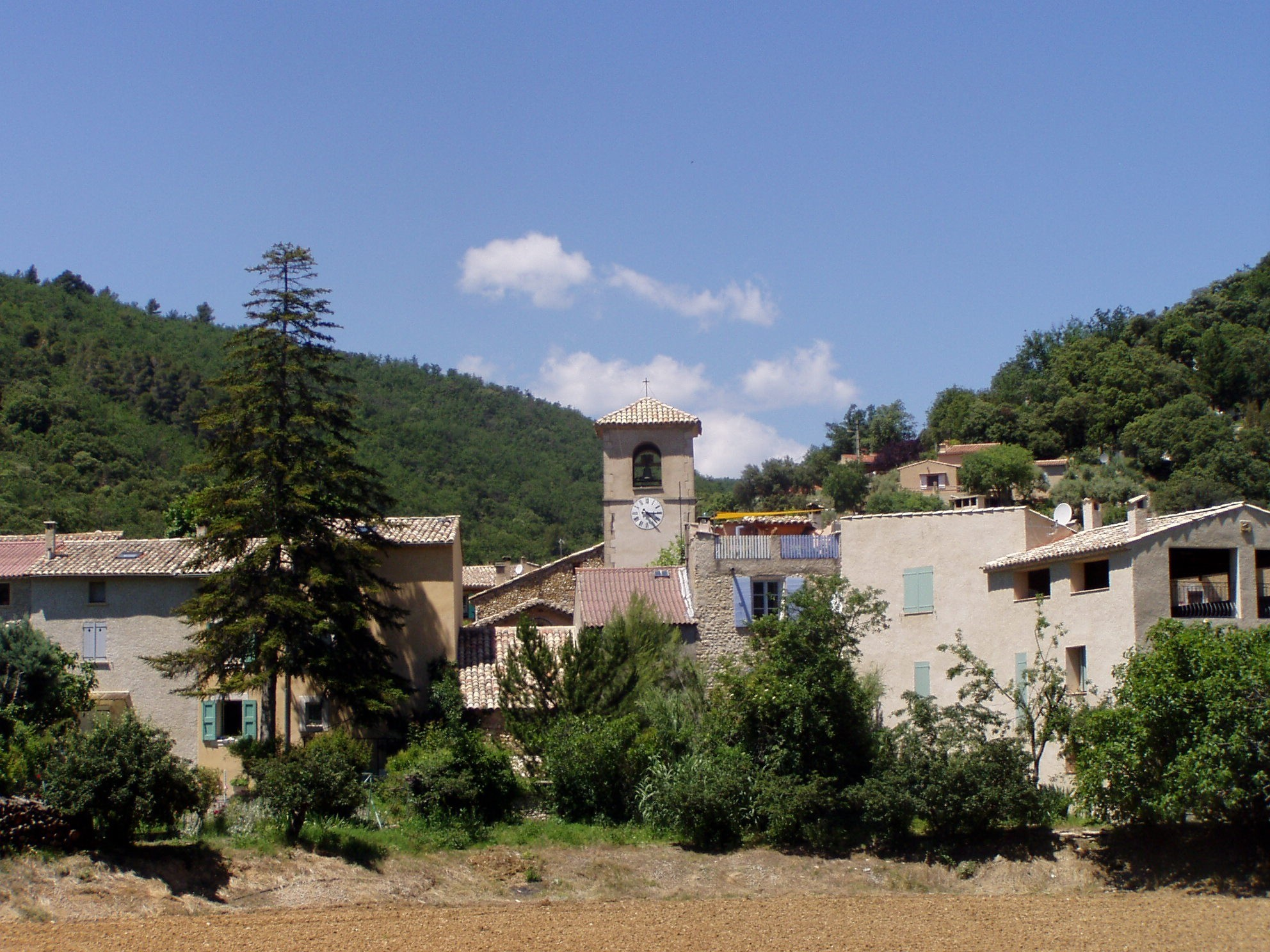
- The village of Le Castellet

- Coat of arms
- Location of Le Castellet
- Location within France Location within Provence-Alpes-Côte d'Azur
- Coordinates: 43°56′22″N 5°58′51″E
- Country: France
- Region: Provence-Alpes-Côte d'Azur
- Department: Alpes-de-Haute-Provence
- Arrondissement: Forcalquier
- Canton: Riez
- Intercommunality: Durance-Luberon-Verdon Agglomération

Government
  - Mayor (2026–32): Benoît Gouin
- Area^{1}: 18.87 km^{2} (7.29 sq mi)
- Elevation: 480 m (1,570 ft)
- Highest elevation: 665 m (2,182 ft)
- Lowest elevation: 362 m (1,188 ft)
- Population (2023): 296
  - Density: 15.7/km^{2} (40.6/sq mi)
- Demonym: Castellians
- Time zone: UTC+01:00 (CET)
  - Summer (DST): UTC+02:00 (CEST)
- INSEE/Postal code: 04041 /04700
- ^{1} French Land Register data, which excludes lakes, ponds, glaciers > 1 km^{2} (0.386 sq mi or 247 acres) and river estuaries.

Le Castellet (French pronunciation: [lə kastəlɛ]; Occitan: Lo Castelet) is a rural commune in the Alpes-de-Haute-Provence department in the Provence-Alpes-Côte d'Azur region in Southeastern France. It is located north of Valensole, east of the Valley of the Durance.

== Geography ==
The river Asse forms part of the commune's southern border.

== Demographics ==
Historical population
Year	Pop.	±% p.a.
1968	125	—
1975	151	+2.74%
1982	186	+3.02%
1990	172	−0.97%
1999	202	+1.80%
2007	244	+2.39%
2012	289	+3.44%
2017	293	+0.28%
2023	296	+0.17%
Source: INSEE

== See also ==
- Communes of the Alpes-de-Haute-Provence department
