= Mézel =

- Commune
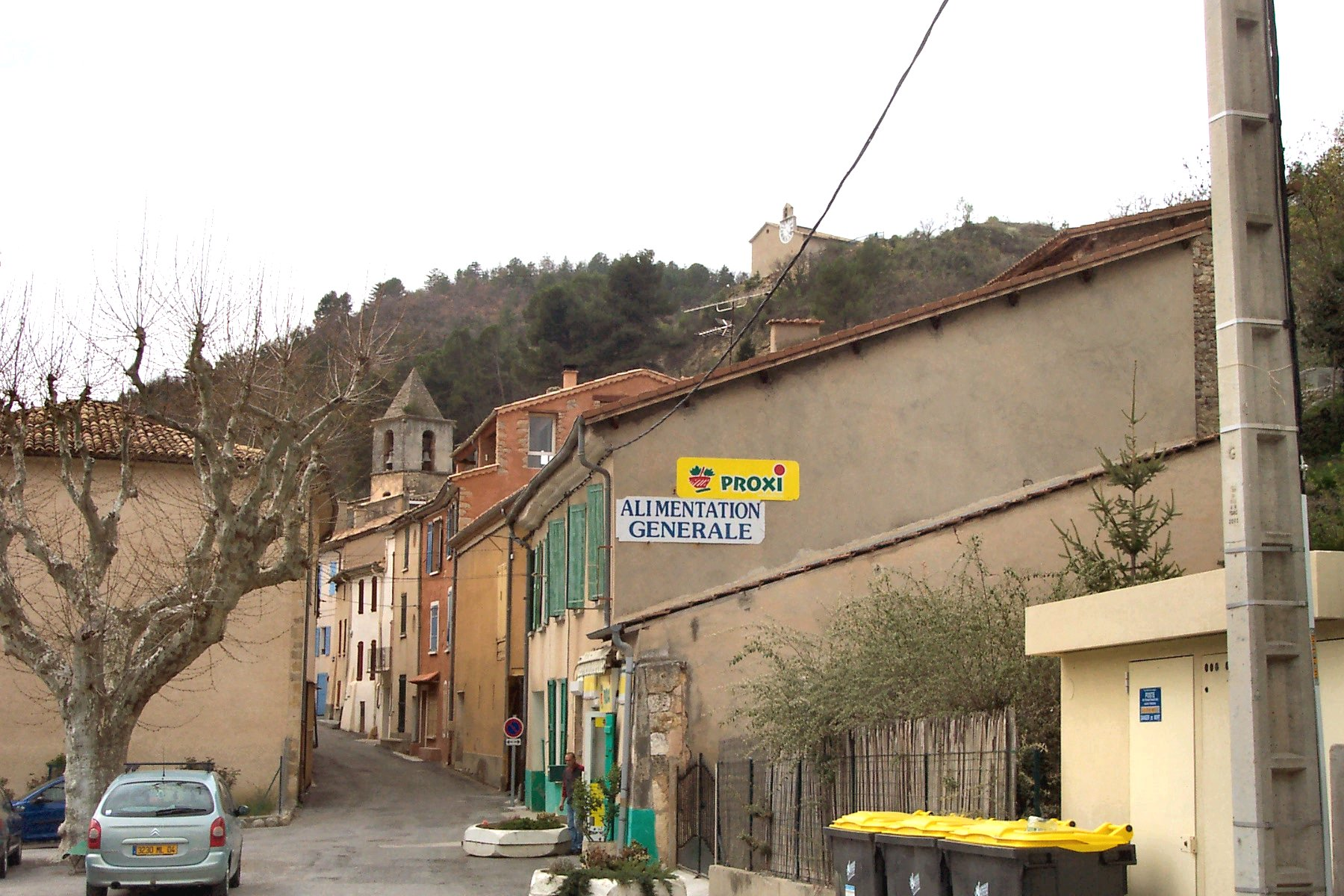
- The main road in the village of Mézel

- Coat of arms
- Location of Mézel
- Location within France Location within Provence-Alpes-Côte d'Azur
- Coordinates: 43°59′51″N 6°11′48″E
- Country: France
- Region: Provence-Alpes-Côte d'Azur
- Department: Alpes-de-Haute-Provence
- Arrondissement: Digne-les-Bains
- Canton: Riez
- Intercommunality: CA Provence-Alpes

Government
  - Mayor (2026–32): Gilles Bertorello
- Area^{1}: 21.36 km^{2} (8.25 sq mi)
- Highest elevation: 971 m (3,186 ft)
- Lowest elevation: 537 m (1,762 ft)
- Population (2023): 611
  - Density: 28.6/km^{2} (74.1/sq mi)
- Time zone: UTC+01:00 (CET)
  - Summer (DST): UTC+02:00 (CEST)
- INSEE/Postal code: 04121 /04270
- ^{1} French Land Register data, which excludes lakes, ponds, glaciers > 1 km^{2} (0.386 sq mi or 247 acres) and river estuaries.

Mézel (French pronunciation: [mezɛl]; Occitan: Mesèu) is a commune in the Alpes-de-Haute-Provence department in southeastern France.

== Geography ==
The village lies on the right bank of the Asse, which forms all of the communes eastern border.

== Population ==
Historical population
Year	Pop.	±% p.a.
1968	346	—
1975	326	−0.85%
1982	335	+0.39%
1990	423	+2.96%
1999	536	+2.67%
2007	638	+2.20%
2012	709	+2.13%
2017	656	−1.54%
2023	611	−1.18%
Source: INSEE

== See also ==
- Communes of the Alpes-de-Haute-Provence department
