= Beynes, Alpes-de-Haute-Provence =

Beynes
- Commune
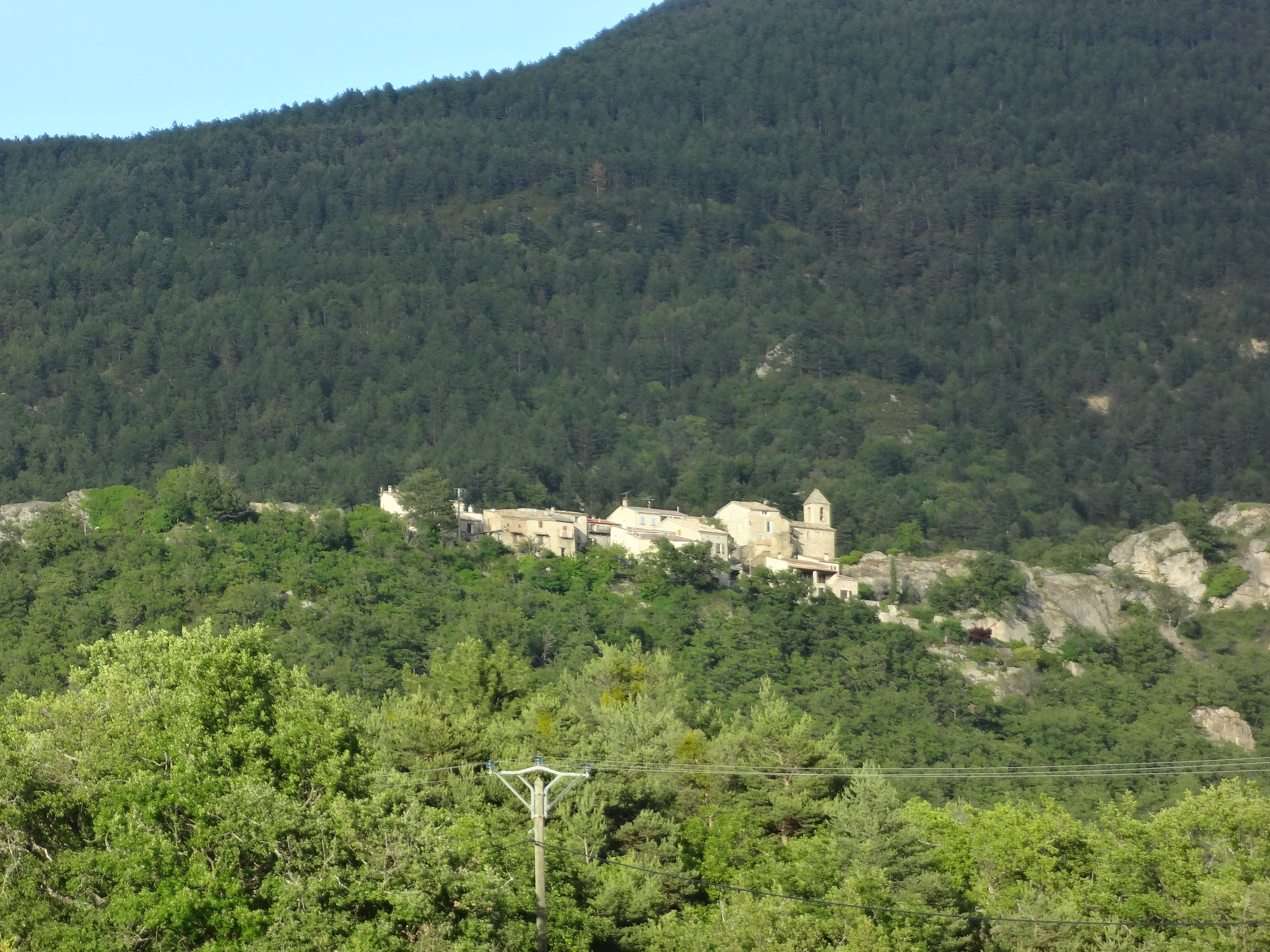
- The old village of Beynes

- Coat of arms
- Location of Beynes
- Location within France Location within Provence-Alpes-Côte d'Azur
- Coordinates: 43°59′30″N 6°13′27″E
- Country: France
- Region: Provence-Alpes-Côte d'Azur
- Department: Alpes-de-Haute-Provence
- Arrondissement: Digne-les-Bains
- Canton: Riez
- Intercommunality: CA Provence-Alpes

Government
  - Mayor (2026–32): Sylvain Flores
- Area^{1}: 41.24 km^{2} (15.92 sq mi)
- Elevation: 793 m (2,602 ft)
- Highest elevation: 1,601 m (5,253 ft)
- Lowest elevation: 537 m (1,762 ft)
- Population (2023): 120
  - Density: 2.9/km^{2} (7.5/sq mi)
- Time zone: UTC+01:00 (CET)
  - Summer (DST): UTC+02:00 (CEST)
- INSEE/Postal code: 04028 /04270
- ^{1} French Land Register data, which excludes lakes, ponds, glaciers > 1 km^{2} (0.386 sq mi or 247 acres) and river estuaries.

Beynes (French pronunciation: [bɛn]; Occitan: Beinas) is a commune in the Alpes-de-Haute-Provence department in southeastern France.

== Geography ==
The river Asse forms all of the commune's northern border.

== Population ==
Historical population
Year	Pop.	±% p.a.
1968	51	—
1975	54	+0.82%
1982	75	+4.80%
1990	93	+2.73%
1999	114	+2.29%
2007	121	+0.75%
2012	122	+0.16%
2017	125	+0.49%
2023	120	−0.68%
Source: INSEE

== See also ==
- Communes of the Alpes-de-Haute-Provence department
