= Canton of Volonne =

Coordinates: 44°06′42″N 6°00′54″E

Volonne
- Former canton
- Interactive map of Volonne
- Country: France
- Region: Provence-Alpes-Côte d'Azur
- Department: Alpes-de-Haute-Provence
- No. of communes: {{{nbcomm}}}
- Disbanded: 2015
- Area: 158.55 km^{2} (61.22 sq mi)
- Population (2012): 11,886
  - Density: 74.967/km^{2} (194.16/sq mi)

The canton of Volonne is a former administrative division in southeastern France. It was disbanded following the French canton reorganisation which came into effect in March 2015. It had 11,886 inhabitants (2012).

The canton comprised the following communes:

- Aubignosc
- Château-Arnoux-Saint-Auban
- Châteauneuf-Val-Saint-Donat
- L'Escale
- Montfort
- Peipin
- Salignac
- Sourribes
- Volonne

== Demographics ==
Historical population Canton of Volonne
Year	1962	1968	1975	1982	1990	1999
Pop.	8,109	9,278	9,636	9,578	10,111	10,397
±%	—	+14.4%	+3.9%	−0.6%	+5.6%	+2.8%
From the year 1962 on: No double counting – residents of multiple communes (e.g. students and military personnel) are counted only once. Source: INSEE

== See also ==
- Cantons of the Alpes-de-Haute-Provence department
