= Aubignosc =

- Commune
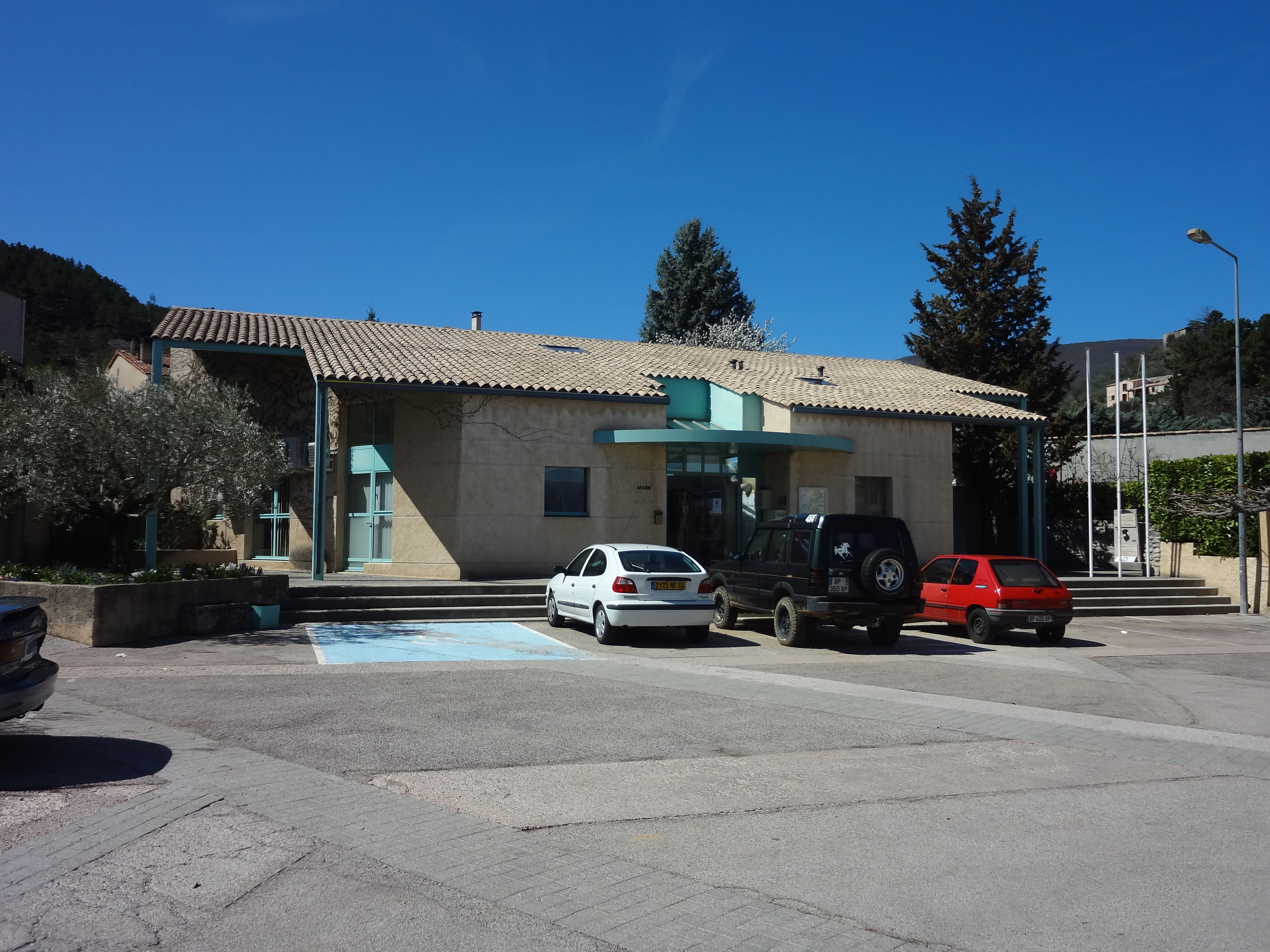
- The Town Hall

- Coat of arms
- Location of Aubignosc
- Location within France Location within Provence-Alpes-Côte d'Azur
- Coordinates: 44°07′50″N 5°58′11″E
- Country: France
- Region: Provence-Alpes-Côte d'Azur
- Department: Alpes-de-Haute-Provence
- Arrondissement: Forcalquier
- Canton: Château-Arnoux-Saint-Auban
- Intercommunality: Jabron Lure Vançon Durance

Government
  - Mayor (2026–32): René Avinens
- Area^{1}: 14.74 km^{2} (5.69 sq mi)
- Elevation: 460 m (1,510 ft)
- Highest elevation: 1,330 m (4,360 ft)
- Lowest elevation: 432 m (1,417 ft)
- Population (2023): 616
  - Density: 41.8/km^{2} (108/sq mi)
- Time zone: UTC+01:00 (CET)
  - Summer (DST): UTC+02:00 (CEST)
- INSEE/Postal code: 04013 /04200
- ^{1} French Land Register data, which excludes lakes, ponds, glaciers > 1 km^{2} (0.386 sq mi or 247 acres) and river estuaries.

Aubignosc (French pronunciation: [obiɡnɔsk]; Occitan: Aubinhòsc) is a commune in the Alpes-de-Haute-Provence department in the Provence-Alpes-Côte d'Azur region of south-eastern France.

== Geography ==
Aubignosc is located in the west of the Durance valley some 8 km south by south-east of Sisteron, 21 km west of Digne-les-Bains and 36 km north by north-east of Manosque. Apart from the village there are the hamlets of Les Jardins and Le Forest.

=== Topography ===
The village is located at 460 metres above sea level on the eastern slope of the valley of the Durance. The land is on the border of the Pre-Alps of Digne to the east and the Baronnies to the west. The altitude varies from 432 metres to 1,330 metres (east of the Lure mountain whose summit is at 1,826 metres between Cruis and Noyers-sur-Jabron. It once corresponded to a linguistic border between two varieties of Occitan). South of the village is hilly terrain with carved valleys and gullies over 600 metres deep. There are the Redonnette Ravine, the Maurieu Ravine, the Côtes chaudes Ravine, the Trou de Loupe Ravine, and the valley of the Grand Champ successively from north to south along the hills.

=== Environment ===
The town has 734 hectares of woods and forests.

=== Transport ===
The commune lies between Forcalquier (south-west), Digne-les-Bains to the east and Gap farther north. Access to the commune is by the A51 autoroute from La Brillanne in the south passing through the east of the commune with Exit 21 in the commune and continuing north. Route nationale N85 comes from Malijai in the south and joins the A51 in the commune. The D4085 comes from Sisteron in the north and joins the N85 in the commune. The D951 comes from Peipin in the north and passes south through the west of the commune and continues to Mallefougasse-Augès in the south-west. Access to the village is by the D503 which branches off the D4085 in the commune and goes south-west to join the D951 in the commune.

The nearest railway station served by the TER (Marseille - Briancon) is located in Sisteron as well as a bus station. Buses provide connections to the Digne-les-Bains - Château-Arnoux - Veynes service as well as the Digne - Avignon service.

The aerodrome of Sisteron-Theze is located twenty kilometres to the north at Vaumeilh.

There is a short hiking trail (equestrian route) passing through the commune from north to south.

=== Hydrology ===
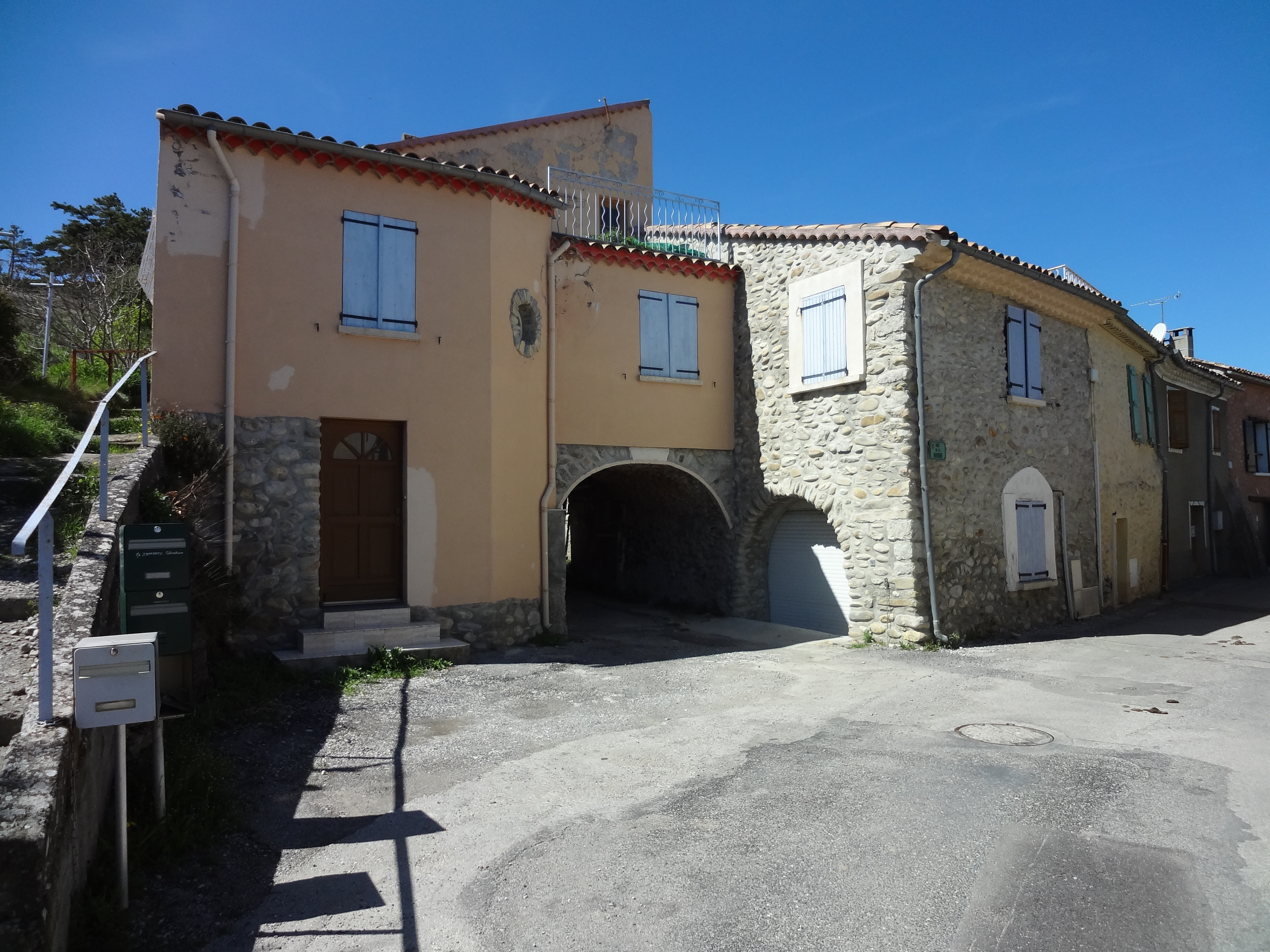
An old house which has been renovated. The walls are made of pebbles.

The entire eastern border of the commune is formed by the Durance as it flows south to eventually join the Rhône at Avignon. The Durance is both an Alpine and Mediterranean river with very specific morphology. It is called "capricious" and was once feared for its Flash floods (it was called the 3rd scourge of Provence) as well as for its low flow. Several intermittent streams trickle down the slopes and the Faillée gorge (east of the Lure mountain), and through the Prieuré forest. They flow into the Riou stream which flows north or to the Ravine de Maurieu, both tributaries of the Durance.

=== Geology ===
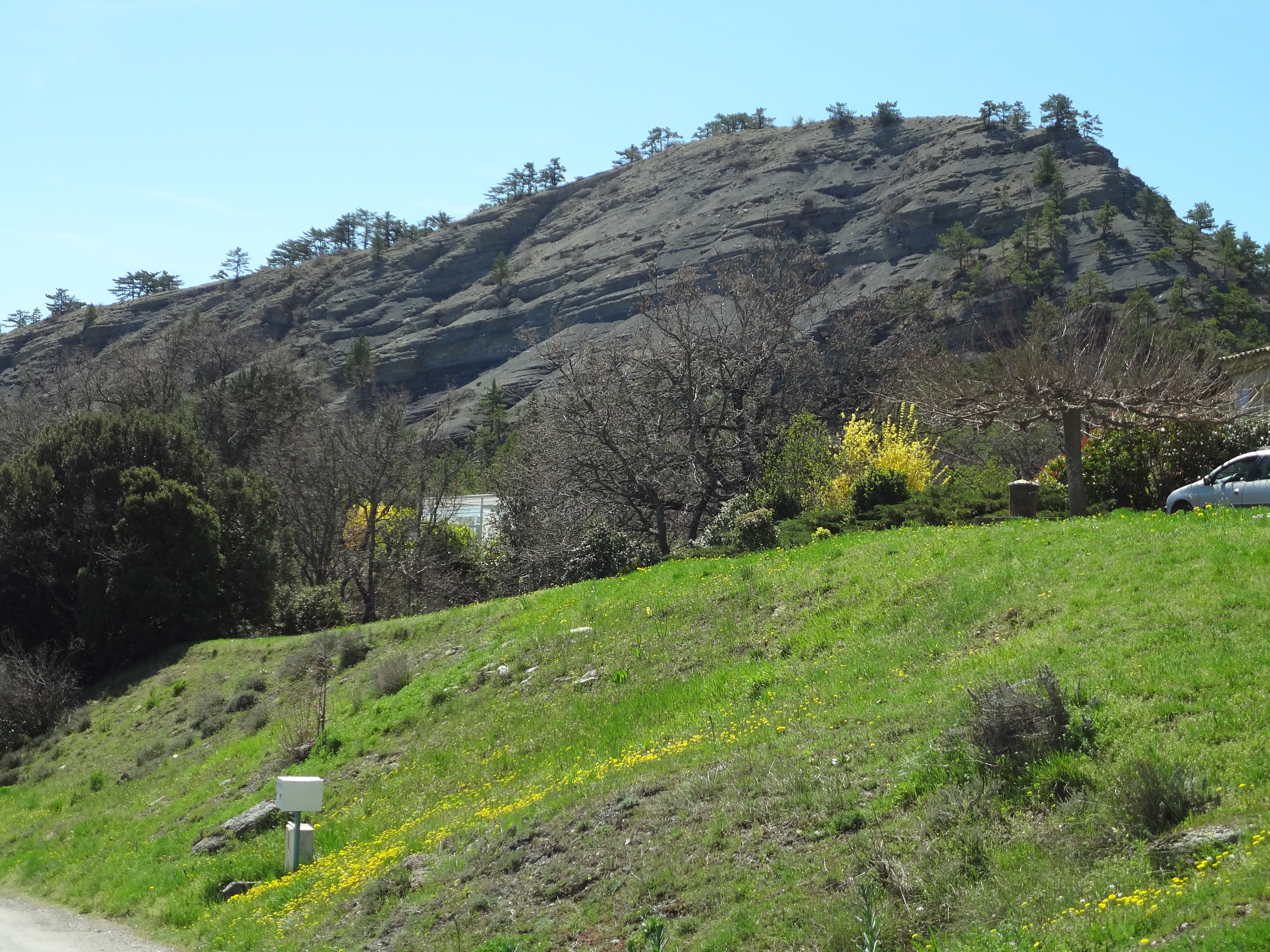
A hill formed of alternate bands of limestone and clay

Related article: Geology of the Alps.

The commune lies on the eastern edge of Lure mountain with Provençal limestone formations of the Upper Jurassic and Lower Cretaceous periods (sedimentary rocks from a former Alpine Ocean), between several major geological formations of the Alps:

- the Lure secondary mountains which are marked by numerous faults oriented north-west to south-east;
- the Durance fault to the south-east in the valley.

=== Natural and technological hazards ===
None of the 200 communes of the department are in a no seismic risk zone. The Canton of Volonne to which Aubignosc belongs is zone 1b (low risk) according to the deterministic classification of 1991 which is based on historical seismic activity, and zone 4 (medium risk) according to probabilistic classification EC8 of 2011. Farther south, along the Durance fault, the cantons of Peyruis, Les Mees, Manosque-Nord, Manosque-Sud-Est, Manosque-Sud-Ouest, and Valensole are in Zone 2 (medium risk).

Aubignosc commune is also exposed to three other natural hazards:

- forest fire,
- flood (in the valley of the Bléone),
- landslide: the commune has a high risk in a substantial part of its territory.

Aubignosc is also exposed to technological risks:

- risk of dam failure (the valley of the Durance would be submerged in case of failure of the Serre-Ponçon dam);
- risk of transporting hazardous materials by rail, road, and pipeline. This is from the transport of primary materials to its destination or finished products from the Arkema factory at Saint-Auban. These products are likely to be carried on the A51 autoroute, Route nationale N85, or the Lyon-Marseille via Grenoble railway. Finally the Transalpes and Transéthylène pipelines are used to carry ethylene through the commune.

The Risk prevention plan for foreseeable natural risks (PPR) does not exist for the commune. A DICRIM does not exist.

The town has been the victim of several natural disasters of floods and mudslides in 1994 and 1998. The earthquake that was felt the most in Aubignosc was the Lambesc earthquake on 11 June 1909

== Toponymy ==
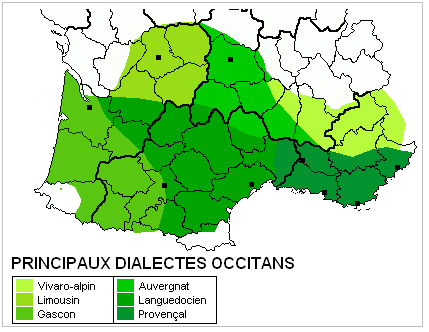
Lure mountain: the linguistic border between Provençal and Vivaro-alpine

The commune is called Aubinhòsc in classical Provençal and Lou Bignosc in Provençal of the Mistralian norm. The locality appears for the first time in texts from 1040 as de Albinosco. The name is derived from the Roman Gens Albinus with the suffix -osc and became Bignosc in the 16th century.

The toponymy of the commune is influenced by the mountainous character of the region, the Mediterranean climate, and the Occitan culture. The Chemin des Côtes (Path of the hills) which passes over the crest of the Lure, bordering Peipin, is also a path which is used to climb the peaks. Its neighbour, the Chemin de Plaine Longue (Path of the long plain) leads to the high plateau. There is also the Côtes Chaudes (Hot hills), near the Ponchonnière (pointed summit). The Pas des Bœufs indicates a way of passage or a pass in Occitan dialect.

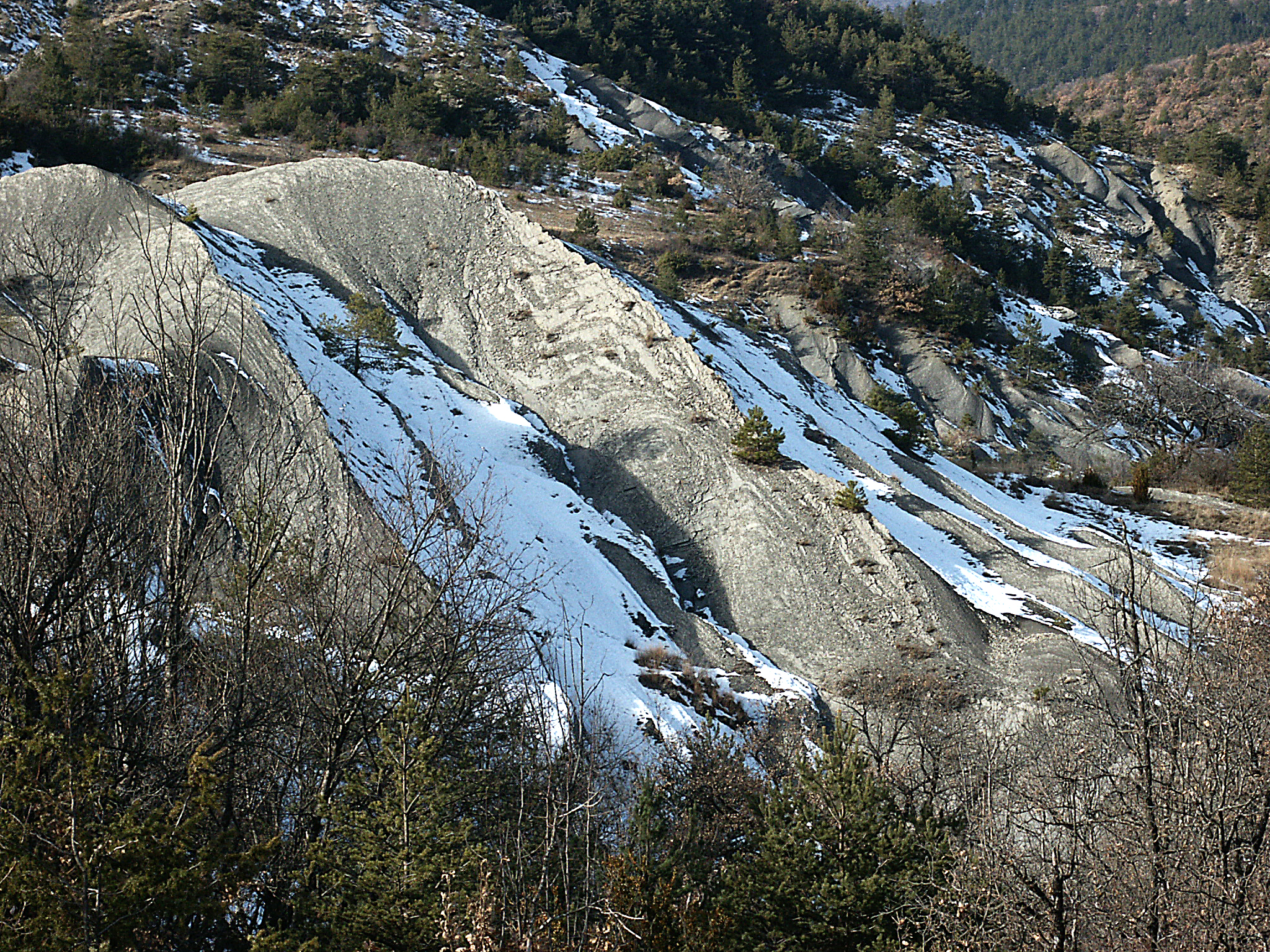
An example of Robines in the Alps

Erosion, aggravated by deforestation, washes pebbles from the mountains that accumulate at the bottom of slopes: this kind of area is called Gravas (near Forest); the Roubines refer to black marl or clay - i.e. robines in French.

The Ravines de la Romigière and of Buis are named after the vegetation: in Occitan romigière is a place where brambles grow.

Human occupation and land use have resulted in several specific names: there are several places called Grand-Champ; Condamine is manorial land, indivisible and exempt from taxation; Forest is a hamlet - not in a forest but an isolated village. Finally, sheepfarming with the Occitan Jas (sheep pen) has provided several names: Jas de Mathieu in Lure, Les Jas, and the hamlet of Jas in the Forest vale.

== History ==
=== Prehistory ===
During the construction of the A51 autoroute a prehistoric site was excavated at Ponchonnières which was occupied by the Chasséen, then the Neolithic, and finally the Chalcolithic peoples around 3000 B.C. The site was occupied by agro-pastoralists who built huts of about 20 m~~2~~ with the top being 4 or 5 m high. Their herds consisted mainly of small ruminants (70-80%) and cattle (about 20%). The consumption of meat from the herd was supplemented by the collection of molluscs (snails but also 18 other species). Anthracological studies have shown that the wood used for fires was oak (green or pubescent) which shows that the forest was still quite widely present at this time.

=== Gallic and Roman period ===
During Antiquity the territory of Aubignosc belonged to the Sogiontii whose territory extended from south of the Baronnies to the Durance. The Sogiontiques were federated with the Vocontii and, after the Roman conquest, they were attached with them to the Roman province of Gallia Narbonensis. In the 2nd century they are detached from Voconces and form a distinct civitas with its capital at Segustero (Sisteron). An ancient tomb was found in the commune in 1962.

The A51 works also identified Gallo-Roman buildings. These facilities, located at Présidentes, corresponded to a village or a small town. The inhabitants lived on agriculture while there was a large area where a libertus (freedman), Gaius Iulius Thallus, lived on the site of the current village. Thallus, a Roman citizen, is the oldest known inhabitant of Aubignosc. The quality of the construction of the village at Présidentes is fairly average: the walls are made of pebbles and the mortar is simple lime.

The Romans built a temple to Sylvanus whose altar was reused in the church as the base of the font.

=== Middle Ages ===
While the south-east of Gaul was Burgundian land, the king of the Ostrogoths, Theodoric the Great, conquered the region between the Durance, the Rhône, and Isère in 510. The commune depended briefly on Italy until 526. In order to reconcile with the Burgundian king Godomar III, the Ostrogothic regent Amalasontha gave him the territory.

In the Middle Ages the Aubignosc community was part of the viguerie of Sisteron and the Abbey of Cruis owned a priory. The Aubignosc community had the privilege of not paying queste (similar to Taille) to the Counts of Provence (and their successors, the kings of France) until the French Revolution.

=== Contemporary period ===
Following a dispute between the priest and his parishioners, a large part of the community embraced Protestant worship en masse.

After the French coup of 1851 of 2 December by Louis-Napoleon Bonaparte, the areas around Sisteron, Forcalquier, and Manosque developed a resistance movement to defend the Republic: 15,000 armed men were mobilized. The Resistance took control of the prefecture at Digne and formed a "Departmental Committee of resistance". The army, who rallied to Napoleon III, overcame this movement. After the failure of the insurrection severe repression continued for those who stood to defend the Republic: 8 inhabitants of Aubignosc were brought before the Joint Commission, the most common punishment being deportation to Algeria.

As with many communes in the department Aubignosc had schools well before the Jules Ferry laws: in 1863 it had two - installed in the main village and also in Forest - which provided primary education for boys. No instruction was given to girls: neither the Falloux Act (1851), which required the opening of a girls' school in communes with more than 800 inhabitants nor the first Duruy Law (1867), which lowers the threshold to 500 inhabitants, affected Aubignosc. The town benefited from subsidies from the second Duruy law (1877) to construct new schools to replace the old but it was not until the Ferry laws that girls from the commune had regular schooling.

In many communes the department has had a significant rural exodus from the 1850s. The commune lost half of its population in a little over a hundred years.

The region was also affected by regional or national fatal episodes: epidemics of cholera and the world wars (men died at the front during the First World War). During the Second World War the department was occupied by Italy in 1942-1943 then by Nazi Germany until August 1944. At that time the nearby town of Sisteron was bombed by the Allies as part of the Provence landings. The commune and Digne were liberated on 19 August 1944.

Until the middle of the 20th century, vines were cultivated in Aubignosc. The wine product, however, was of poor quality and was for home consumption with a portion of the production attributable to owners from Sisteron. This culture is now abandoned.

=== Heraldry ===
Arms of Aubignosc	These Arms are used on signs for streets and places in the commune. Blazon: Gules, a tower with a spire all of Or, masoned, ported, and windowed of Sable.

== Politics and Administration ==
=== Municipal administration ===
According to its size, the commune has a municipal council of 15 members (Article L2121-2 of the General Code of local authorities). During the 2014 elections there was only one round and René Avinens was elected councillor with 258 votes, or 94.5% of the vote. The turnout was 68.76%. He was then appointed mayor by the council.

=== Mayors ===
The election of mayors was a major innovation from the French Revolution of 1789. From 1790 to 1795 mayors were elected by suffrage for a 2-year term. From 1795 to 1800, there were no mayors - the commune simply designated a municipal agent who was delegated to the Municipality of the Canton.

In 1799-1800, the Consulate revisited the election of mayors who were now appointed by the central government. This system is maintained in subsequent governments with the exception of the Second Republic (1848-1851). After retaining the authoritarian system, the Third Republic liberalized it with the law of 5 April 1884 administration of Commons: the council, elected by universal suffrage, elects the mayor from among its members.

List of Successive Mayors

Mayors from the French Revolution to 1930

From	To	Name	Party	Position
1793	1796	Jean-Antoine Maurel		
1798	1800	Joseph Pulvérail		
1800	1803	Jean-Michel Amayenc		
1806	1812	François Mathieu Féraud		
1813	1815	Pierre Joseph Bonnet		
1816	1821	Jean-Pierre Fabre		
1821	1825	Pierre, François Mathieu Féraud		
1826	1831	Jacques Pierre Dominique Corbon		
1832	1834	Jean-Pierre Fabre		
1835	1840	Pierre Maurel		
1841	1848	Jean-Louis Gallissian		
1849	1850	Joseph Mathieu Roubaud		
1850	1852	Jean-Pierre Amayenc		
1853	1854	Jean-Baptiste Benoît		
1855	1859	Pierre Maurel		
1860	1871	Alfred Corbon		
1871	1873	Joseph Pulvérail		
1874	1876	Alfred Corbon		
1876	1877	Jacques Joseph Pulvérail		
1877	1878	Antoine Féraud		
1878	1880	Joseph Péllissier		
1880	1884	Fortuné Fabre		
1885	1904	Aimé Magnan		
1904	1908	Frédéric Adrien Bérenguier		
1909	1910	Fortuné Fabre		
1910	1919	Lucien Laurent		
1920	1929	Henri Pulvérail		

Mayors from 1930

From	To	Name	Party	Position
1930	1958	Élie Magnan		
1958	1972	Arthur Silve		
1973	1983	Emile Arbouet		
1983	2008	Vincent Ponce	UMP	
2008	Current	René Avinens	DVD	

War memorials in the commune

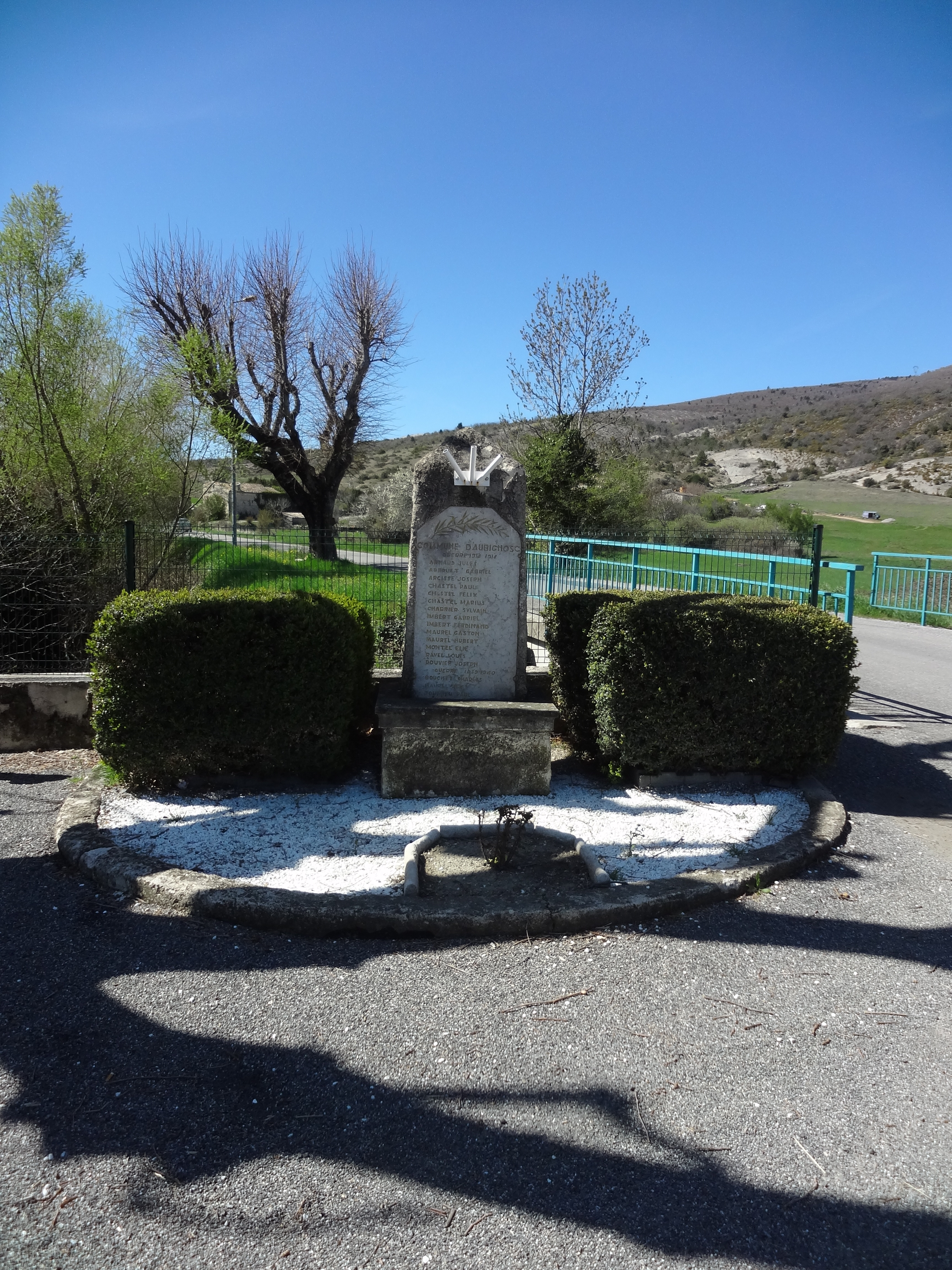
Monument to the two world wars at Forest.

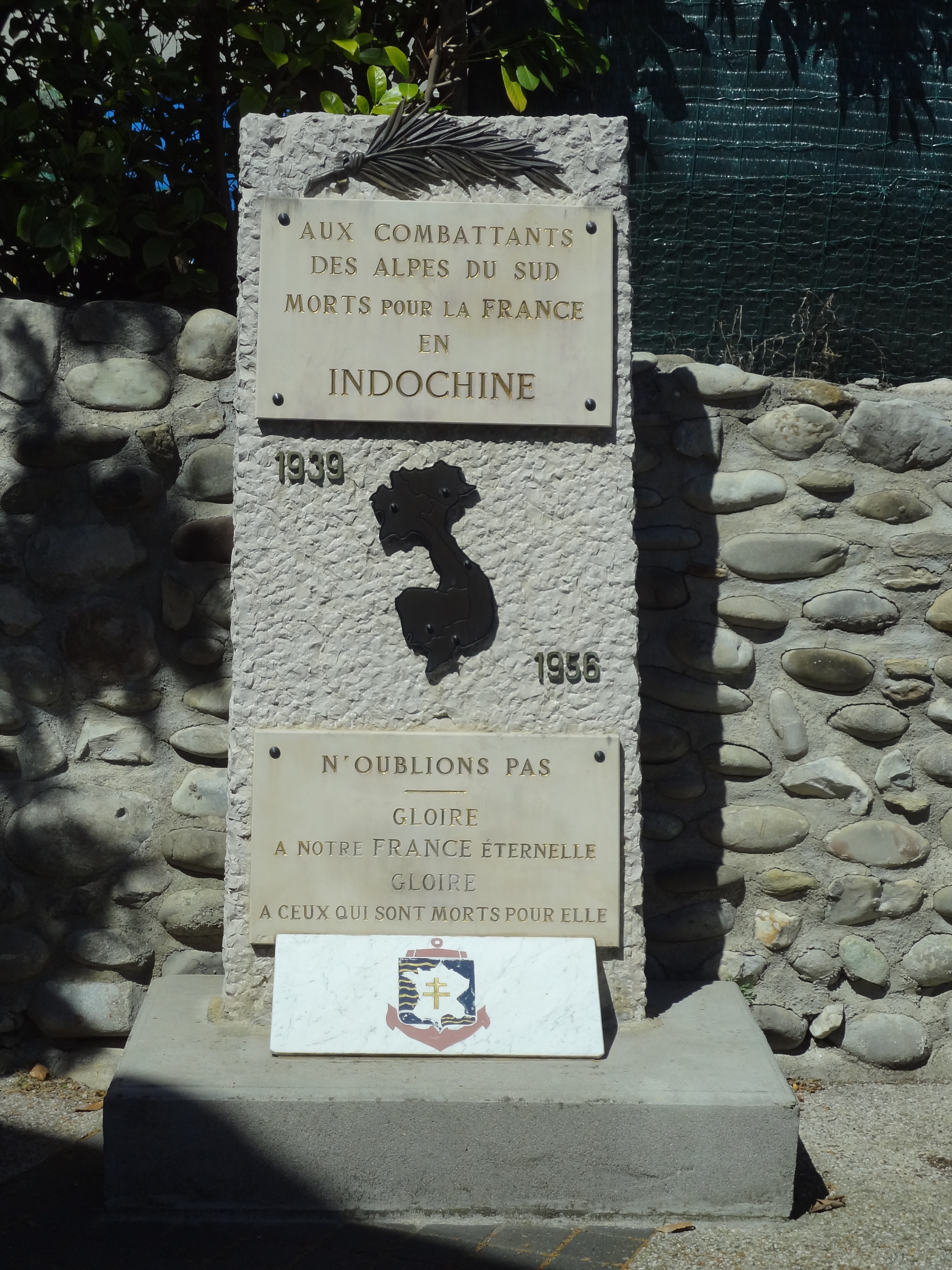
War Memorial for the First Indochina War (at the town hall).

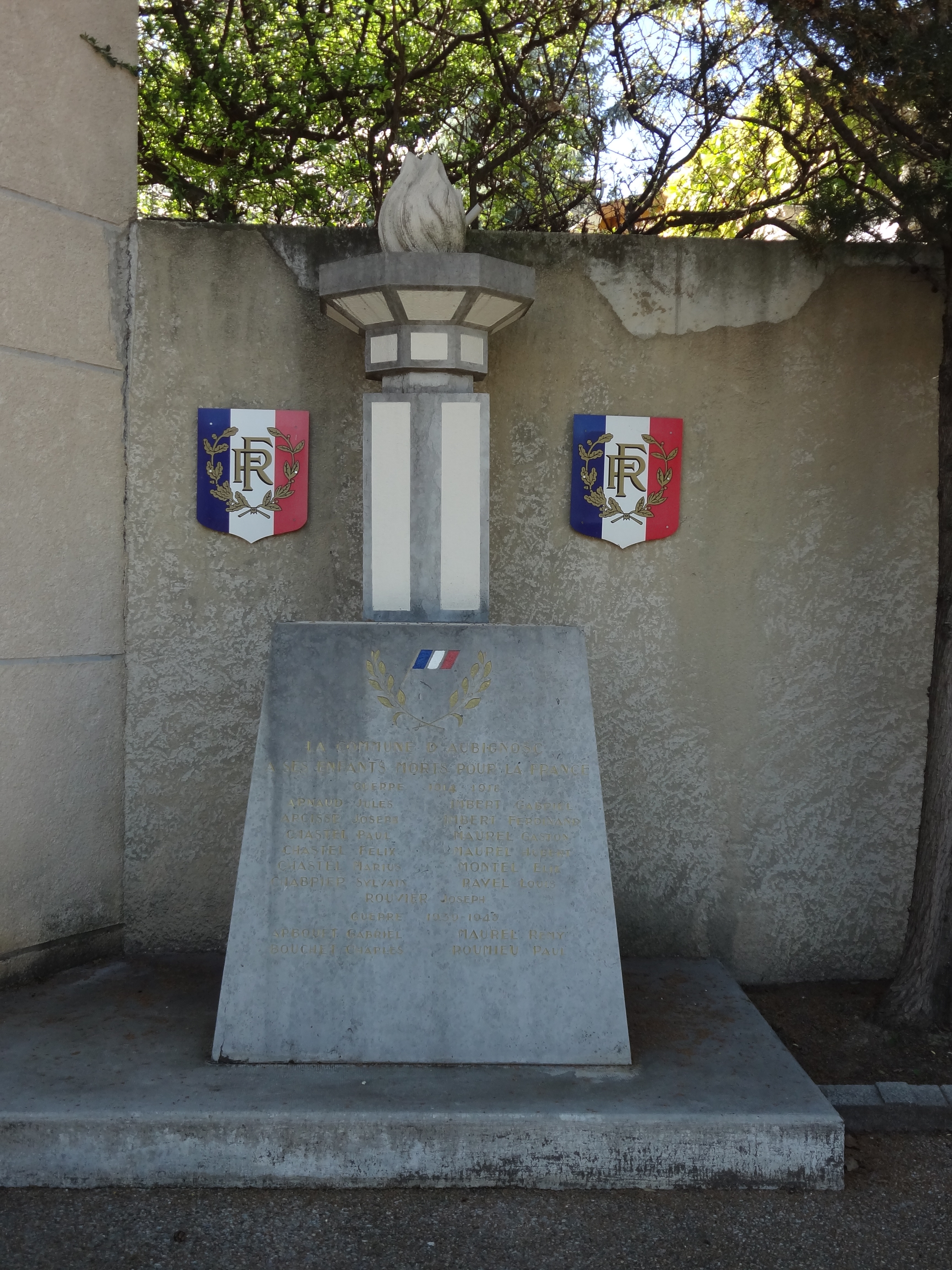
War memorial for the two world wars.

=== Administrative and legal bodies ===
Aubignosc was part of the Arrondissement of Sisteron from 17 February 1800 to 10 September 1926 when it was incorporated into the Arrondissement of Forcalquier and the second constituency of Alpes-de-Haute-Provence. Aubignosc has been part of the Canton of Volonne since 1793, and became part of the new canton of Château-Arnoux-Saint-Auban in 2015. Aubignosc is under the jurisdiction of the Tribunal d'instance of Forcalquier, the Industrial Tribunal of Manosque, and the High Court of Digne-les-Bains.

=== Tax system ===
The taxation of households and businesses in Aubignosc in 2009
Tax	Communal part	Inter-communal part	Departmental part	Regional part
Housing Tax (TH)	1.27%	0.00%	5.53%	0.00%
Property Tax on buildings (TFPB)	15.39%	0.00%	14.49%	2.36%
Property tax on vacant land (TFPNB)	46.49%	0.00%	47.16%	8.85%
Business Tax (TP)	0.00%	13.26%	10.80%	3.84%

The regional part of tax is not applicable for Aubignosc.

Business Tax (TP) was replaced in 2010 by the Enterprise property contribution (CFE) based on the rental value of property and the value-added contribution of the business sector (CVAE) (the two forming the Territorial Economic Contribution (CET) which is a Local Tax introduced by the Finance Act of 2010

== Population ==
The inhabitants of the commune are known as Aubignoscais or Aubignoscaises in French.

Historical population
Year	Pop.	±% p.a.
1968	192	—
1975	262	+4.54%
1982	286	+1.26%
1990	403	+4.38%
1999	428	+0.67%
2007	556	+3.32%
2012	556	+0.00%
2017	592	+1.26%
2023	616	+0.66%
Source: INSEE

== Economy ==
=== Overview ===
In 2017, the active population amounted to 299 people, including 35 unemployed (12%). These workers are in majority employees (84%), and are in majority employed outside the commune (84%).

Most of the jobs in the commune (79%) are in services and administration and the construction sector accounts for 11% of employment.

At the end of 2015 the active establishments in the commune were mainly shops and services (31 out of 65 establishments) and companies in the construction sector (13 out of 65).

There is an Equestrian centre and some local tourism with associated businesses such as La Magnanerie restaurant.

=== Agriculture ===
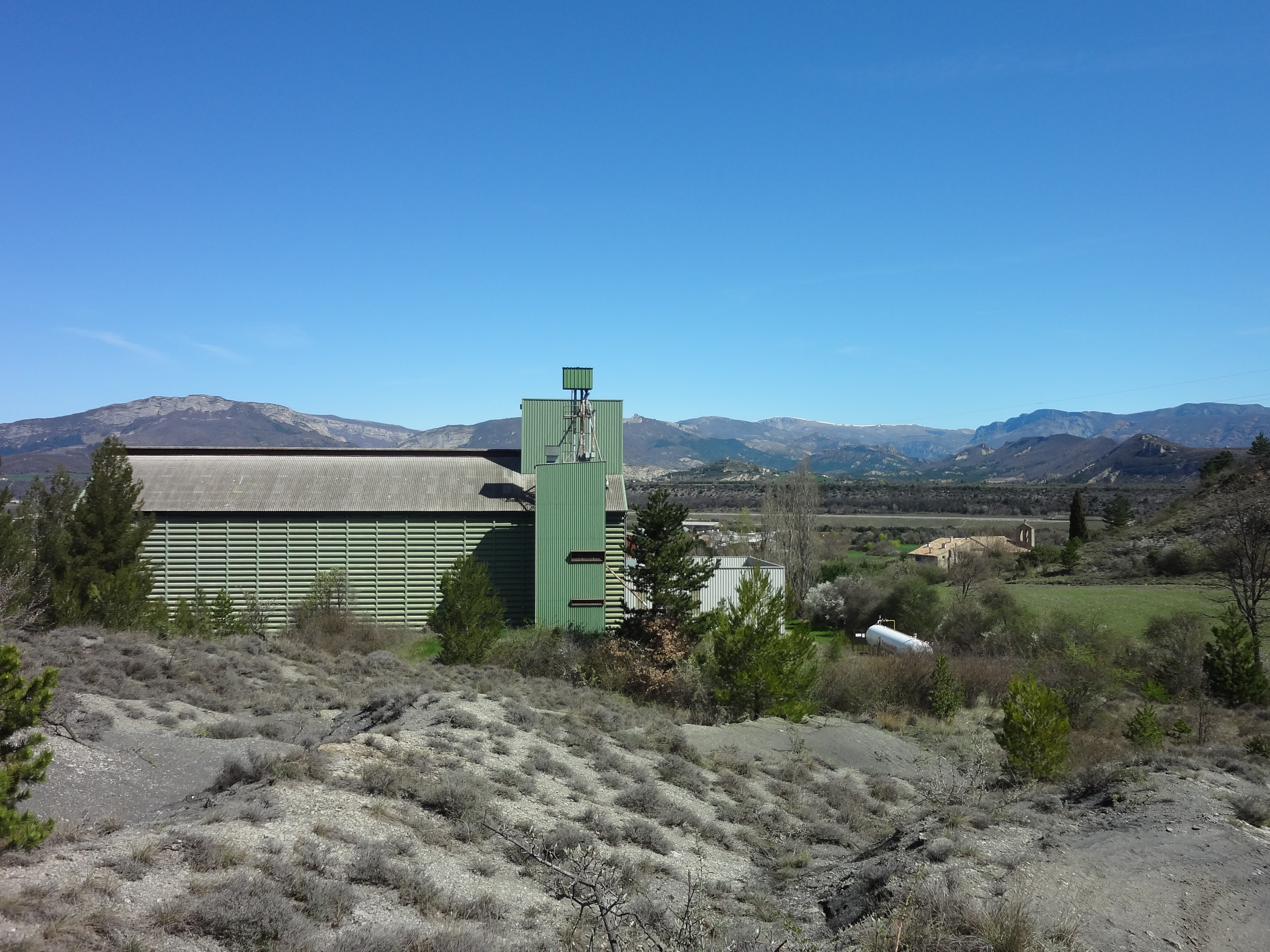
Cooperative building

There is an important agricultural cooperative in the commune.

At the end of 2015 the primary sector (agriculture, forestry, fisheries) had 9 establishments.

The number of farms, according to the Agreste Department of Agriculture survey, remained stable in the 2000s with 7 professional farms and 3 polyculture farms. Conversely the utilized agricultural area (UAA) has declined sharply in the same period, from 1,051 to 483 hectares, a figure that is higher than that of 1988 when the utilized agricultural area was only 314 hectares.

=== Labels ===
Aubignosc is included in the area for four Appellation d'origine contrôlée (AOC) labels (including Lavender oil of Haute-Provence and Banon cheese) and nine Protected Geographical Indication (IGP) labels (including Apples of Alpes de Haute-Durance, Honey of Provence, Lamb of Sisteron).

The culture of the olive has been practiced in the commune for centuries although limited to small areas. The terrain of the commune is at the altitudinal limit for the olive tree which can hardly be grown above 650 metres. Currently olives cover 22 hectares of the commune with 1,600 trees. The oil produced from olives harvested in the commune use the AOC labels Huile d'olive de Provence and Huile d'olive de Haute-Provence.

From the labels covering the commune, those for wine (VDP of Alpes-de-Haute-Provence white, red and rosé; VDP of Méditerranée, white, red and rosé) are not used as the vines are not cultivated for commercial production in the commune.

Agricultural production in Aubignosc

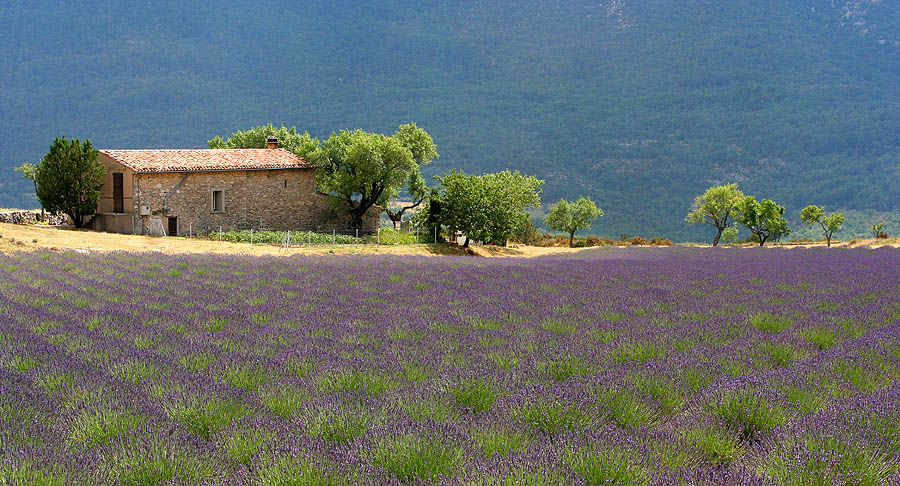
Field of Lavender

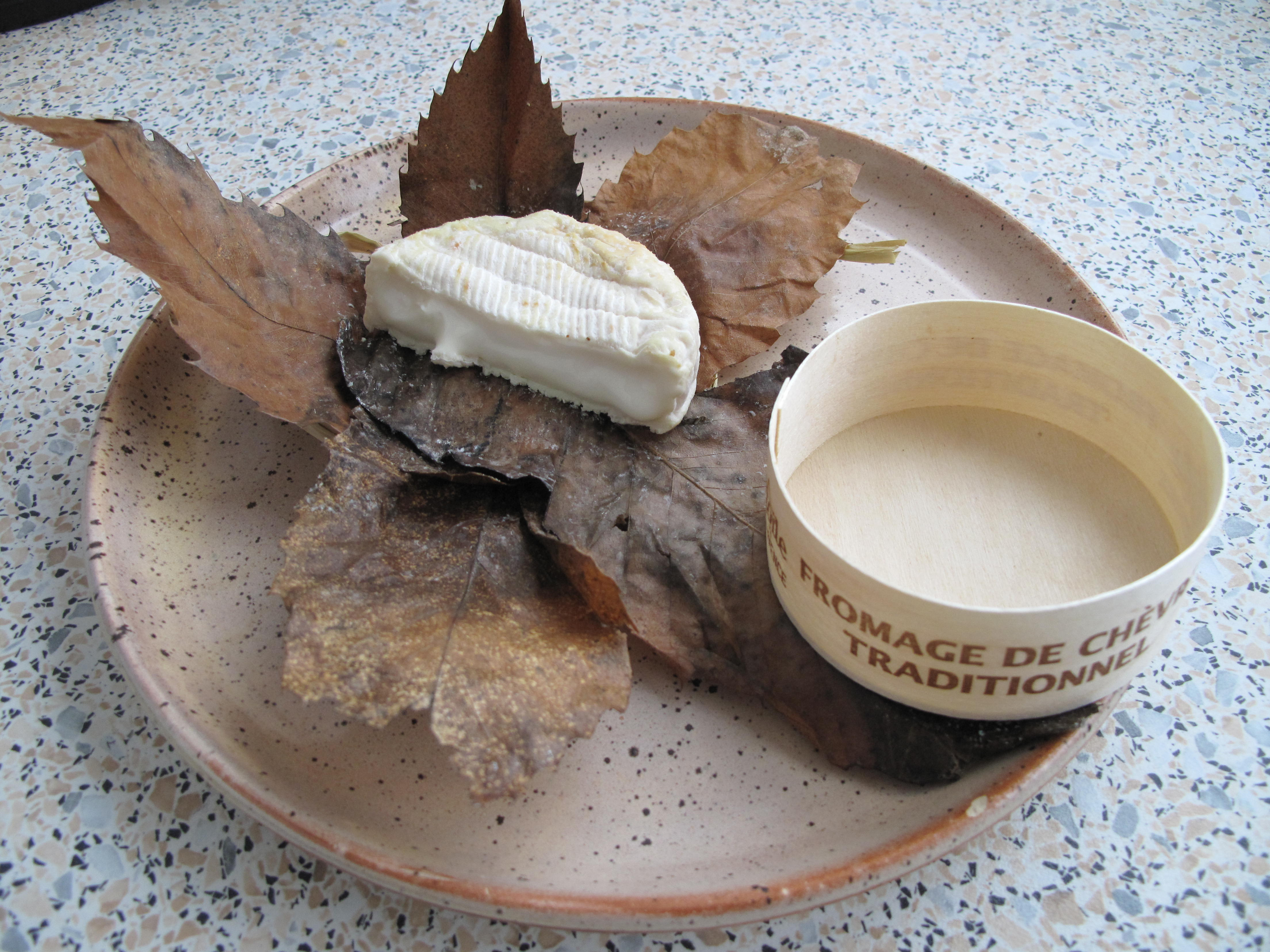
Banon cheese AOC

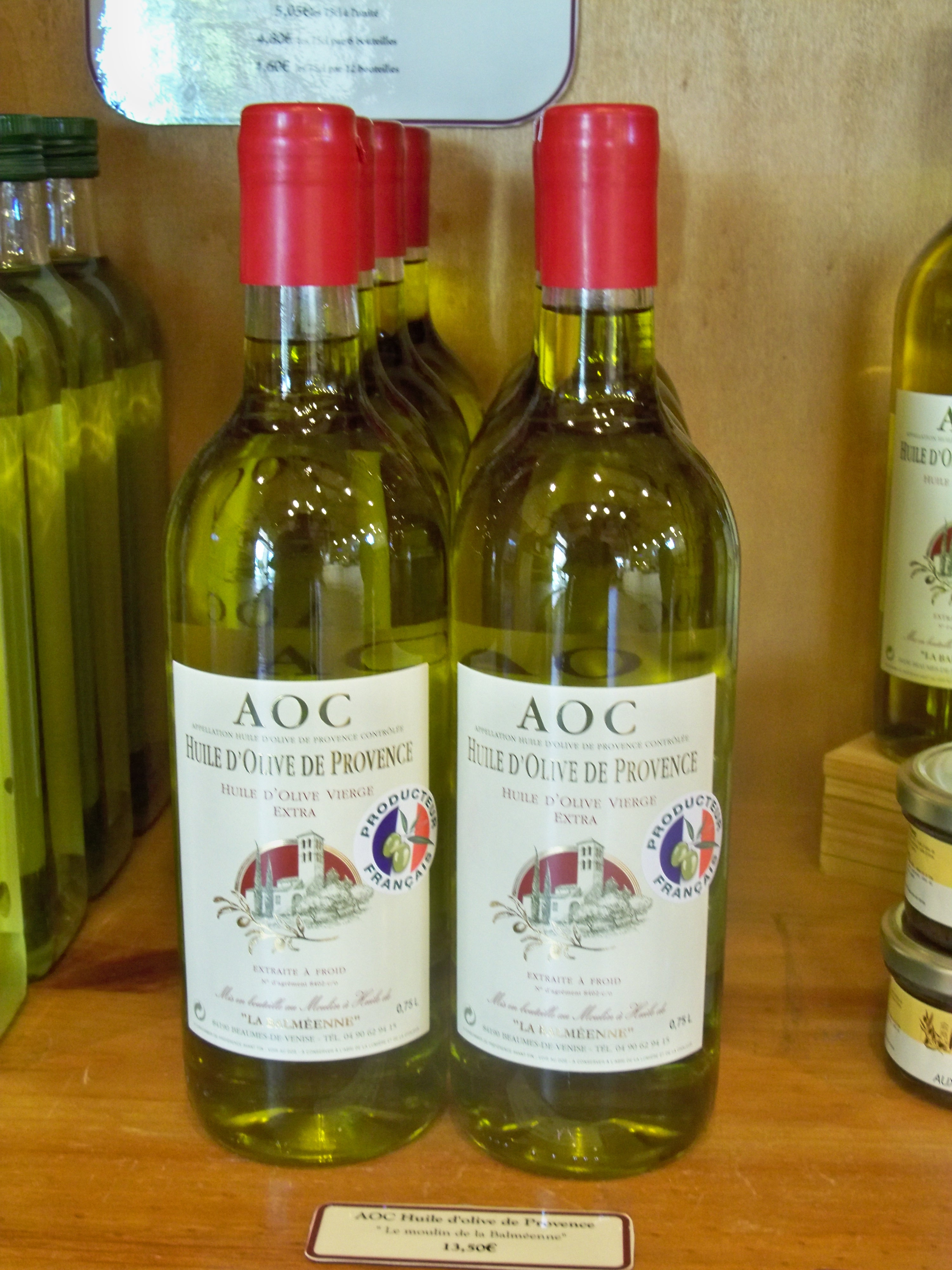
Huile de Provence AOC

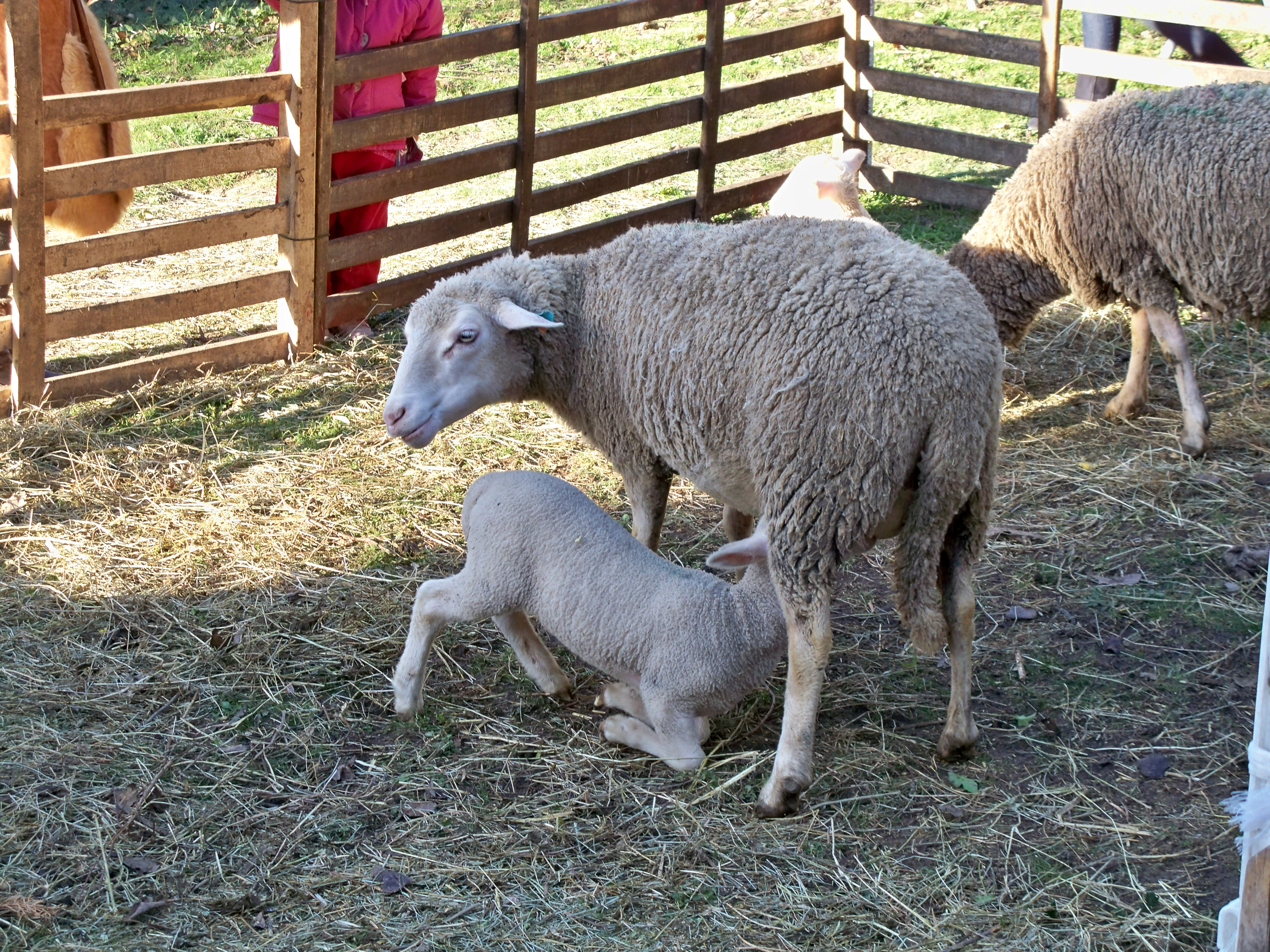
Lamb of Sisteron with its mother

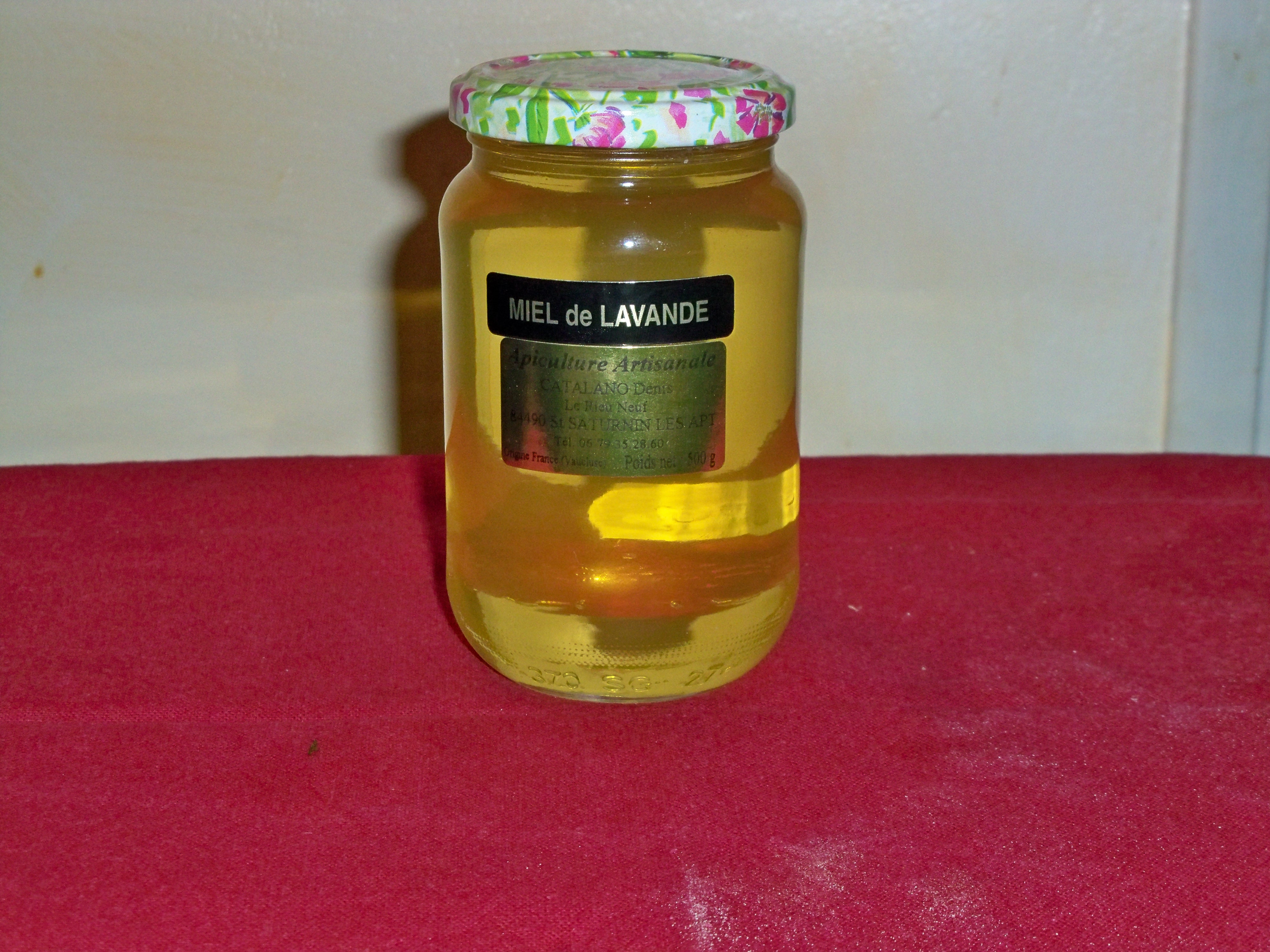
Lavender Honey

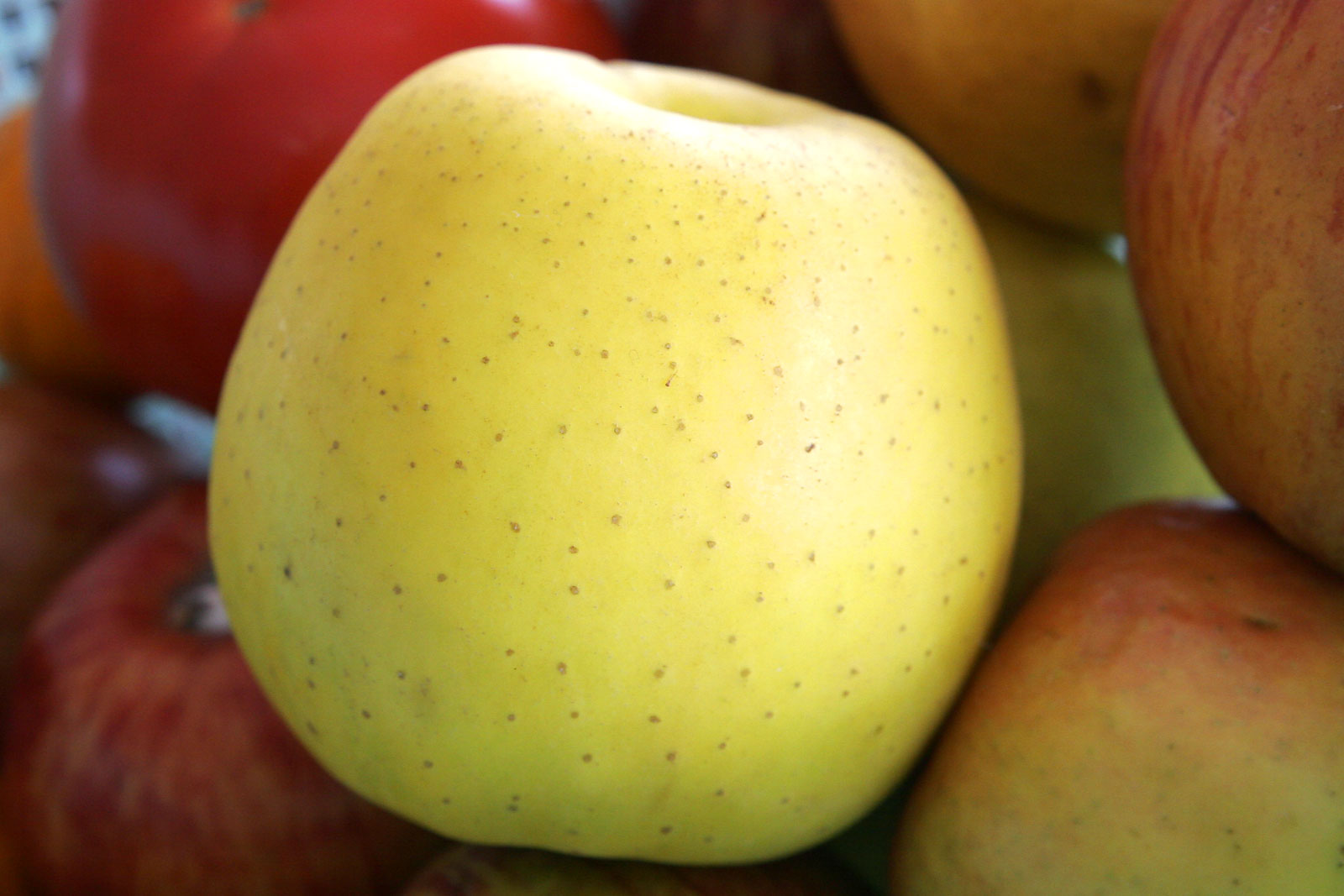
Golden delicious and Gala apples

Although the culture of lavender is now mechanized and now has an organized market as well as an AOC for "Essential oil of Lavender from Haute-Provence" since 1981, it has not seen its production revived in the region.

Goats milk from Provençal, Rove, and Alpine goats can be used to manufacture Banon cheese as in 111 other communes in Alpes-de-Haute-Provence.

Lamb of Sisteron is a red label appellation protected since 26 June 2003.

Honey of Provence is protected by a red label associated with a protected geographical indication as for honey from all flowers for Lavender Honey.

Apples of Alpes de Haute-Durance received a Protected Geographical Indication in 2010.

=== Industry ===
At the end of 2015 the secondary sector (industry and construction) had 17 establishments employing 11 people.

A quarry operated by Carrières et ballastières des Alpes transforms the limestone into aggregate.

=== Service activities ===
At the end of 2015, the tertiary sector (trades and services) had 31 establishments (with 36 employees) plus 8 administrative establishments (with 30 employees).

According to the Departmental Observatory of tourism, tourism is secondary in the commune with less than 1 per capita tourist per year. Nevertheless, the commune has several tourist accommodations available:

- at least one hotel in 2007, (two-star). It has only 9 rooms;
- the town also has a small range of furnished accommodation.

Second homes are of marginal importance with 17 units out of the 300 housing units in the commune.

== Culture and heritage ==
=== Civil heritage ===
The commune has one building that is registered as a historical monument:

- The Agricultural Cooperative (1983)

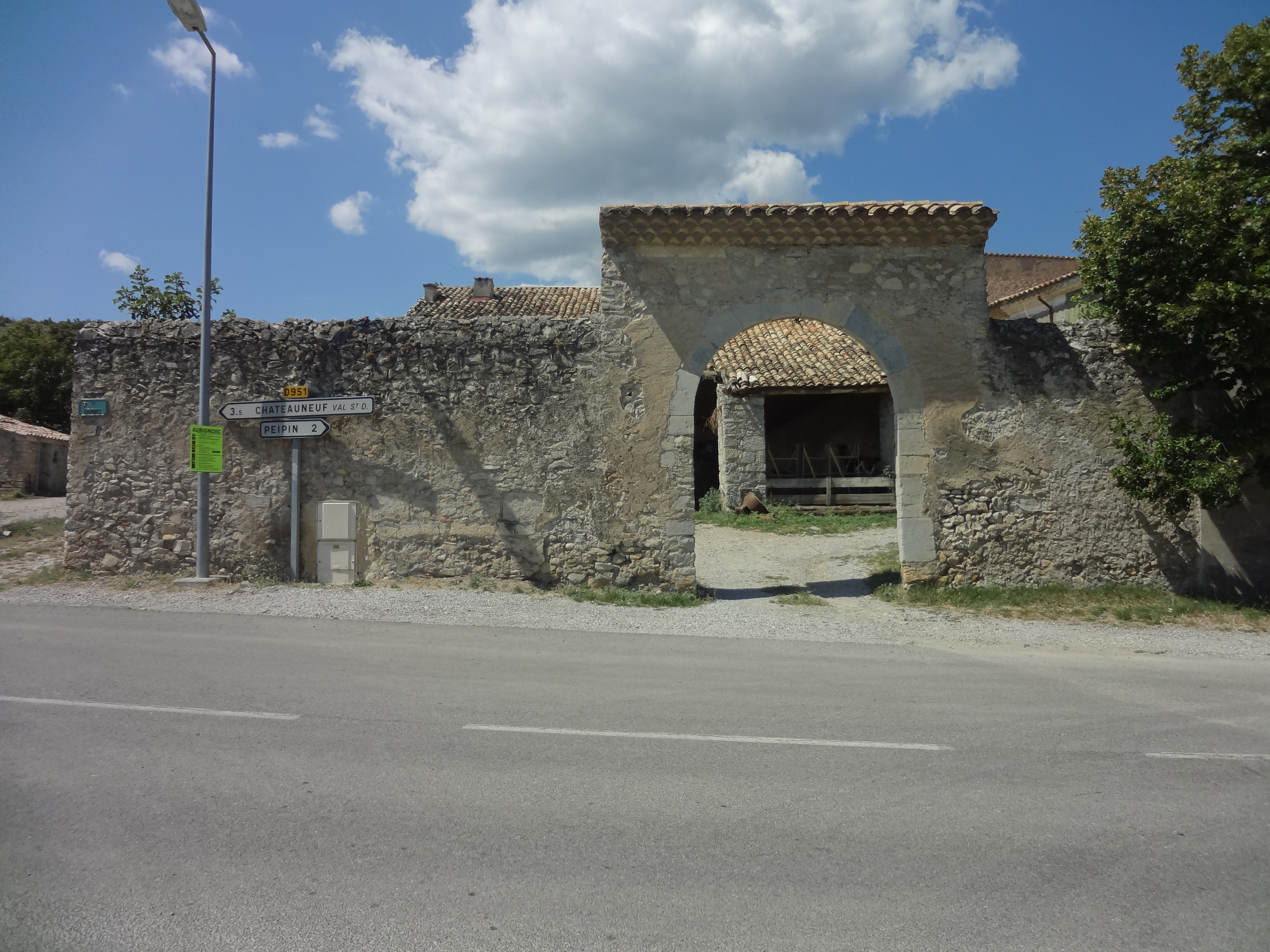
Entry to the Gravas house.

Other places of interest in the commune:

- A Noble House in Gravas decorated with a tower called a country house and which had an Ice house at the end of the 17th century.
- A Renaissance-style House at Forest which may have been the priory.

=== Religious heritage ===
- The Church of Saint Julien dates to 1662 andfeatures a double Nave and a cul-de-four (Note: An Arch-shaped quarter-sphere similar to a bread oven) vault over the Apse. The rectangular building adjoining it has some cut stones which were reused from an old church. The Church contains many items that are registered as historical objects:
  - A Painting: Saint Ann, Saint Mary, and Saint Joachim (17th century)
  - A Chalice (19th century)
  - 2 Monstrances (18th century)
  - A Painting with frame: Virgin with a rose (18th century)
  - A Statue: Virgin and Child (18th century)
  - A Statue: Saint Julien (19th century)
  - A Painting: Virgin and Child between Saint Roch and Saint Ignace of Loyola (18th century)
- The Church of the Nativity of the Virgin (1754) is located in the hamlet of Forest. The Church contains many items that are registered as historical objects:
  - A Cross (18th century)
  - A Statue: Virgin and Child (18th century)
  - A Statue: Saint Antoine of Padoue (19th century)
  - A Statue: Assumption (19th century)
  - A Painting: Sainte Famille (19th century)

Monuments in Aubignosc

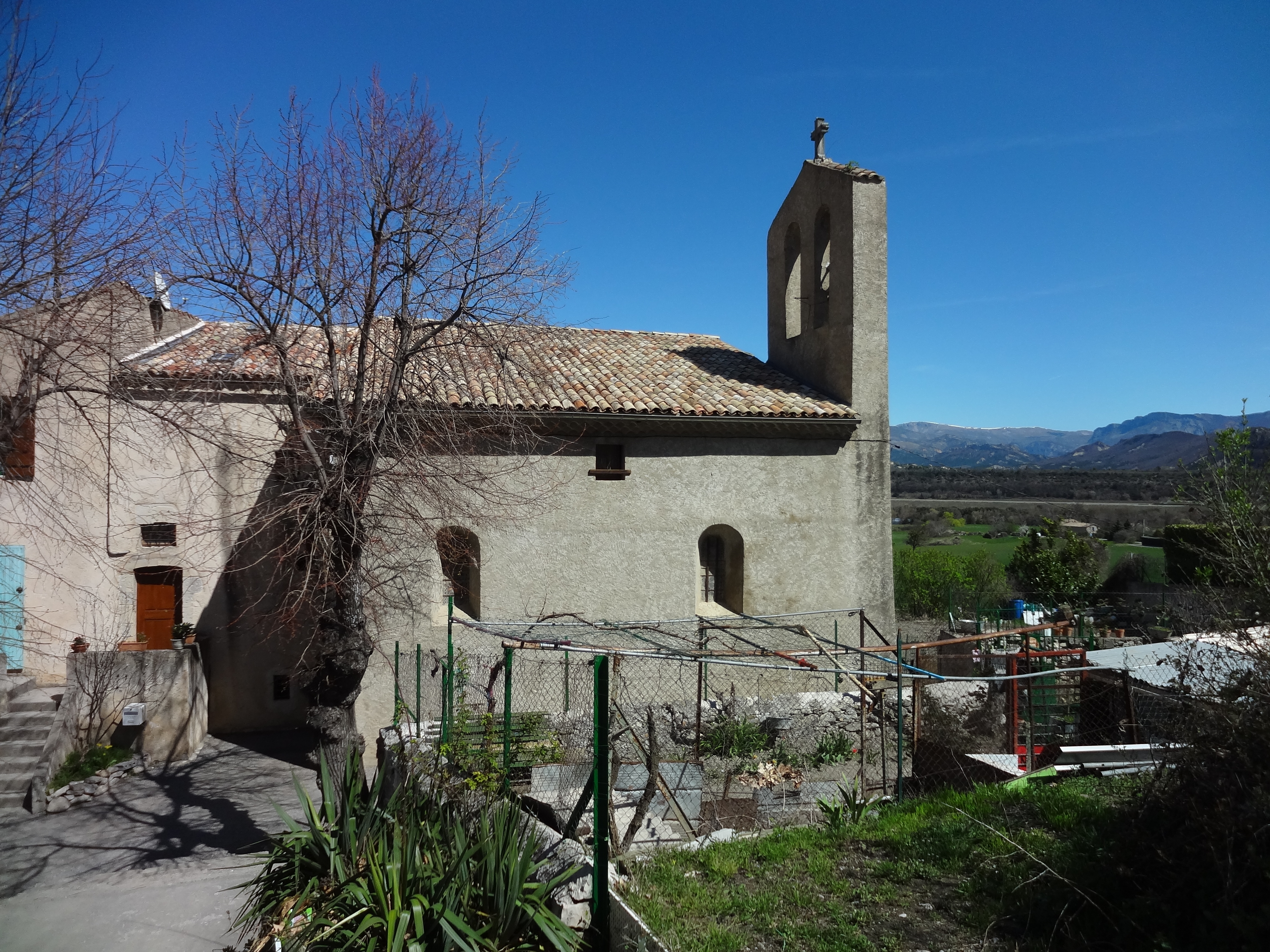
Church of Saint Julien.

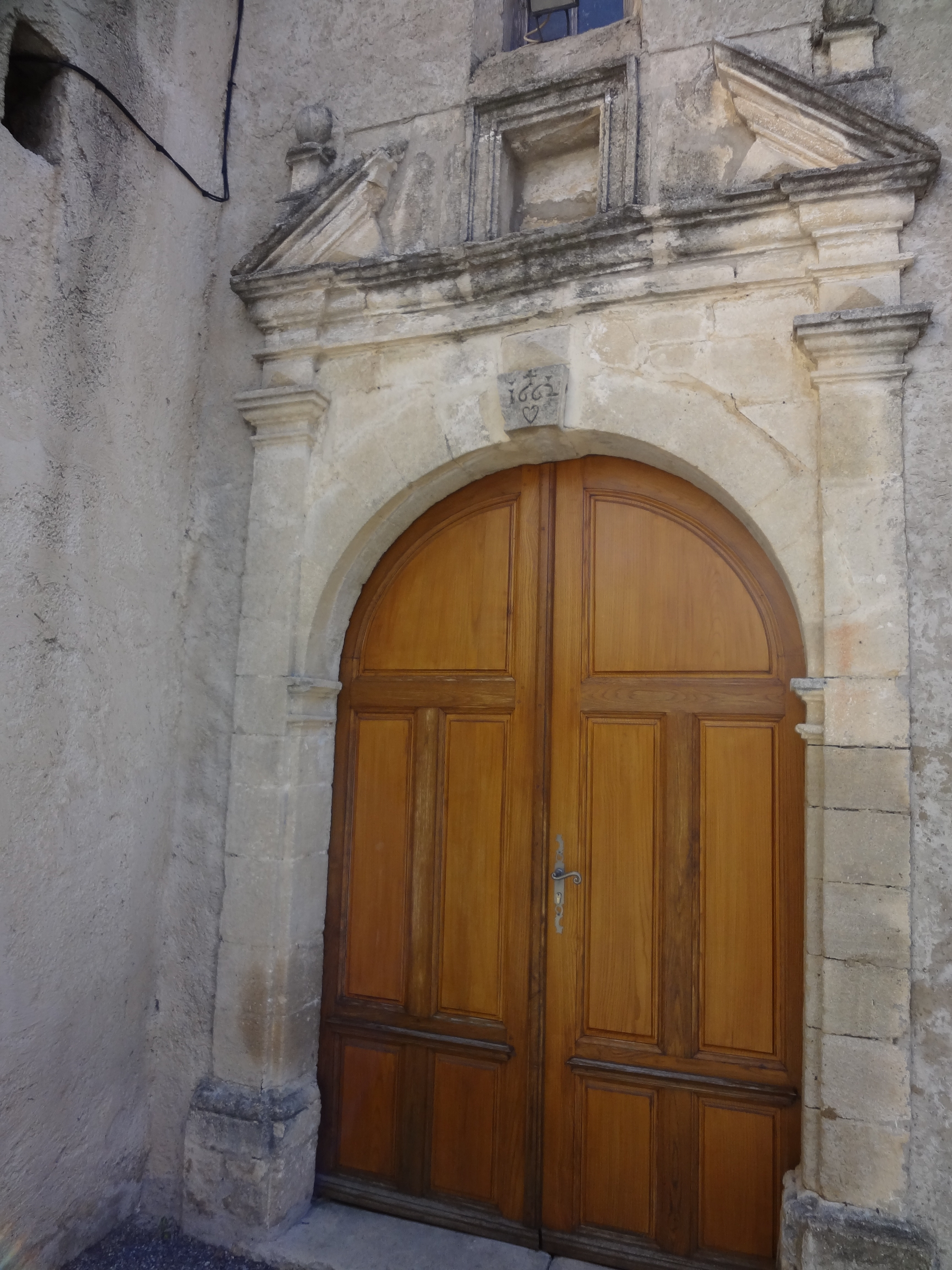
Entrance to the church.

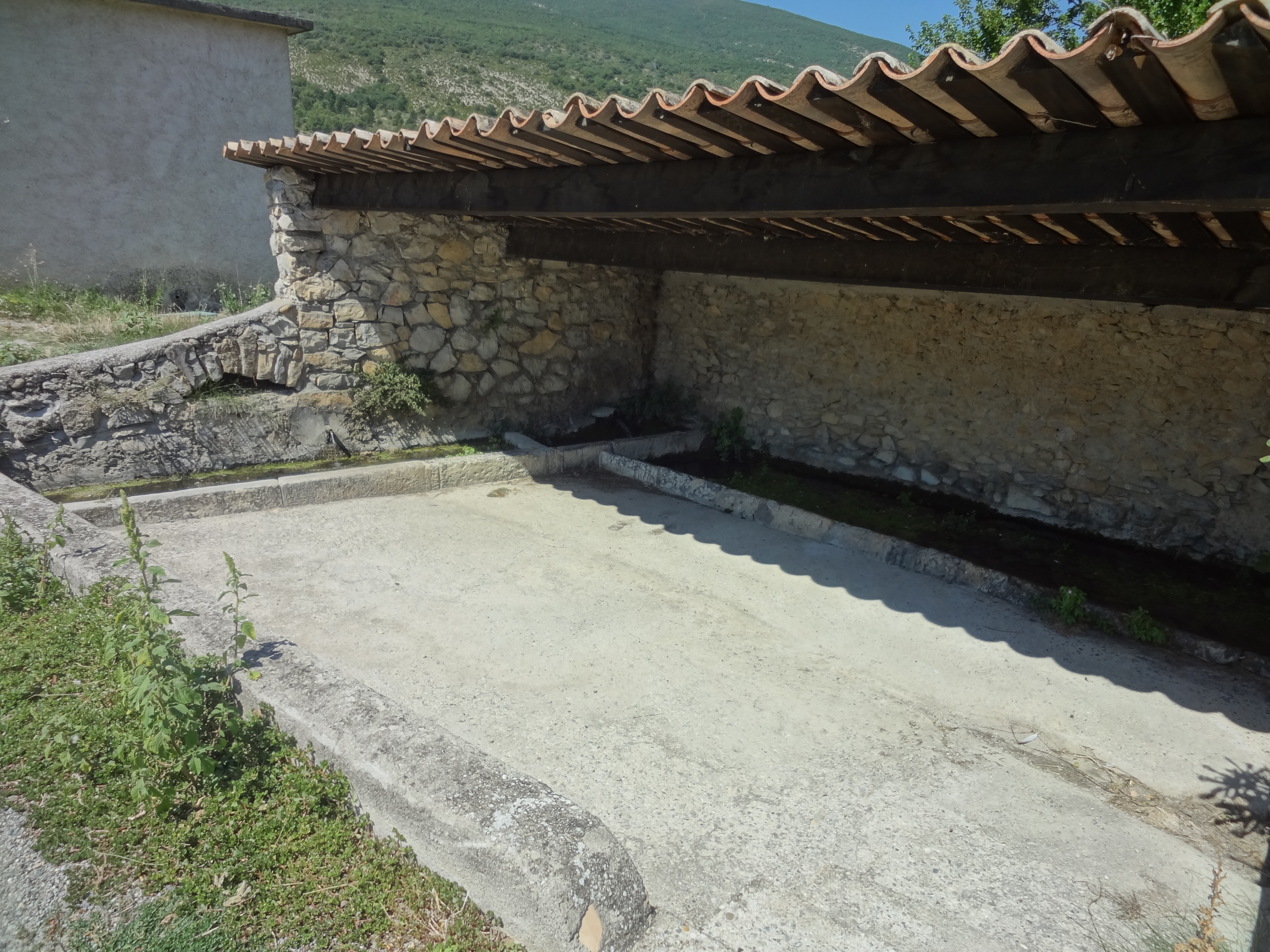
An old Lavoir (Public laundry) at Forest.

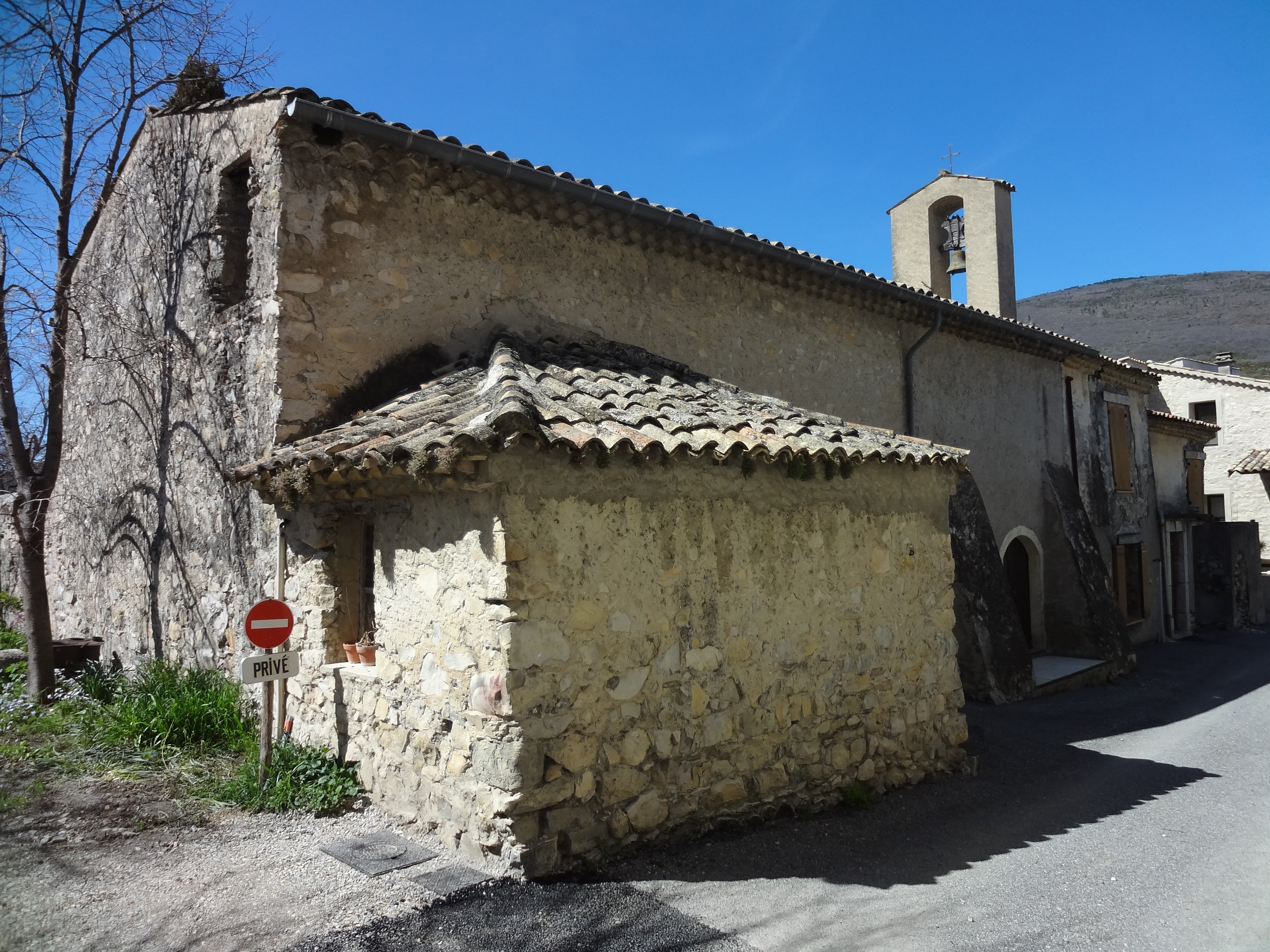
Church of the Nativity of the Virgin at Forest.

== Facilities ==
=== Education ===
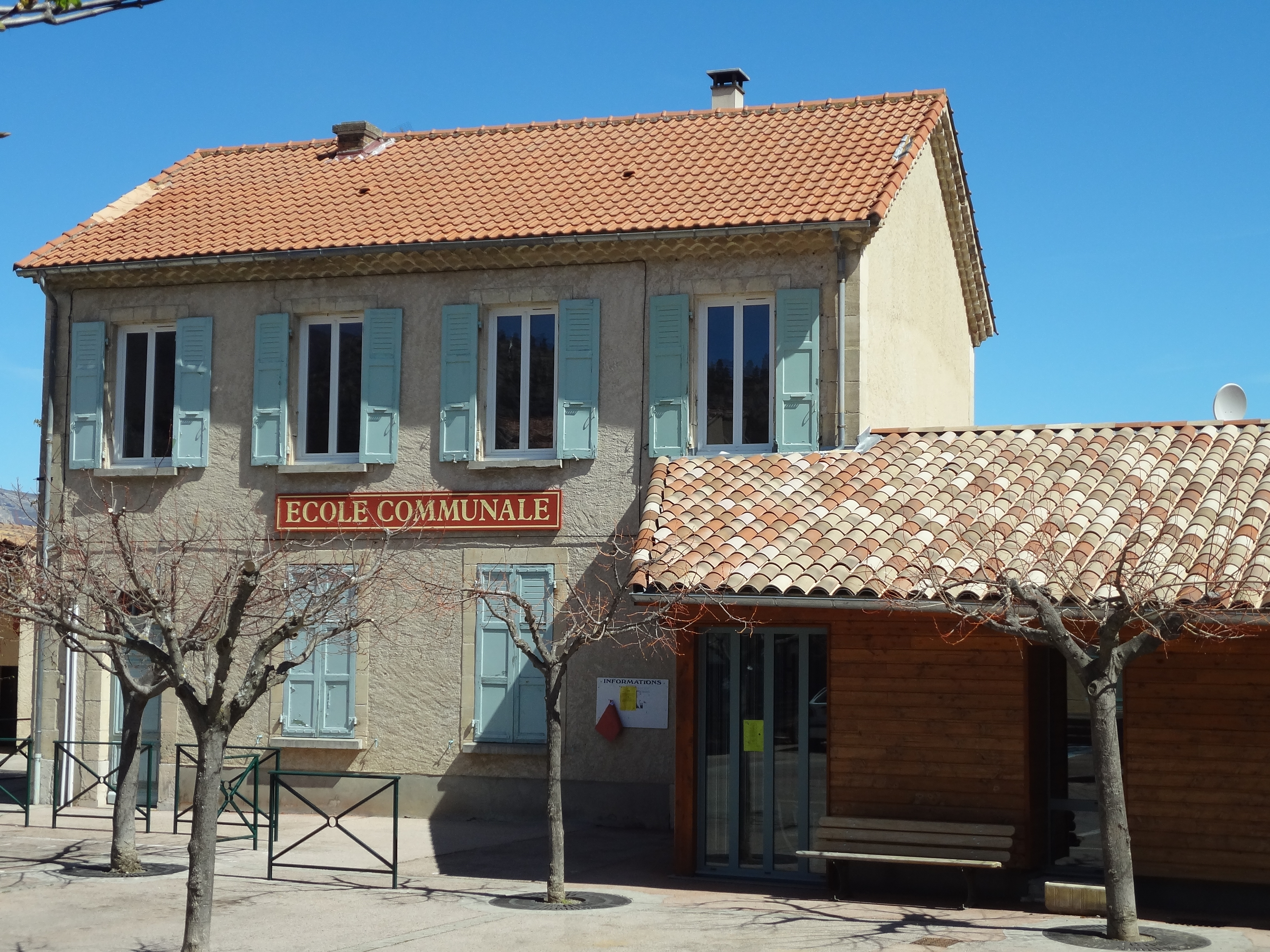
The renovated school at Aubignosc

The commune has a public primary school. The fourth class closed in 2010 at which date there were 64 children but there is nevertheless a canteen and a daycare centre.

=== Health ===
There is no doctor in Aubignosc and the closest is at Peipin (1.16 km), two others at Volonne (4.14 km), and there are others in Château-Arnoux (4.81 km). The nearest pharmacy is also at Peipin or Volonne.

Aubignosc depends on the Manosque hospital.

=== Sports ===
There is a sports field is on the communal boundary straddling Aubignosc and Peipin.

=== Worship ===
Aubignosc was part of the diocese and viguerie of Sisteron.

== See also ==
- Communes of the Alpes-de-Haute-Provence department

=== Bibliography ===
- Raymond Collier, Haute-Provence monumental and artistic, Digne, Imprimerie Louis Jean, 1986, 559 p. (in French)
- Under the direction of Édouard Baratier, Georges Duby, and Ernest Hildesheimer, Historical Atlas of Provence, County of Venaissin, Principality of Orange, County of Nice, Principality of Monaco, Librairie Armand Colin, Paris, 1969 (in French)
- Guy Barruol, Nerte Dautier, and Bernard Mondon (coord.), Mount Ventoux. Encyclopedia of a Provençale Mountain (in French)

=== External links ===
- Aubignosc on the old IGN website (in French)
- Official Aubignosc website (in French)
- Aubignosc on Géoportail, National Geographic Institute (IGN) website (in French)
- Aubignosc on the 1750 Cassini Map
