= L'Escale =

- Commune
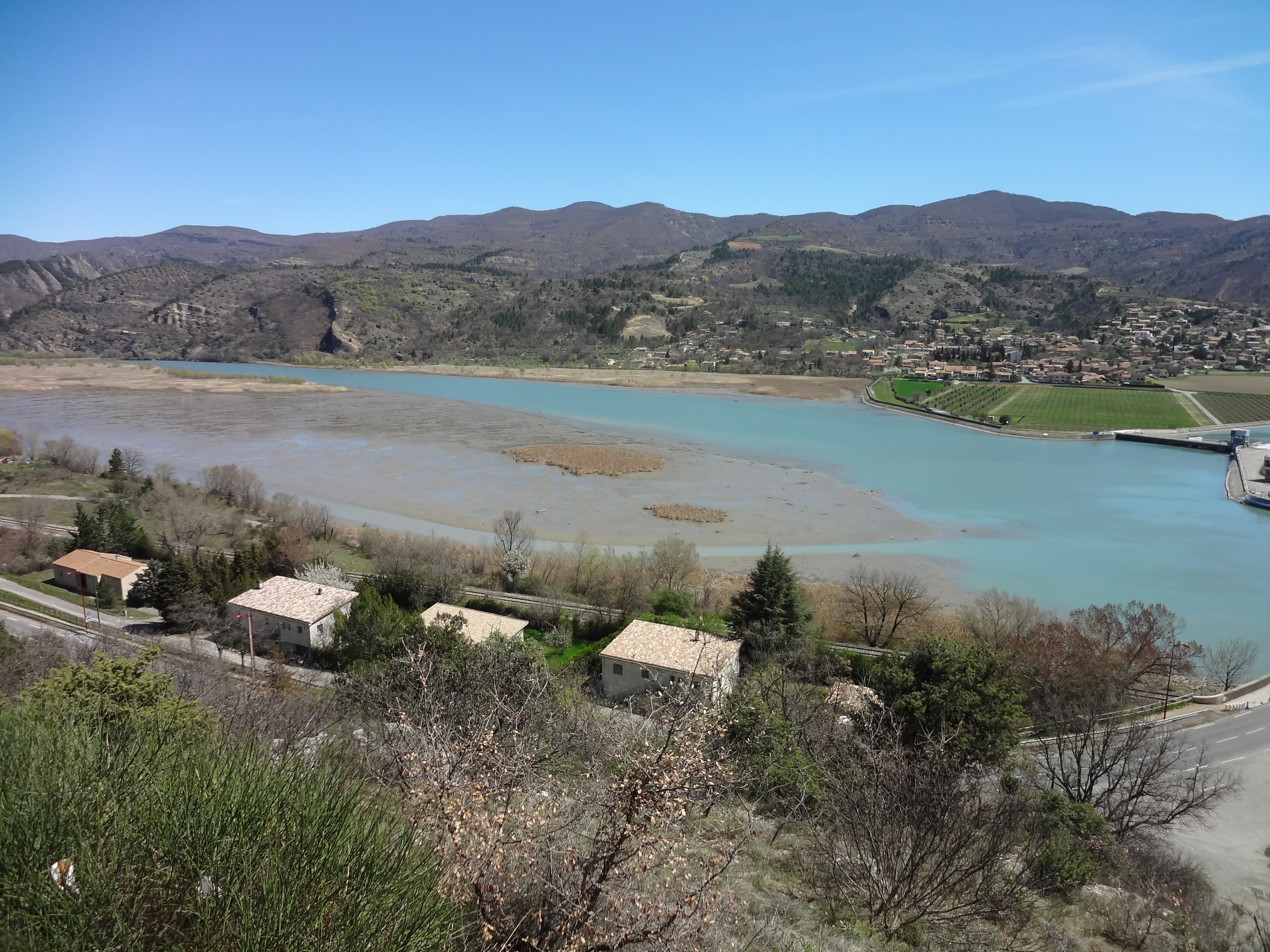
- L'Escale Lake as viewed from Château-Arnoux-Saint-Auban.

- Coat of arms
- Location of L'Escale
- Location within France Location within Provence-Alpes-Côte d'Azur
- Coordinates: 44°05′10″N 6°01′25″E
- Country: France
- Region: Provence-Alpes-Côte d'Azur
- Department: Alpes-de-Haute-Provence
- Arrondissement: Digne-les-Bains
- Canton: Château-Arnoux-Saint-Auban
- Intercommunality: Provence-Alpes Agglomération

Government
  - Mayor (2026–32): Claude Fiaert
- Area^{1}: 20.36 km^{2} (7.86 sq mi)
- Elevation: 475 m (1,558 ft)
- Highest elevation: 1,081 m (3,547 ft)
- Lowest elevation: 408 m (1,339 ft)
- Population (2023): 1,427
  - Density: 70.09/km^{2} (181.5/sq mi)
- Time zone: UTC+01:00 (CET)
  - Summer (DST): UTC+02:00 (CEST)
- INSEE/Postal code: 04079 /04160
- ^{1} French Land Register data, which excludes lakes, ponds, glaciers > 1 km^{2} (0.386 sq mi or 247 acres) and river estuaries.

L'Escale (French pronunciation: [lɛskal]; Occitan: L'Escala) is a commune in the Alpes-de-Haute-Provence department in southeastern France. It is located on the eastern bank of the Durance opposite Château-Arnoux-Saint-Auban.

== Geography ==
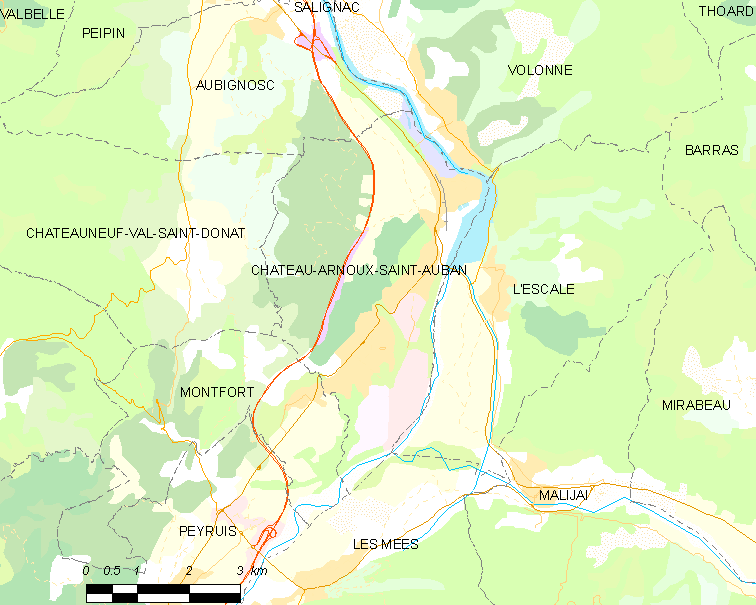
L'Escale and surrounding districts

The Bléone forms the commune's southern border, then flows into the Durance, which forms the commune's western border.

=== L'Escale Dam ===
Work began on the dam in 1959, which was completed in 1963. With a height of 30ms it retains 15.70 hm³ of water. It is 126 metres long with a road carriageway along which runs the Route Napoleon. There is attached to the dam a power station whose three units produce a total of 170,000 KWs of electricity.

== Population ==
Historical population
Year	Pop.	±% p.a.
1968	570	—
1975	722	+3.43%
1982	948	+3.97%
1990	1,100	+1.88%
1999	1,166	+0.65%
2007	1,245	+0.82%
2012	1,349	+1.62%
2017	1,389	+0.59%
2023	1,427	+0.45%
Source: INSEE

== See also ==
- Communes of the Alpes-de-Haute-Provence department
