= Ganagobie =

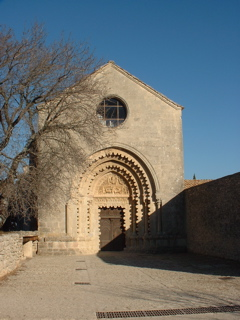
- The 12th century church of Our Lady, in Ganagobie

- Coat of arms
- Location of Ganagobie
- Location within France Location within Provence-Alpes-Côte d'Azur
- Coordinates: 44°00′34″N 5°55′00″E
- Country: France
- Region: Provence-Alpes-Côte d'Azur
- Department: Alpes-de-Haute-Provence
- Arrondissement: Digne-les-Bains
- Canton: Château-Arnoux-Saint-Auban
- Intercommunality: Provence-Alpes Agglomération

Government
  - Mayor (2026–32): Sylvie Belmonte
- Area^{1}: 10.5 km^{2} (4.1 sq mi)
- Elevation: 377 m (1,237 ft)
- Highest elevation: 719 m (2,359 ft)
- Lowest elevation: 367 m (1,204 ft)
- Population (2023): 89
  - Density: 8.5/km^{2} (22/sq mi)
- Time zone: UTC+01:00 (CET)
  - Summer (DST): UTC+02:00 (CEST)
- INSEE/Postal code: 04091 /04310
- ^{1} French Land Register data, which excludes lakes, ponds, glaciers > 1 km^{2} (0.386 sq mi or 247 acres) and river estuaries.

Ganagobie (French pronunciation: [ɡanaɡɔbi]; Occitan: Ganagòbia) is a commune in the Alpes-de-Haute-Provence department in southeastern France.

It is the site of a Benedictine monastery, the Abbey of Our Lady of Ganagobie.

== History ==
=== Prehistory and antiquity ===
The commune has been inhabited since prehistory: the north end of the plateau was home to a prehistoric village. It was fortified by a rampart 120 meters high, and therefore an oppidum. This oppidum, called "de Villevieille" (old city) from the name of the village that succeeded it, belonged to the Sogiontii. In antiquity, Ganagobie was inhabited by Sogiontii, whose territory stretched from the south of the Baronnies to the Durance. They were allied with the Vocontii, and after the Roman conquest, were included with them in the Roman province of Gallia Narbonensis. In the second century, they separated from the Vocontii and formed a distinct civitas with a capital they called Segustero, now called Sisteron.

=== Middle Ages ===
Southeast Gaul belonged to Burgundy, but in 510 the king of the Ostrogoths, Theodoric the Great, conquered the region between the Durance, the Rhône and the Isère. The commune was briefly again part of Italy, until 526. To reconcile with Godomar the king of Burgundy, the Ostrogoth regent Amalasuntha returned this territory to him. At this time two farms were installed on the plateau, one on the north and the other on the site of the priory.

The priory was founded at the end of the 10th century. The domain belonged to the bishops of Sisteron, who gave it to Cluny Abbey. This monastery remained important into the 15th century and for a time housed the relics of Saint Honoratus, moved there from Lérins Abbey.

In 1471, the community was completely depopulated by the plague and the Hundred Years War.

=== Modern era ===
In 1491, the Abbey of Cluny laid siege to the priory to take back control of it. Fighting over it continued until the French Revolution.

=== Contemporary era ===
Like many communes in the département, Ganagobie had a school well before the Jules Ferry laws: in 1863, it already had one that provided primary education to boys. No instruction was provided to girls despite the Falloux Laws of 1851, which mandated schools for girls in municipalities of more 800 inhabitants. Neither it nor the first loi Duruy of 1867, which lowered the threshold to 500, applied to Ganagobie. Not until the Ferry laws did the girls of the town receive formal educations.

Ahead of the Allied landing in Provence, two Operation Jedburgh teams parachuted in on August 8 and 9 to attack the German rear, notably its communication channels. Some 3000 FFI fighters took control of route nationale 96 (RN 96), which runs through the valley of the Durance from Manosque to Veynes. Following debarcation, Allied forces quickly broke through German defenses, and moved to cut off the Wehrmacht retreat. One column, which left Vidauban on 17 August, crossed the Durance on 20 August south of Mirabeau. The US 143rd infantry regiment went up the valley of the Durance all day on 20 August, liberating the towns and villages along the way, among them Ganagobie.

Until the middle of the 20th century, wine was grown in Ganagobie. Of mediocre quality, it was intended for local consumption, but these vineyards are abandoned today.

== Population ==
Historical population
Year	Pop.	±% p.a.
1968	121	—
1975	50	−11.86%
1982	64	+3.59%
1990	75	+2.00%
1999	91	+2.17%
2007	106	+1.93%
2012	84	−4.55%
2017	96	+2.71%
2023	89	−1.25%
Source: INSEE

== See also ==
- Communes of the Alpes-de-Haute-Provence department
