= Canton of Château-Arnoux-Saint-Auban =

Coordinates: 44.09°N 6.01°E

- Canton
- Situation of the canton of Château-Arnoux-Saint-Auban in the department of Alpes-de-Haute-Provence
- Country: France
- Region: Provence-Alpes-Côte d'Azur
- Department: Alpes-de-Haute-Provence
- No. of communes: {{{nbcomm}}}
- Population (2023): 12,545
- INSEE code: 0403

The canton of Château-Arnoux-Saint-Auban is an administrative division of the Alpes-de-Haute-Provence department in southeastern France. It was created in the French canton reorganisation which came into effect in March 2015. Its seat is Château-Arnoux-Saint-Auban.

It consists of the following communes:

1. Aubignosc
2. Château-Arnoux-Saint-Auban
3. Châteauneuf-Val-Saint-Donat
4. L'Escale
5. Ganagobie
6. Montfort
7. Peyruis
8. Volonne
