= Peyruis =

Peyruis Peirueis (Occitan)
- Commune
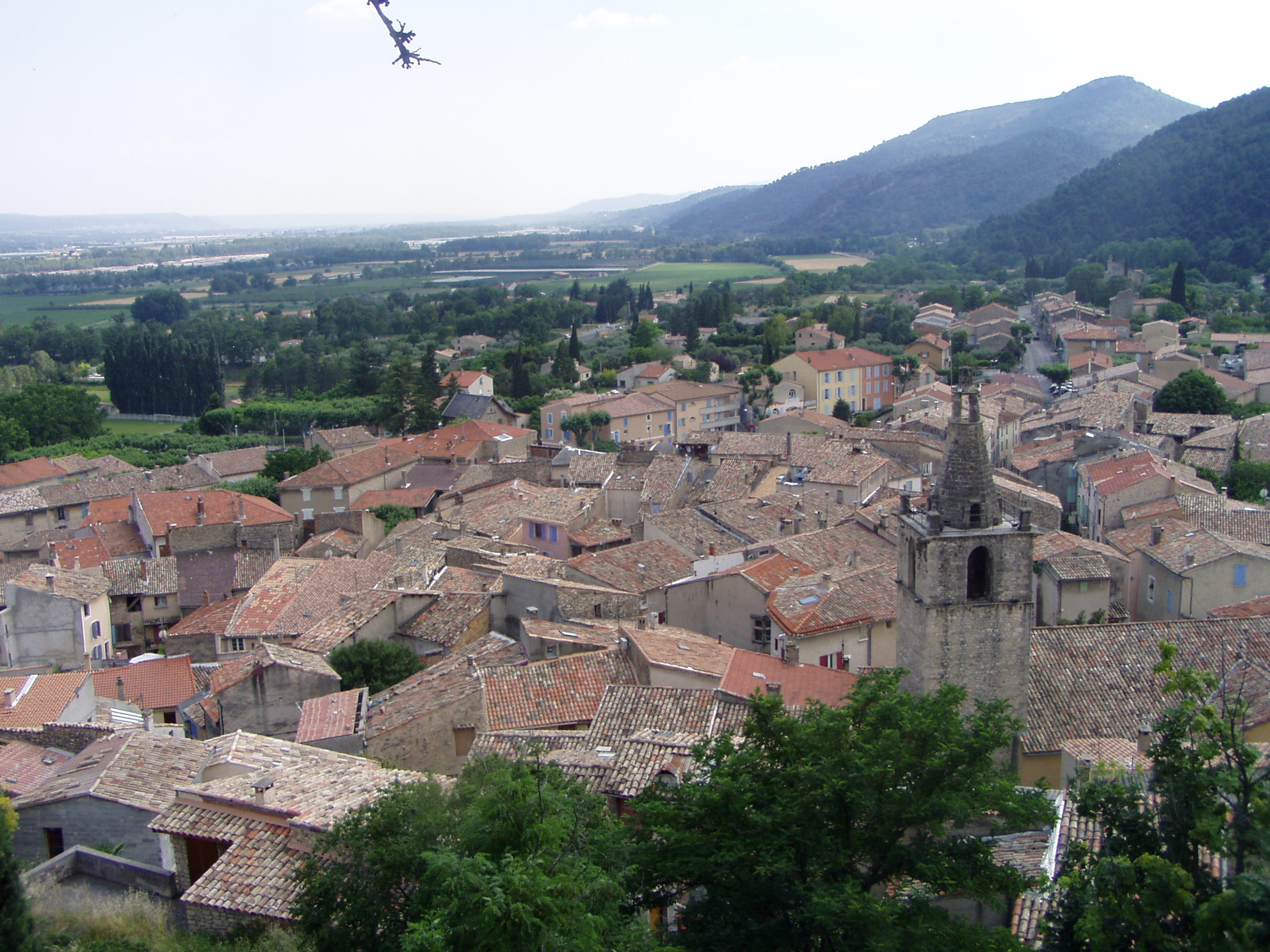
- The village of Peyruis, seen from the castle

- Coat of arms
- Location of Peyruis
- Location within France Location within Provence-Alpes-Côte d'Azur
- Coordinates: 44°01′48″N 5°56′28″E
- Country: France
- Region: Provence-Alpes-Côte d'Azur
- Department: Alpes-de-Haute-Provence
- Arrondissement: Digne-les-Bains
- Canton: Château-Arnoux-Saint-Auban
- Intercommunality: CA Provence-Alpes

Government
  - Mayor (2026–32): Lila Desjardins
- Area^{1}: 23.23 km^{2} (8.97 sq mi)
- Elevation: 403 m (1,322 ft)
- Highest elevation: 740 m (2,430 ft)
- Lowest elevation: 381 m (1,250 ft)
- Population (2023): 2,798
  - Density: 120.4/km^{2} (312.0/sq mi)
- Demonym: Peyruisiens
- Time zone: UTC+01:00 (CET)
  - Summer (DST): UTC+02:00 (CEST)
- INSEE/Postal code: 04149 /04310
- Website: www.peyruis.fr
- ^{1} French Land Register data, which excludes lakes, ponds, glaciers > 1 km^{2} (0.386 sq mi or 247 acres) and river estuaries.

Peyruis (French pronunciation: [peʁɥi]; Occitan: Peirueis) is a commune in the Alpes-de-Haute-Provence department in the Provence-Alpes-Côte d'Azur region in southeastern France.

== Population ==
Its inhabitants are referred to as Peyruisiens (masculine) and Peyruisiennes (feminine) in French.

Historical population
| Year | Pop. | ±% p.a. |
|---|---|---|
| 1968 | 1,610 | — |
| 1975 | 1,627 | +0.15% |
| 1982 | 1,699 | +0.62% |
| 1990 | 2,036 | +2.29% |
| 1999 | 2,217 | +0.95% |
| 2007 | 2,468 | +1.35% |
| 2012 | 2,767 | +2.31% |
| 2017 | 2,858 | +0.65% |
| 2023 | 2,798 | −0.35% |
Source: INSEE

== See also ==
- Communes of the Alpes-de-Haute-Provence department
