= Montfort, Alpes-de-Haute-Provence =

Montfort
- Commune
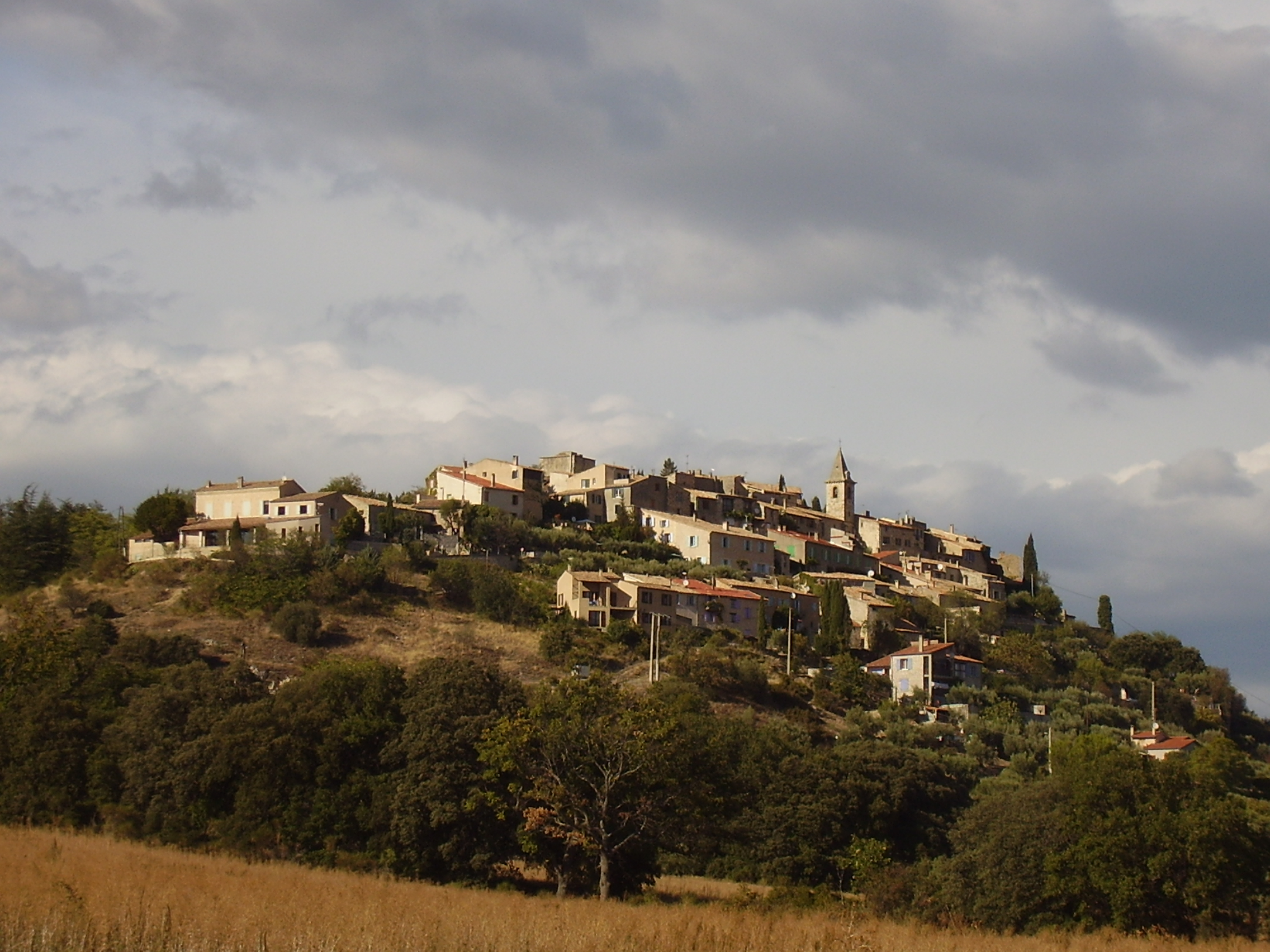
- A general view of the village of Montfort

- Coat of arms
- Location of Montfort
- Location within France Location within Provence-Alpes-Côte d'Azur
- Coordinates: 44°03′52″N 5°58′24″E
- Country: France
- Region: Provence-Alpes-Côte d'Azur
- Department: Alpes-de-Haute-Provence
- Arrondissement: Forcalquier
- Canton: Château-Arnoux-Saint-Auban

Government
  - Mayor (2026–32): Nathalie Nicolino
- Area^{1}: 12.08 km^{2} (4.66 sq mi)
- Elevation: 500 m (1,600 ft)
- Highest elevation: 860 m (2,820 ft)
- Lowest elevation: 395 m (1,296 ft)
- Population (2023): 343
  - Density: 28.4/km^{2} (73.5/sq mi)
- Time zone: UTC+01:00 (CET)
  - Summer (DST): UTC+02:00 (CEST)
- INSEE/Postal code: 04127 /04600
- ^{1} French Land Register data, which excludes lakes, ponds, glaciers > 1 km^{2} (0.386 sq mi or 247 acres) and river estuaries.

Montfort (French pronunciation: [mɔ̃fɔʁ]; Occitan: Montfòrt) is a commune in the Alpes-de-Haute-Provence department in southeastern France.

== Population ==
Historical population
Year	Pop.	±% p.a.
1968	142	—
1975	240	+7.79%
1982	259	+1.09%
1990	382	+4.98%
1999	385	+0.09%
2007	396	+0.35%
2012	367	−1.51%
2017	332	−1.98%
2023	343	+0.54%
Source: INSEE

== See also ==
- Communes of the Alpes-de-Haute-Provence department
