= Châteauneuf-Val-Saint-Donat =

Châteauneuf-Val-Saint-Donat Chastèunòu Vau Sant Donat (Occitan)
- Commune
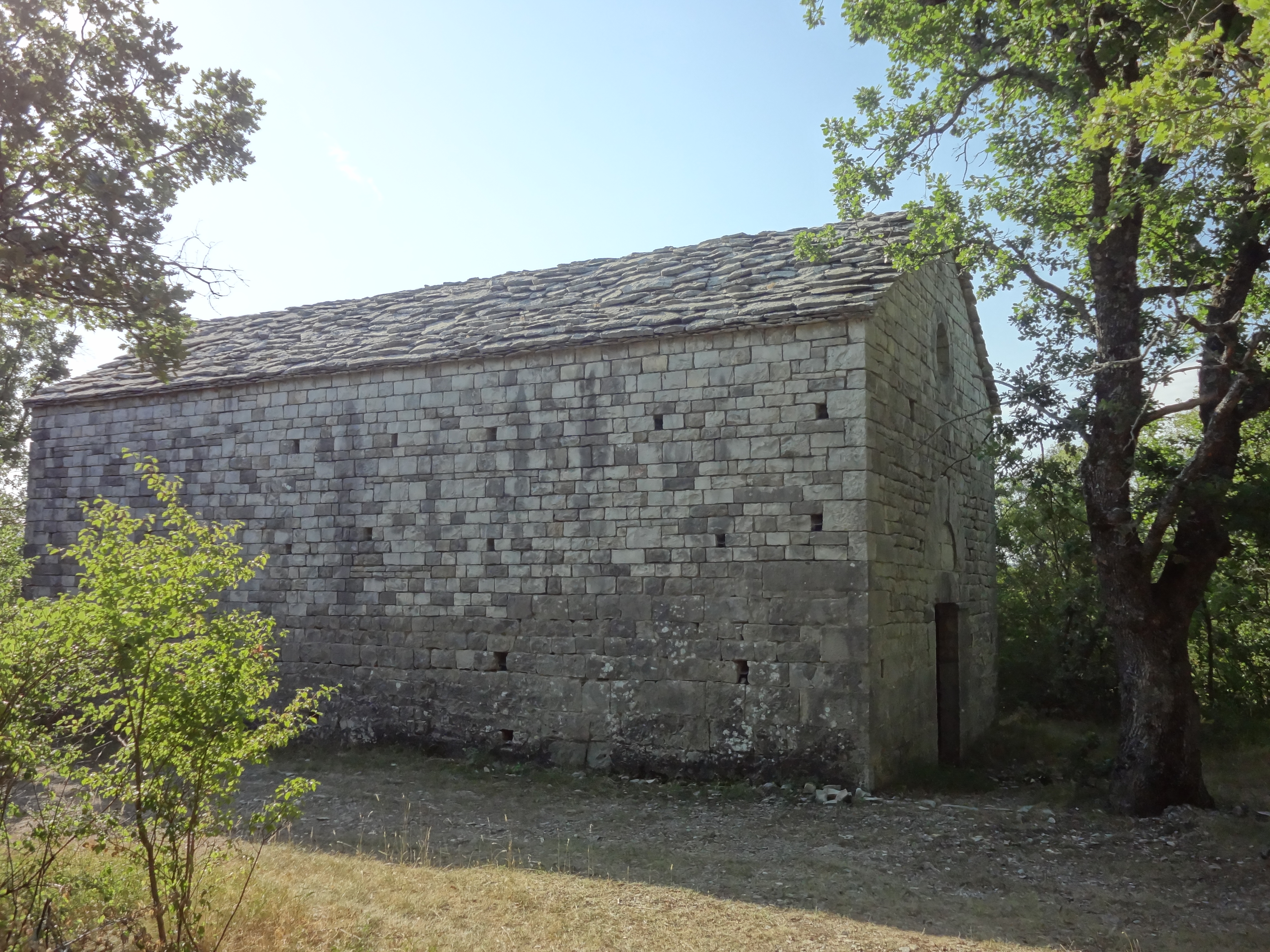
- Chapel of St. Madeleine

- Coat of arms
- Location of Châteauneuf-Val-Saint-Donat
- Location within France Location within Provence-Alpes-Côte d'Azur
- Coordinates: 44°05′42″N 5°57′01″E
- Country: France
- Region: Provence-Alpes-Côte d'Azur
- Department: Alpes-de-Haute-Provence
- Arrondissement: Forcalquier
- Canton: Château-Arnoux-Saint-Auban

Government
  - Mayor (2026–32): Didier Rouit
- Area^{1}: 21.1 km^{2} (8.1 sq mi)
- Highest elevation: 1,458 m (4,783 ft)
- Lowest elevation: 480 m (1,570 ft)
- Population (2023): 532
  - Density: 25.2/km^{2} (65.3/sq mi)
- Demonym: Chabannais
- Time zone: UTC+01:00 (CET)
  - Summer (DST): UTC+02:00 (CEST)
- INSEE/Postal code: 04053 /04200
- ^{1} French Land Register data, which excludes lakes, ponds, glaciers > 1 km^{2} (0.386 sq mi or 247 acres) and river estuaries.

Châteauneuf-Val-Saint-Donat (French: [ʃɑtonœf val sɛ̃ dɔna]; Occitan: Chastèunòu Vau Sant Donat) is a commune in the Alpes-de-Haute-Provence department in southeastern France.

== Population ==
Historical population
Year	Pop.	±% p.a.
1968	139	—
1975	141	+0.20%
1982	191	+4.43%
1990	296	+5.63%
1999	348	+1.81%
2007	505	+4.76%
2012	497	−0.32%
2017	504	+0.28%
2023	532	+0.91%
Source: INSEE

== See also ==
- Communes of the Alpes-de-Haute-Provence department
