= Peipin =

- Commune
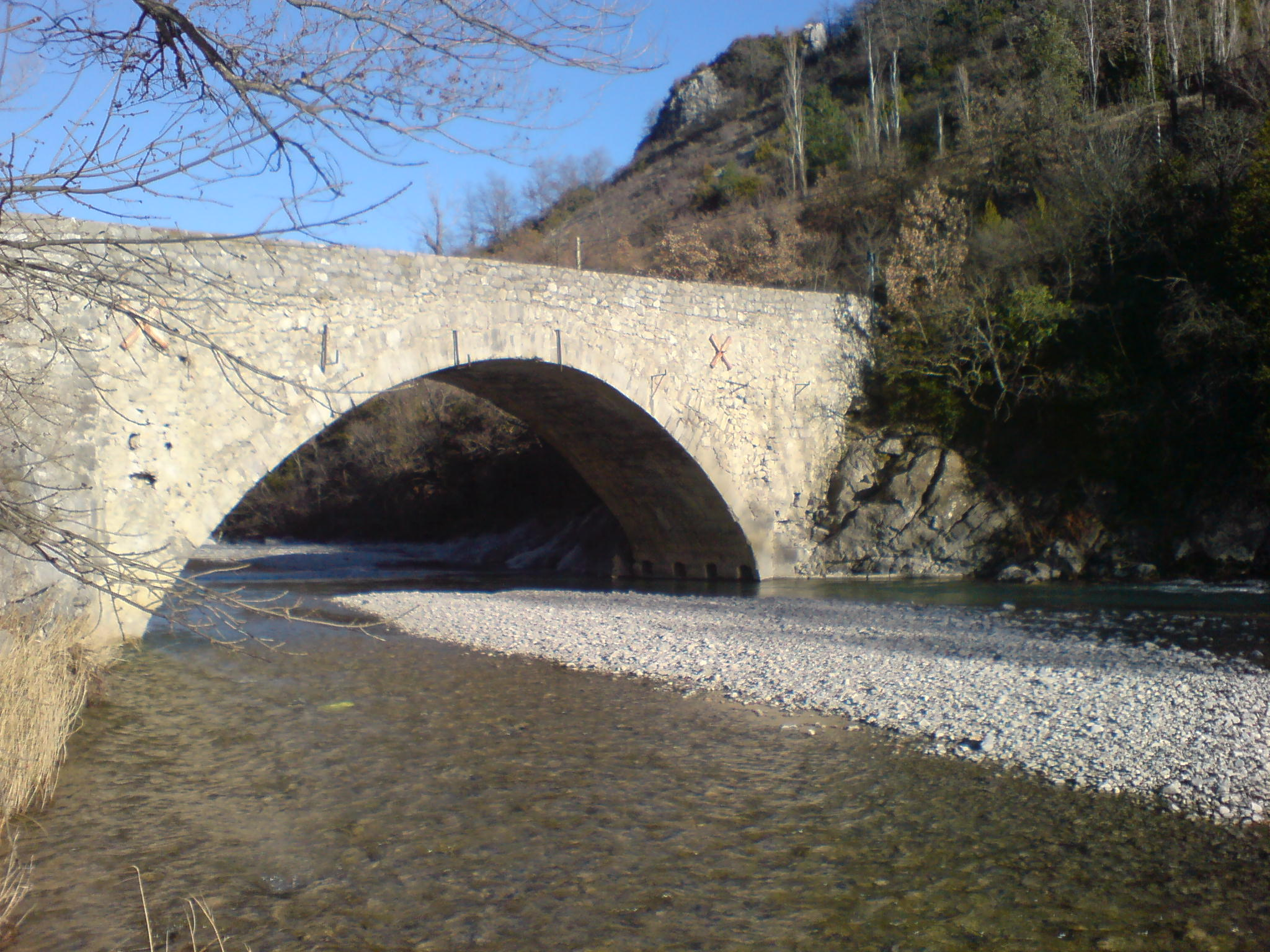
- Pont de Peipin

- Coat of arms
- Location of Peipin
- Location within France Location within Provence-Alpes-Côte d'Azur
- Coordinates: 44°08′16″N 5°57′26″E
- Country: France
- Region: Provence-Alpes-Côte d'Azur
- Department: Alpes-de-Haute-Provence
- Arrondissement: Forcalquier
- Canton: Sisteron
- Intercommunality: Jabron Lure Vançon Durance

Government
  - Mayor (2026–32): Farid Rahmoun
- Area^{1}: 13.15 km^{2} (5.08 sq mi)
- Elevation: 456 m (1,496 ft)
- Highest elevation: 1,281 m (4,203 ft)
- Lowest elevation: 438 m (1,437 ft)
- Population (2023): 1,506
  - Density: 114.5/km^{2} (296.6/sq mi)
- Time zone: UTC+01:00 (CET)
  - Summer (DST): UTC+02:00 (CEST)
- INSEE/Postal code: 04145 /04200
- ^{1} French Land Register data, which excludes lakes, ponds, glaciers > 1 km^{2} (0.386 sq mi or 247 acres) and river estuaries.

Peipin (French pronunciation: [pɛpɛ̃]) is a commune in the Alpes-de-Haute-Provence department in southeastern France.

== Population ==
Historical population
Year	Pop.	±% p.a.
1968	433	—
1975	534	+3.04%
1982	710	+4.15%
1990	1,008	+4.48%
1999	1,049	+0.44%
2007	1,226	+1.97%
2012	1,482	+3.87%
2017	1,464	−0.24%
2023	1,506	+0.47%
Source: INSEE

== See also ==
- Communes of the Alpes-de-Haute-Provence department
