= Volonne =

- Commune
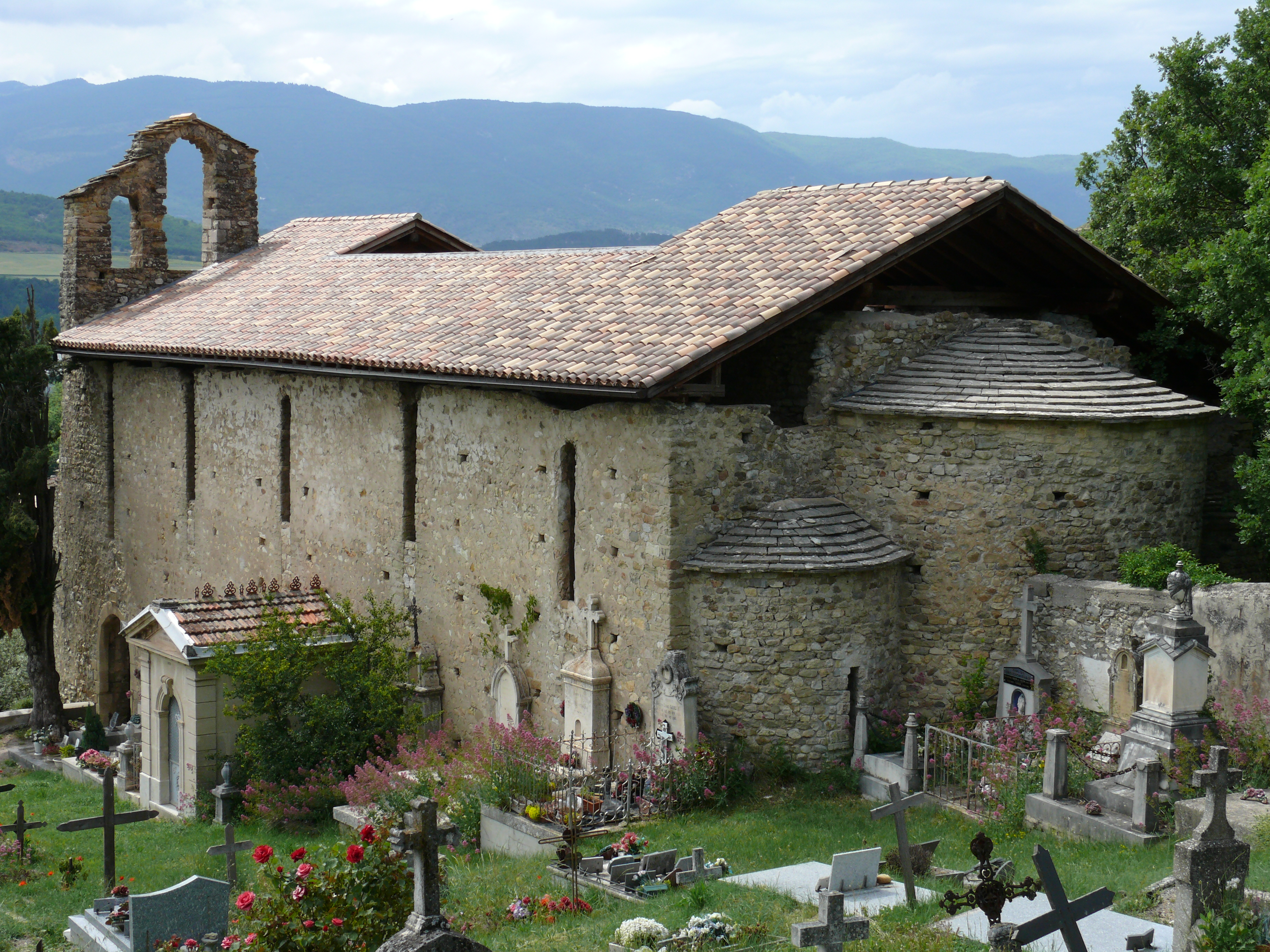
- The church of Saint-Martin, in Volonne

- Coat of arms
- Location of Volonne
- Location within France Location within Provence-Alpes-Côte d'Azur
- Coordinates: 44°06′42″N 6°00′54″E
- Country: France
- Region: Provence-Alpes-Côte d'Azur
- Department: Alpes-de-Haute-Provence
- Arrondissement: Digne-les-Bains
- Canton: Château-Arnoux-Saint-Auban
- Intercommunality: Provence-Alpes Agglomération

Government
  - Mayor (2026–32): Sandrine Cosserat
- Area^{1}: 24.61 km^{2} (9.50 sq mi)
- Highest elevation: 1,244 m (4,081 ft)
- Lowest elevation: 433 m (1,421 ft)
- Population (2023): 1,633
  - Density: 66.36/km^{2} (171.9/sq mi)
- Time zone: UTC+01:00 (CET)
  - Summer (DST): UTC+02:00 (CEST)
- INSEE/Postal code: 04244 /04290
- ^{1} French Land Register data, which excludes lakes, ponds, glaciers > 1 km^{2} (0.386 sq mi or 247 acres) and river estuaries.

Volonne (French pronunciation: [vɔlɔn]) is a commune in the Alpes-de-Haute-Provence department in southeastern France.

== Population ==
Historical population
Year	Pop.	±% p.a.
1968	1,070	—
1975	1,253	+2.28%
1982	1,309	+0.63%
1990	1,387	+0.73%
1999	1,514	+0.98%
2007	1,643	+1.03%
2012	1,676	+0.40%
2017	1,650	−0.31%
2023	1,633	−0.17%
Source: INSEE

== See also ==
- Communes of the Alpes-de-Haute-Provence department
