= Château-Arnoux-Saint-Auban =

Château-Arnoux-Saint-Auban Castèl-Arnós e Sant Auban (Occitan)
- Commune
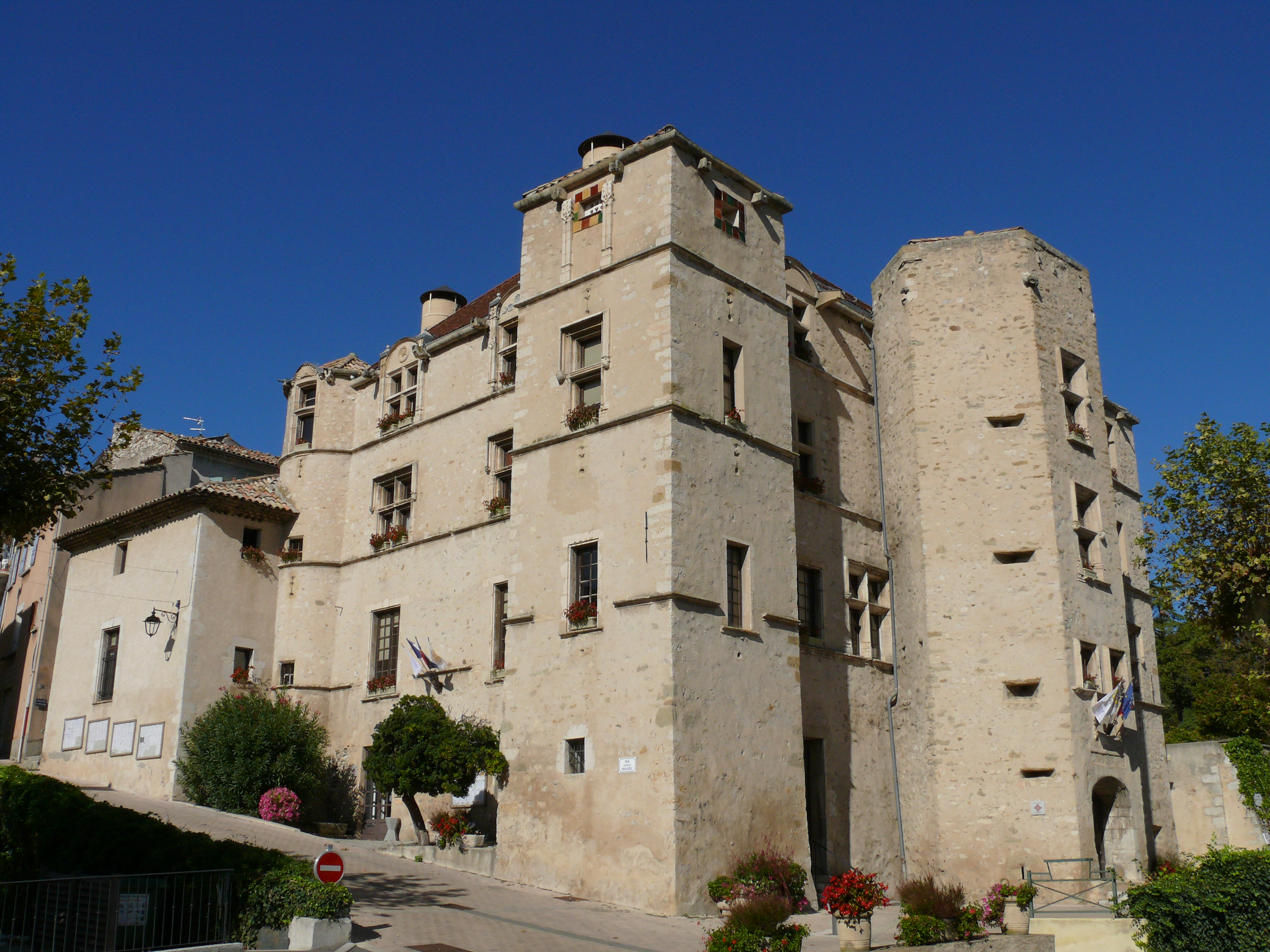
- Chateau

- Coat of arms
- Location of Château-Arnoux-Saint-Auban
- Location within France Location within Provence-Alpes-Côte d'Azur
- Coordinates: 44°05′39″N 6°00′33″E
- Country: France
- Region: Provence-Alpes-Côte d'Azur
- Department: Alpes-de-Haute-Provence
- Arrondissement: Digne-les-Bains
- Canton: Château-Arnoux-Saint-Auban
- Intercommunality: CA Provence-Alpes

Government
  - Mayor (2026–32): Philippe Bertrand
- Area^{1}: 18.34 km^{2} (7.08 sq mi)
- Elevation: 440 m (1,440 ft)
- Highest elevation: 742 m (2,434 ft)
- Lowest elevation: 403 m (1,322 ft)
- Population (2023): 5,107
  - Density: 278.5/km^{2} (721.2/sq mi)
- Time zone: UTC+01:00 (CET)
  - Summer (DST): UTC+02:00 (CEST)
- INSEE/Postal code: 04049 /04160
- ^{1} French Land Register data, which excludes lakes, ponds, glaciers > 1 km^{2} (0.386 sq mi or 247 acres) and river estuaries.

Château-Arnoux-Saint-Auban (French: [ʃɑto aʁnu sɛ̃t‿obɑ̃]; Occitan: Castèl-Arnós e Sant Auban, before 1991: Château-Arnoux) is a commune in the department of Alpes-de-Haute-Provence in the region of Provence-Alpes-Côte d'Azur in southeastern France.

== History ==
The first reference to the château is as Castrum Arnulphi, meaning the 'castle of Arnulf'. Saint-Auban references St Alban, a Christian martyr. They were originally two settlements before being joined as one commune in 1991. The inhabitants are known as jarlandins, referring to the tradition of jar-making in the area.

Château-Arnoux-Saint-Auban is on the Route Napoléon, the route taken by Napoléon in 1815 on his return from Elba.

== Geography ==
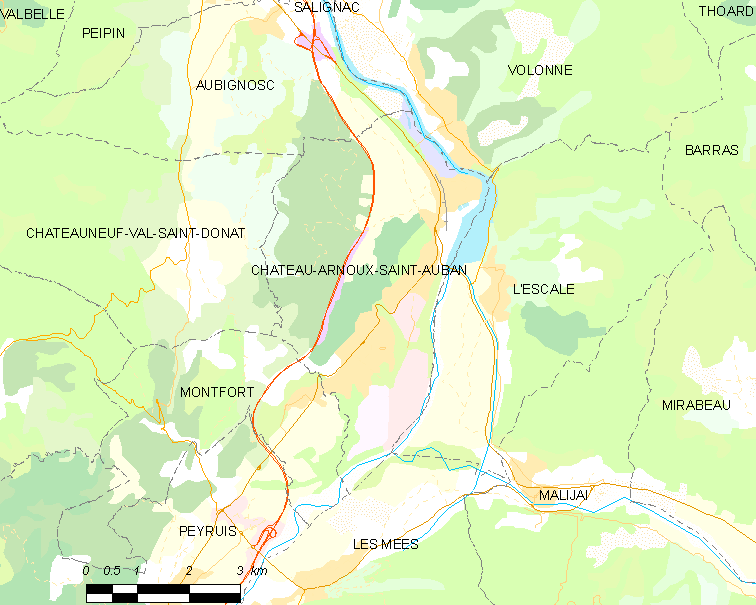
Château-Arnoux-Saint-Auban and surrounding districts

Château-Arnoux-Saint-Auban is on the river Durance.

Climate data for Château-Arnoux-Saint-Auban (1991–2020 normals)
Month	Jan	Feb	Mar	Apr	May	Jun	Jul	Aug	Sep	Oct	Nov	Dec	Year
Mean daily maximum °C (°F)	9.5 (49.1)	11.2 (52.2)	15.3 (59.5)	18.1 (64.6)	22.3 (72.1)	26.9 (80.4)	30.3 (86.5)	30.0 (86.0)	24.7 (76.5)	19.4 (66.9)	13.3 (55.9)	9.5 (49.1)	19.2 (66.6)
Mean daily minimum °C (°F)	0.2 (32.4)	0.3 (32.5)	3.1 (37.6)	5.8 (42.4)	9.7 (49.5)	13.4 (56.1)	15.8 (60.4)	15.7 (60.3)	12.1 (53.8)	8.6 (47.5)	4.1 (39.4)	0.9 (33.6)	7.5 (45.5)
Average precipitation mm (inches)	48 (1.9)	36 (1.4)	45 (1.8)	65 (2.6)	64 (2.5)	54 (2.1)	36 (1.4)	51 (2.0)	74 (2.9)	88 (3.5)	96 (3.8)	56 (2.2)	714 (28.1)
Mean monthly sunshine hours	168	183	230	228	263	303	342	312	249	196	157	149	2,779
Source: Meteo-Express

== Population ==
Its inhabitants are referred to as Jarlandins in French.

Historical population
Year	Pop.	±% p.a.
1968	6,532	—
1975	6,240	−0.65%
1982	5,576	−1.59%
1990	5,109	−1.09%
1999	4,970	−0.31%
2007	5,148	+0.44%
2012	5,184	+0.14%
2017	5,139	−0.17%
2023	5,107	−0.10%
Source: INSEE

== Sights ==
Château-Arnoux-Saint-Auban has one of the French pacifist monuments to the dead, which reads: "war is a crime".

The airfield is "Le Centre National de Vol à Voile", the French national centre for the sport of gliding.

== Education ==
A campus of the École nationale de l'aviation civile is located in the commune.

== See also ==
- Communes of the Alpes-de-Haute-Provence department
