= Géologique de Haute-Provence National Nature Reserve =

Regional nature reserve and fossil site in Provence-Alpes-Côte d'Azur, France

- IUCN category III (natural monument or feature)
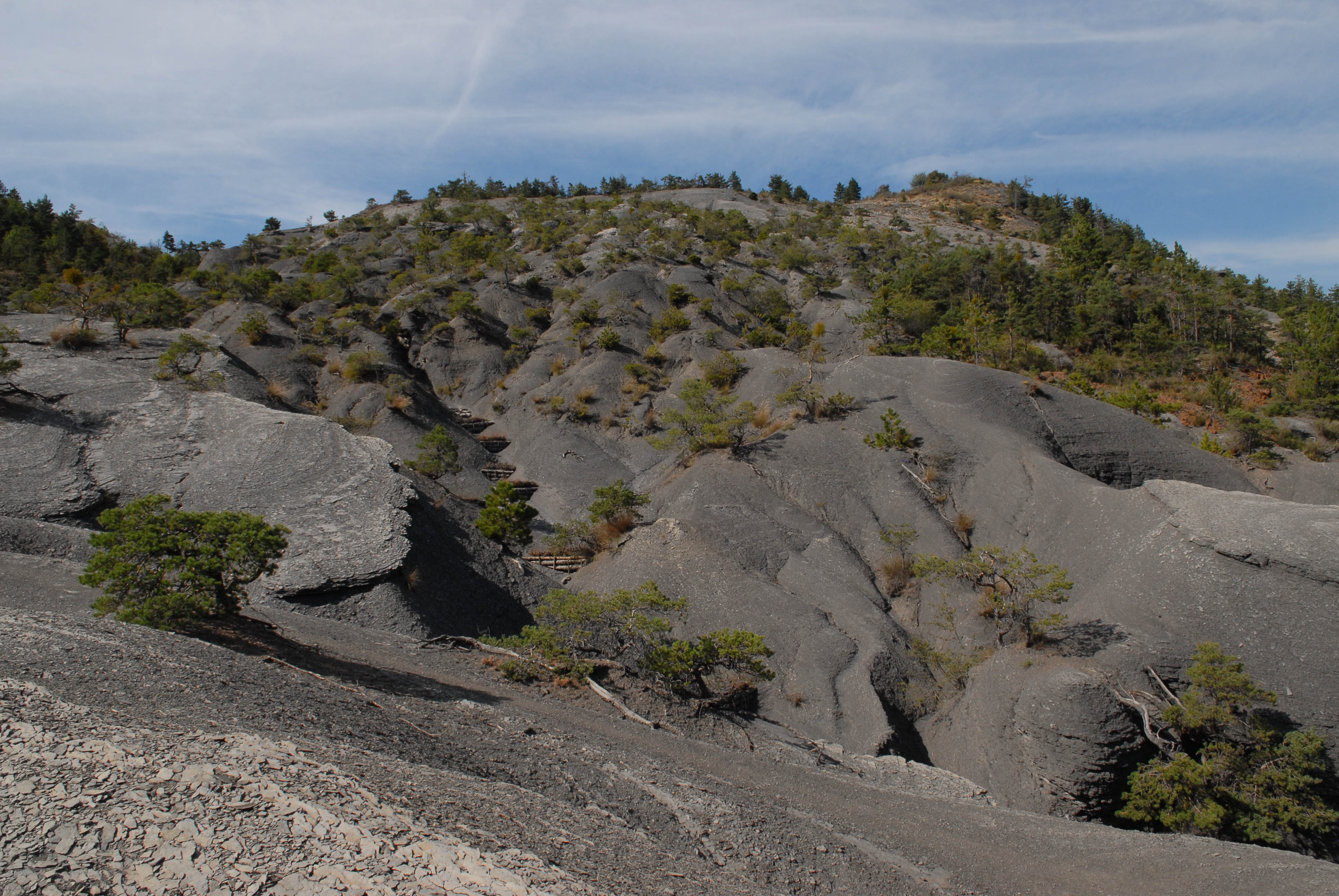
- Marl of the Adret de l'Escure
- Interactive map of Géologique de Haute-Provence National Nature Reserve
- Location: Alpes-de-Haute-Provence and Var, France
- Nearest city: Digne-les-Bains
- Coordinates: 44°4′41″N 6°18′21″E
- Area: 269 ha (660 acres)
- Established: 31 October 1984
- Governing body: Departmental Council of Alpes-de-Haute-Provence

Haute-Provence Geologic Formation
- Stratigraphic range: Sinemurian–Toarcian
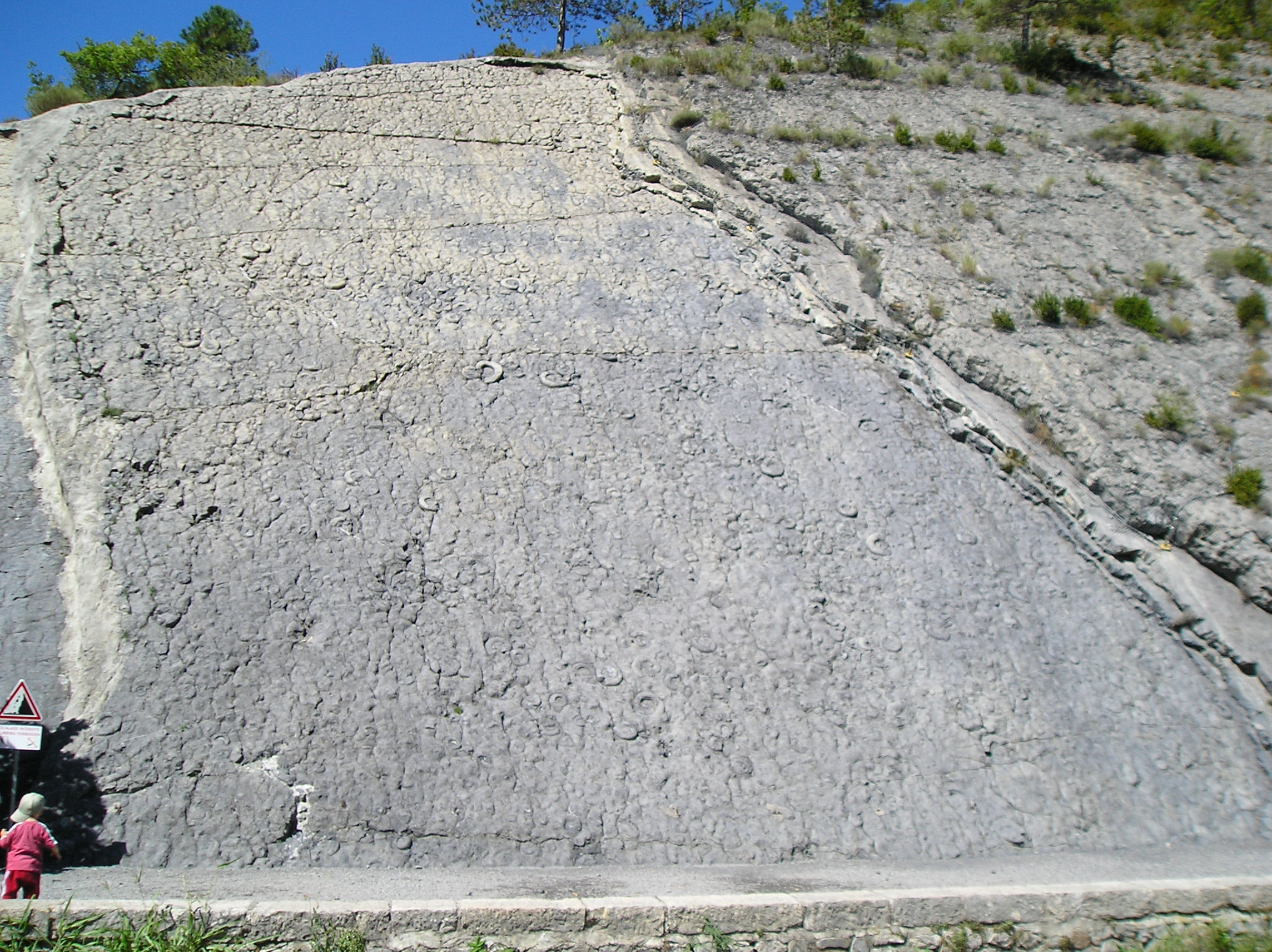
- Dalle à ammonites in Digne-les-Bains
- Type: Geologic formation

Location
- Coordinates: 44°4′41″N 6°18′21″E
- Region: Provence-Alpes-Côte d'Azur
- Country: France

Type section
- Named for: Haute-Provence
- Géologique de Haute-Provence National Nature Reserve (France)

The Géologique de Haute-Provence National Nature Reserve (RNN73) is a national nature reserve in Provence-Alpes-Côte d'Azur. Established in 1984, it covers 269.316 hectares (665.49 acres) across 18 sites in the Alpes-de-Haute-Provence and Var. Located between the Verdon and Durance rivers, it is an area designated for its landscape diversity, witness of the geological past of the Earth, and is the largest geological reserve in Europe.

== Location ==
The domain of the nature reserve spreads across 18 sites bearing fossils and outcrops with a total area of 269.316 hectares (665.49 acres), in the communes of Barles, Barrême, Chaudon-Norante, Clumanc, Digne-les-Bains, Entrages, Hautes-Duyes, La Javie, La Robine-sur-Galabre, Saint-Lions, Senez and Tartonne.

It is completed by a protection area which regulates fossil collections, spreading across 52 communes in the Alpes-de-Haute-Provence and 7 in Var. The total territory of the protected area covers more than 2,300 km^{2} (890 mi^{2}) and covers the communes of Aiglun, Angles, Archail, Authon, Auzet, Barles, Barras, Barrême, Beaujeu, Beynes, Blieux, Bras-d'Asse, Le Brusquet, Castellane, Le Castellard-Mélan, Le Chaffaut-Saint-Jurson, Champtercier, Châteauredon, Chaudon-Norante, Clumanc, Digne-les-Bains, Draix, Entrages, Estoublon, Hautes-Duyes, La Javie, Lambruisse, Majastres, Mallemoisson, Marcoux, Mézel, Mirabeau, Montclar, Moriez, Moustiers-Sainte-Marie, La Palud-sur-Verdon, Prads-Haute-Bléone, La Robine-sur-Galabre, Rougon, Saint-André-les-Alpes, Saint-Geniez, Saint-Jacques, Saint-Julien-d'Asse, Saint-Lions, Selonnet, Senez, Seyne, Tartonne, Thoard, Verdaches, Vergons and Le Vernet in Alpes-de-Haute-Provence and Bargème, Brenon, Le Bourguet, Châteauvieux, Comps-sur-Artuby, La Martre and Trigance in Var.

== History ==
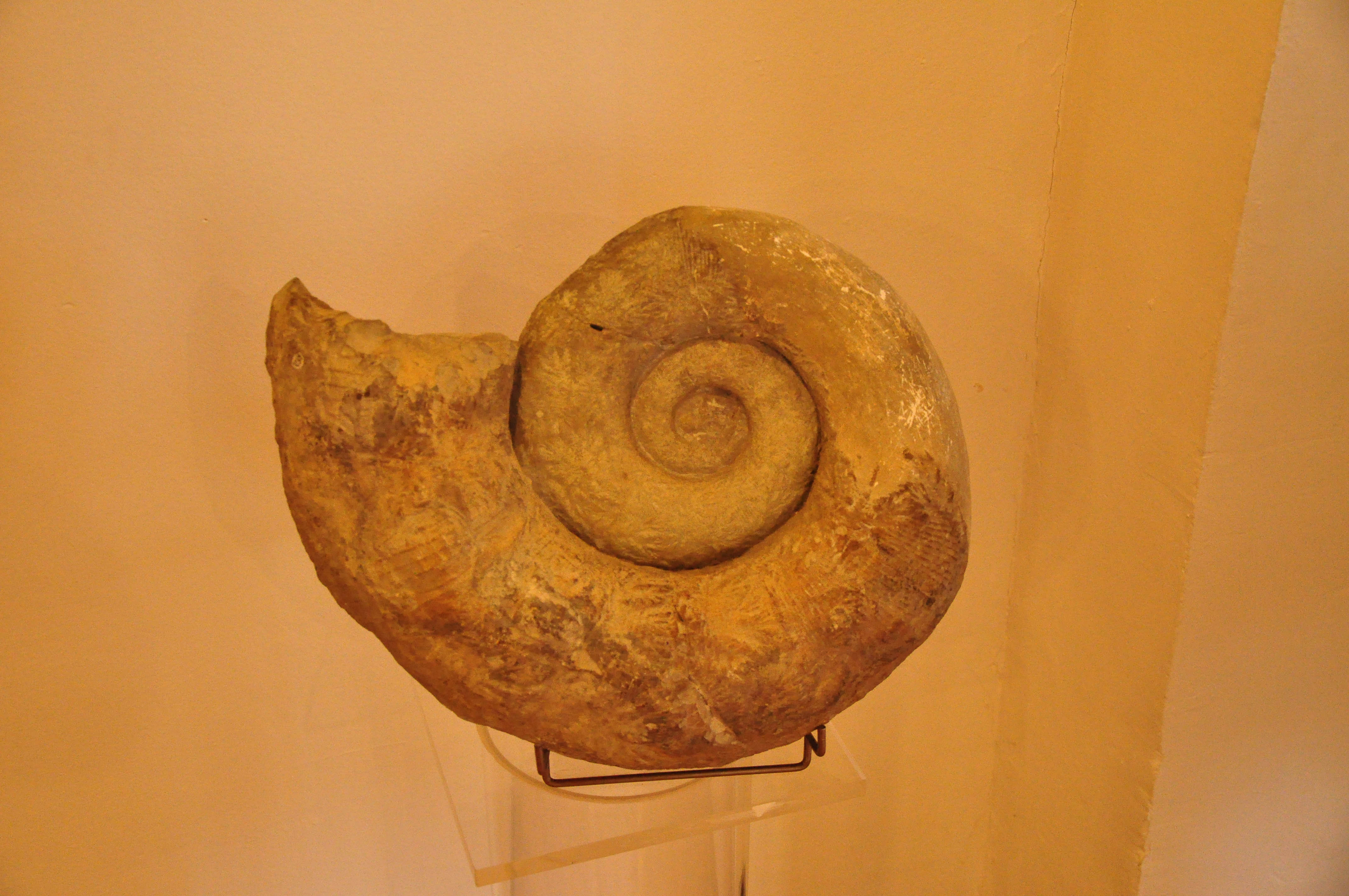
Ammonite from the Haute-Provence geological reserve showcased in the Digne-les-Bains museum

130 million years ago, giant ammonites more than one metre (3.3 ft) wide colonized the ocean that then covered this area of the Préalpes.

== Geologic patrimony ==
Those fossils can be discovered either in the Musée Promenade at Digne-les-Bains, or in situ in the folded and fractured layers of geological sites.

The most famous site is the Dalle à ammonites, on the RP 900 at 1.5 km (0.93 mi) north of Digne-les-Bains. With a 60° incline, it bears over 1,500 ammonites, 90% of which belong to the species Coroniceras multicostatum from the Sinemurian (Early Jurassic). Those ammonites could attain a diameter of 70 cm (28 in). Remains of nautilus, belemnites, Pecten and other bivalves can also be seen. The deposit thickness is estimated to be around 20 cm (7.9 in), laid down over a 100,000-year period.

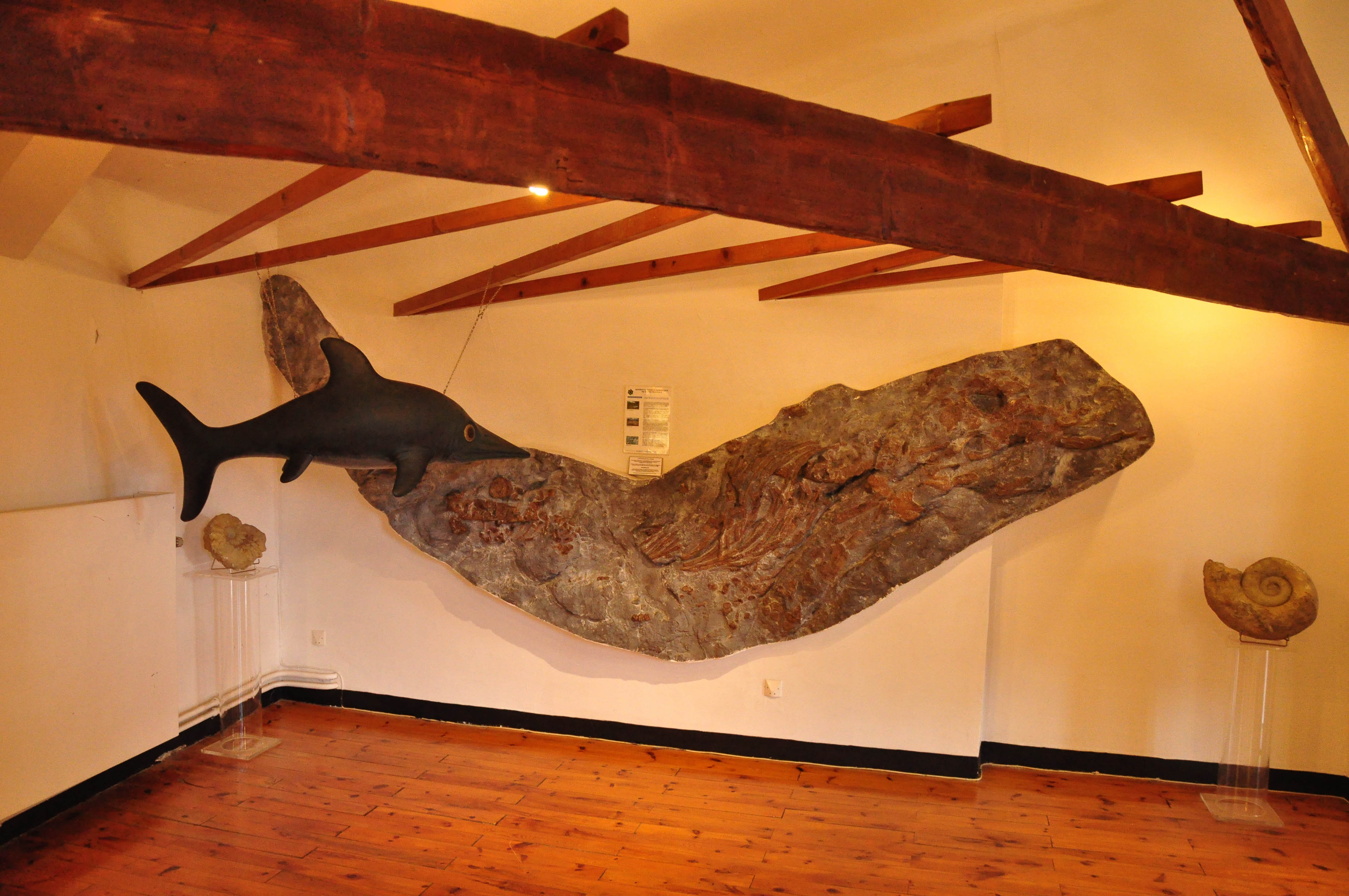
La Robine ichthyosaur

The La Robine ichthyosaur, displayed in the Digne museum, lived during the late Toarcian, 185 millions of years ago. This marine reptile was quickly buried, which limited its decomposition. Its conservation is due to paleogeographic conditions favouring the tilting of blocks, caused by the rifting following the opening of the Piemont-Liguria Ocean.

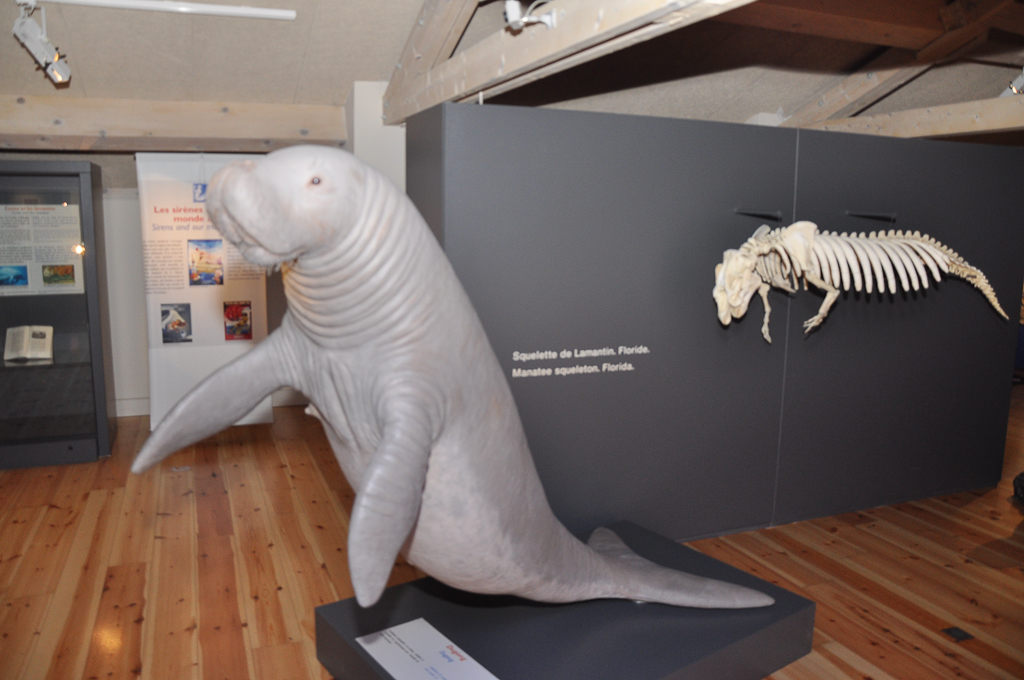
Castellane sirenian

At Castellane, the museum of the Maison Nature et Patrimoine takes visitors back for the last 40 millions of years. At that time a warm sea covered this part of the Alpes-de-Hautes-Provence and was populated with marine mammals such as sirenians. Also known as sea cows, as they mostly eat algae and aquatic plants, they gave birth to the ancient myth of mermaids.

Ammonites from the geological reserve

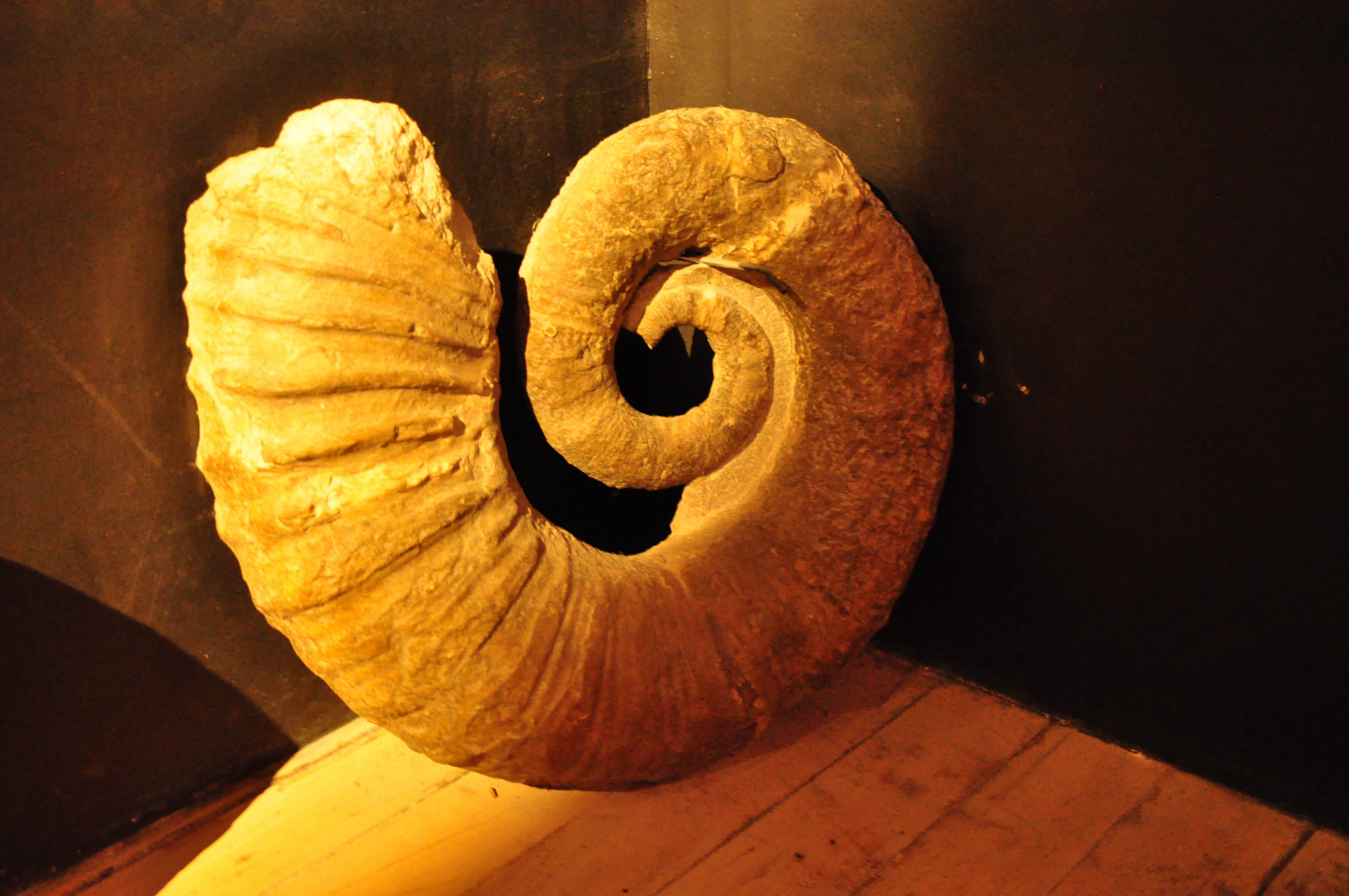
Arietites bucklandi

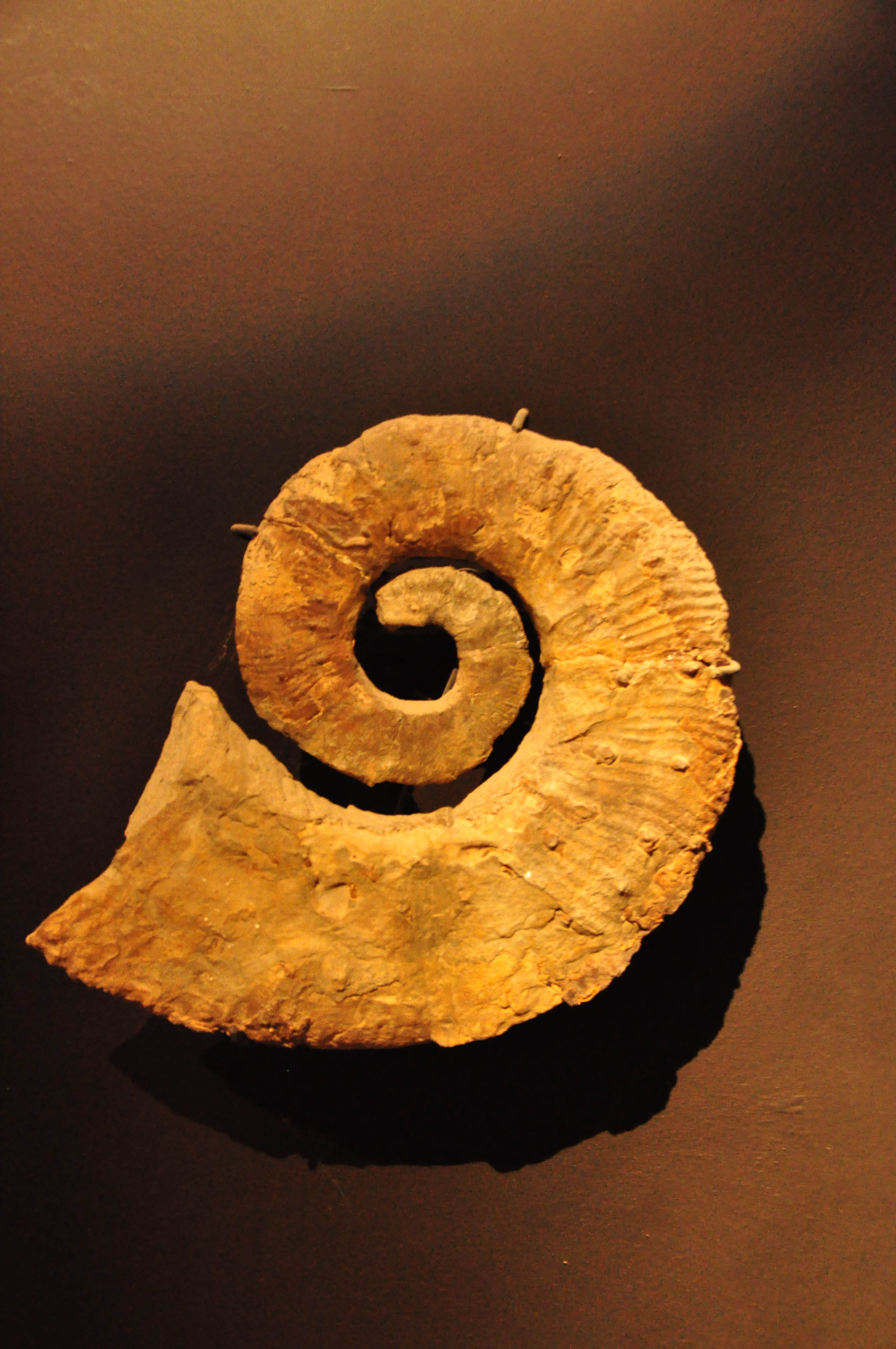

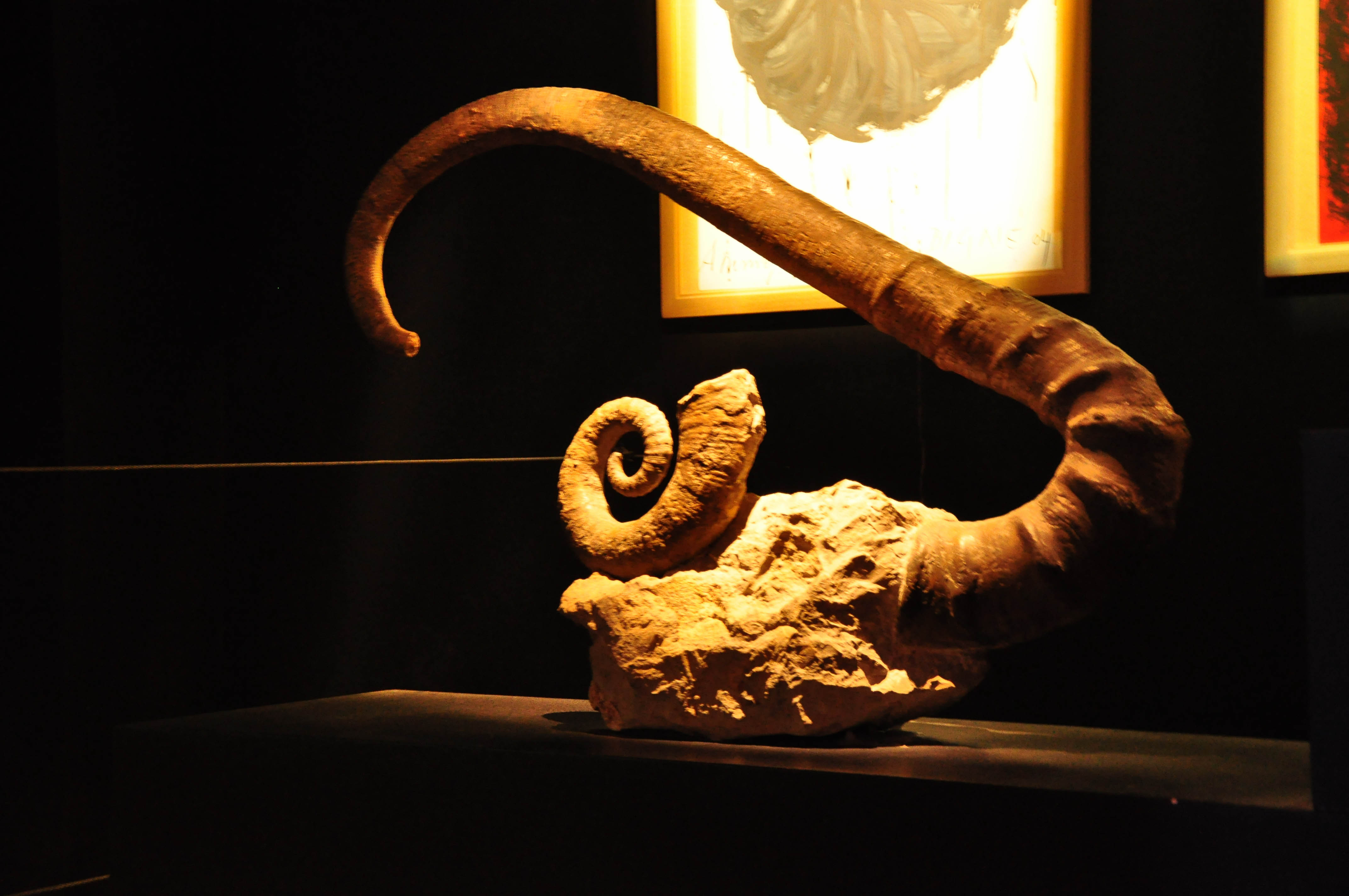
Arietites bucklandi

== Touristic and educational interest ==
The museum of Castellane, Sisteron and Digne-les-Bains offers marked discovery tours, accessible to anyone.

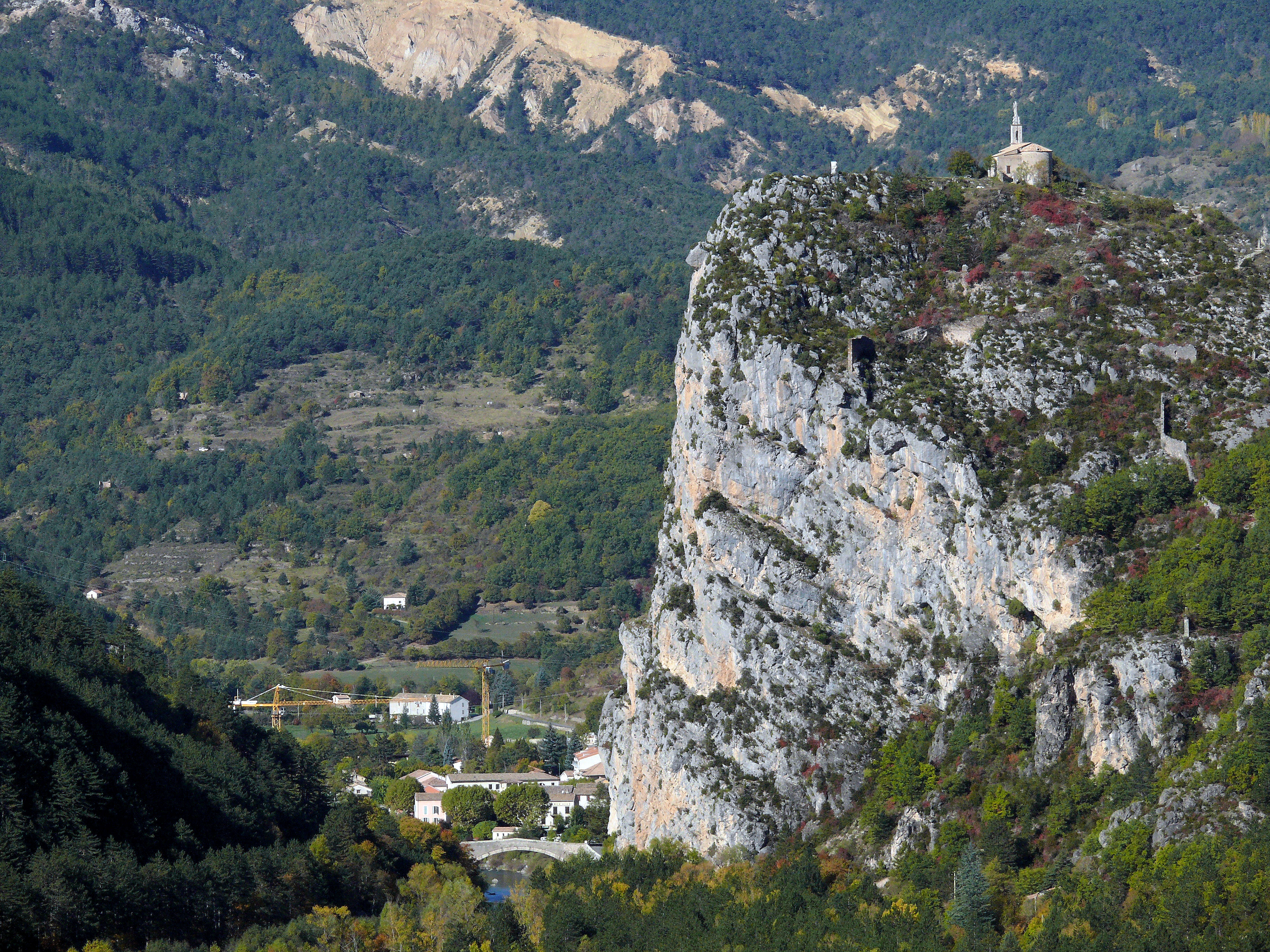
Roc de Castellane

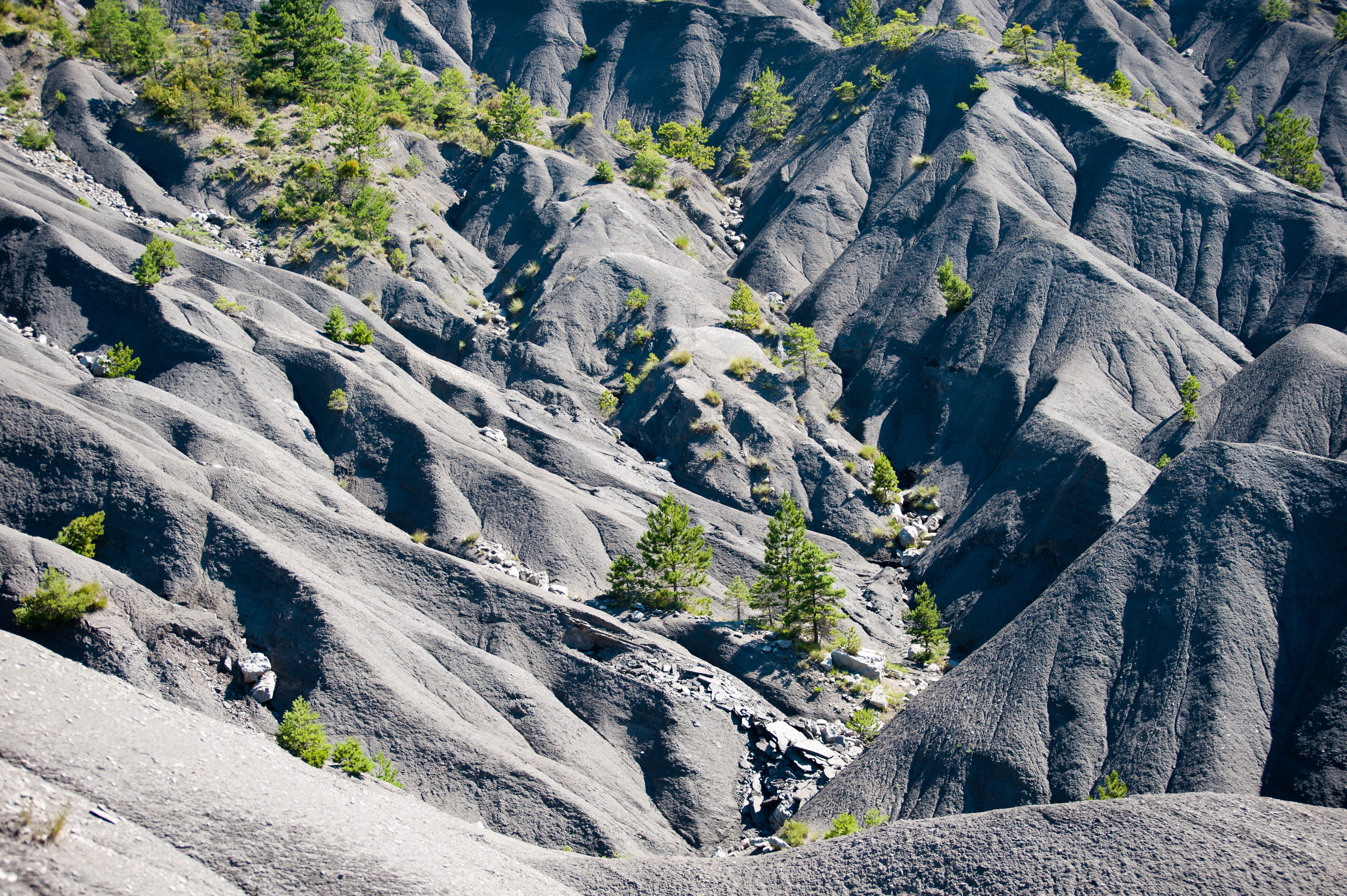
Adret de l'Escure in Digne-les-Bains

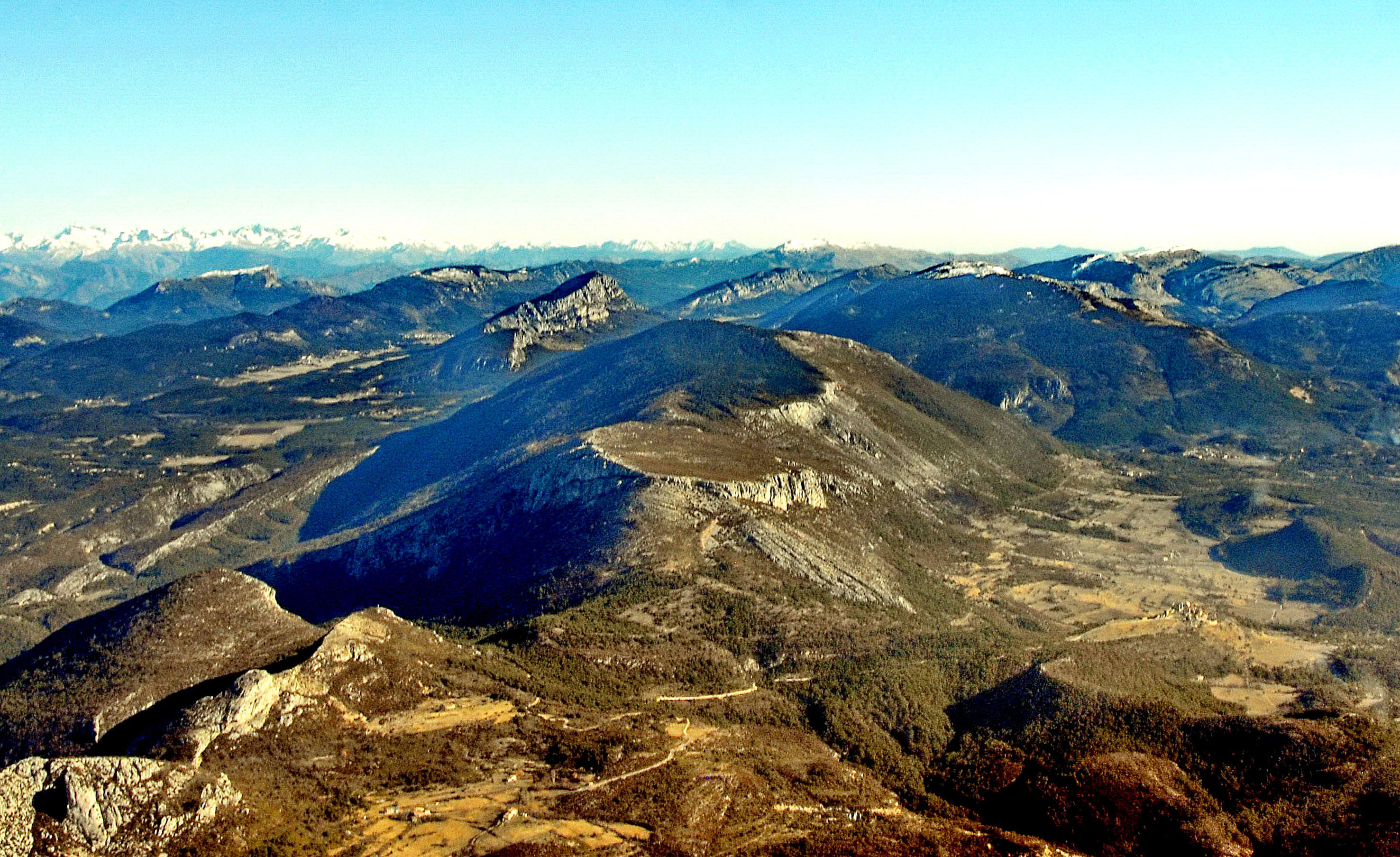
Montagne du Brouis in Bargème

== Administration, management plan, regulations ==
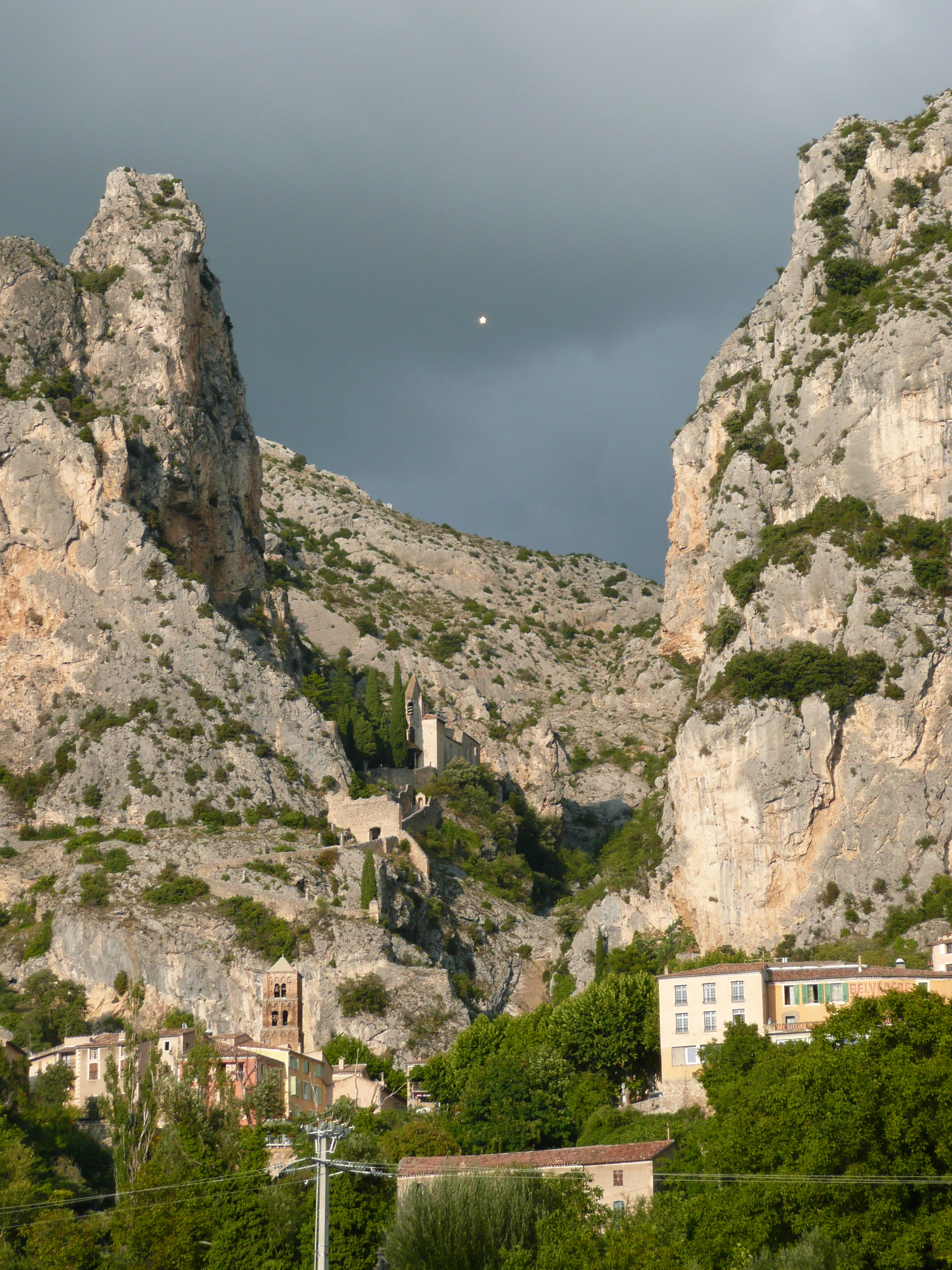
Moustiers-Sainte-Marie

Once managed by the Association pour la gestion de la réserve géologique de Haute Provence, established in 1984, the nature reserve is now under the management of the Departmental Council of Alpes-de-Haute-Provence.

Regulations forbid the collection and extraction of any fossils. The collection of naturally released fossils is tolerated, but only in limited quantities. It is designated as a UNESCO Global Geopark, in the Global Geoparks Network, and it was one of the four founding members of the European Geoparks Network.

=== Tools and legal status ===
The nature reserve was established under a decree dated 31 October 1984.
