= Canton of Barrême =

Coordinates: 43°57′15″N 6°22′07″E

Barrême
- Former canton
- Interactive map of Barrême
- Country: France
- Region: Provence-Alpes-Côte d'Azur
- Department: Alpes-de-Haute-Provence
- No. of communes: {{{nbcomm}}}
- Disbanded: 2015
- Area: 316.37 km^{2} (122.15 sq mi)
- Population (2012): 1,270
  - Density: 4.01/km^{2} (10.4/sq mi)

The canton of Barrême is a former administrative division in southeastern France. It was disbanded following the French canton reorganisation which came into effect in March 2015. It consisted of 8 communes, which joined the canton of Riez in 2015. It had 1,270 inhabitants (2012).

The canton comprised the following communes:

- Barrême
- Blieux
- Chaudon-Norante
- Clumanc
- Saint-Jacques
- Saint-Lions
- Senez
- Tartonne

== Demographics ==
Historical population Canton of Barrême
Year	1962	1968	1975	1982	1990	1999
Pop.	1,091	1,183	979	1,004	1,110	1,119
±%	—	+8.4%	−17.2%	+2.6%	+10.6%	+0.8%
From the year 1962 on: No double counting – residents of multiple communes (e.g. students and military personnel) are counted only once. Source: INSEE

== See also ==
- Cantons of the Alpes-de-Haute-Provence department
