= Dalle à ammonites =

French fossil site

- Stratigraphic range: Sinemurian
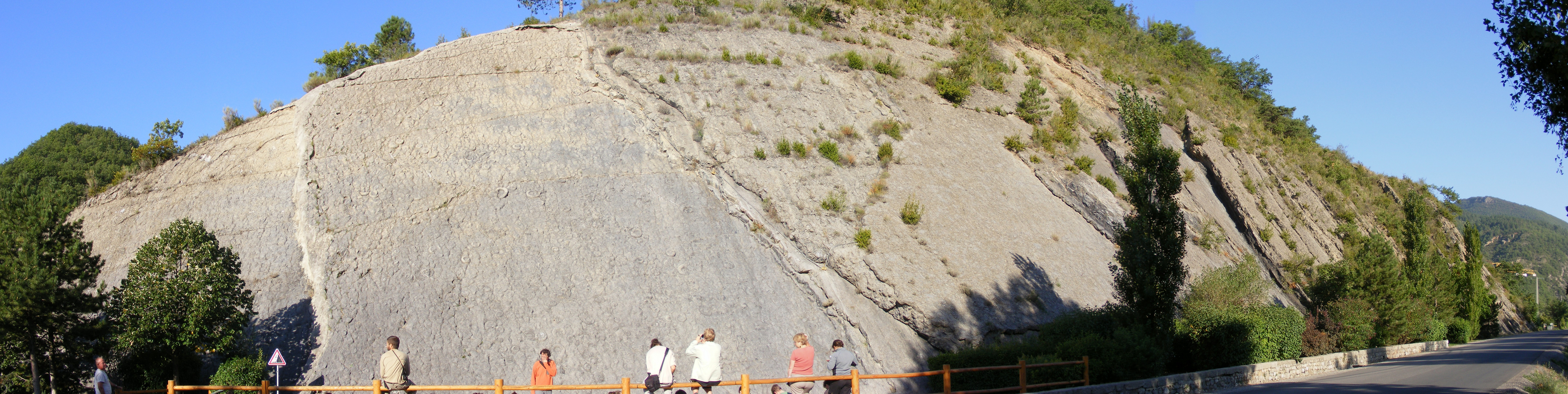
- Dalle à ammonites in Digne-les-Bains
- Type: Fossil site
- Thickness: 20 cm

Lithology
- Primary: Grey limestone

Location
- Coordinates: 44°7′10″N 6°14′3″E
- Region: Provence-Alpes-Côte d'Azur
- Country: France

Type section
- Named for: Ammonite
- Dalle à ammonites (France)

The Dalle à ammonites (or Dalle aux ammonites) at Digne-les-Bains (Alpes-de-Haute-Provence) is a remarkable natural site consisting of a rock strata bearing a large number of fossilized ammonites. This site is located approximately 1.5 kilometres (0.93 mi) south of Digne-les-Bains from Barles road. It is part of the Géologique de Haute-Provence National Nature Reserve.

The slab, inclined at 60°, is made of grey limestone. It bears around 1,500 ammonites, 90% of which belonging to the species Coroniceras multicostatum, dating from the Sinemurian (Early Jurassic). Those ammonites can attain a diameter of 70 centimetres (28 in).

Nautiloids, belemnites, Pecten seashells and other bivalves can also be found in the deposit.

The deposit thickness is estimated to be 20 centimetres (7.9 in), deposited over a 100,000-year period.

== Slab history ==
As well known as it is, the slab wasn't known until recently : Alcide d'Orbigny, who prospected the area in the middle of the 19th century, doesn't mention it. Geologists studying the ichthyosaur remains near the site only mentions numerous species of ammonites and other molluscs.

The dalle is thought to have been partially unearthed for the first time in June 1941, during road works on what is now the D 900A. In 1979, before the establishment of the Géologique de Haute-Provence National Nature Reserve, earthworks began to uncover the slab and unearthed 600 ammonites over 160 square metres (1,700 sq ft).

Until 1994 only 200 square metres (2,200 sq ft) were visible. After this date, the Géologique de Haute-Provence National Nature Reserve took the task of clearing an additional 150 square metres (1,600 sq ft) to attain a total area of 350 square metres (3,800 sq ft).

The 160 square metres (1,700 sq ft) already unearthed in 1992 of the slab were molded in 1992 by the geological reserve for the city of Kamaishi in Japan (who desired to buy the original). The mold was realized in 30 parts, which were sent and reassembled in Japan.

== Geological aspect ==
=== Similar sites ===
An almost horizontal Ammonoidea slab, from the Triassic or the Jurassic, is located below Fressac bridge over the Conturby river in Gard.

=== Geodynamic context ===
The Dalle à ammonites was created during the Alpine orogeny. The Dignes-les-Bains area is located in the French Prealps, in the Dauphinois geological facies. It bears the traces of the oceanisation preceding the orogeny beginning.

The Alps were erected in several phases, after a subduction happened in the paleo-ocean Tethys. The Dalle à ammonites, as well as other sites in the area, are witnesses of the first step of this process, and of what was life in this ocean before the apparition of the mountains. They bring paleontological context for the understanding of paleoenvironments and period conditions.

=== Paleontological analysis ===
The fossils aspect helps to understand the sedimentation process. The good conservation of the shells give informations over the marine dynamism responsible for the deposit conditions: a hectic environment, like a beach or a coast, were the waves actions were strongly felt, with a tendency to break the shells, leading to fragmentary deposits, settled as faluns or lumachella. The majority of the fossils on the slab are still almost complete, which lead to the hypothesis of a milder environment, deeper, and better preserved. Moreover, this deposit was effected over the carbonate compensation depth, and hence at an average depth.

The tapophenosis analysis, as well as the position of the shells, lead to the conclusion that the Dalle à ammonites was an accumulation facies: a large number of dead animals were carried by weak marine currents, towards their deposit site. Traces of bioturbation can be attributed to the benthic fauna, such as scavenger worms, who thrived in this biotope.

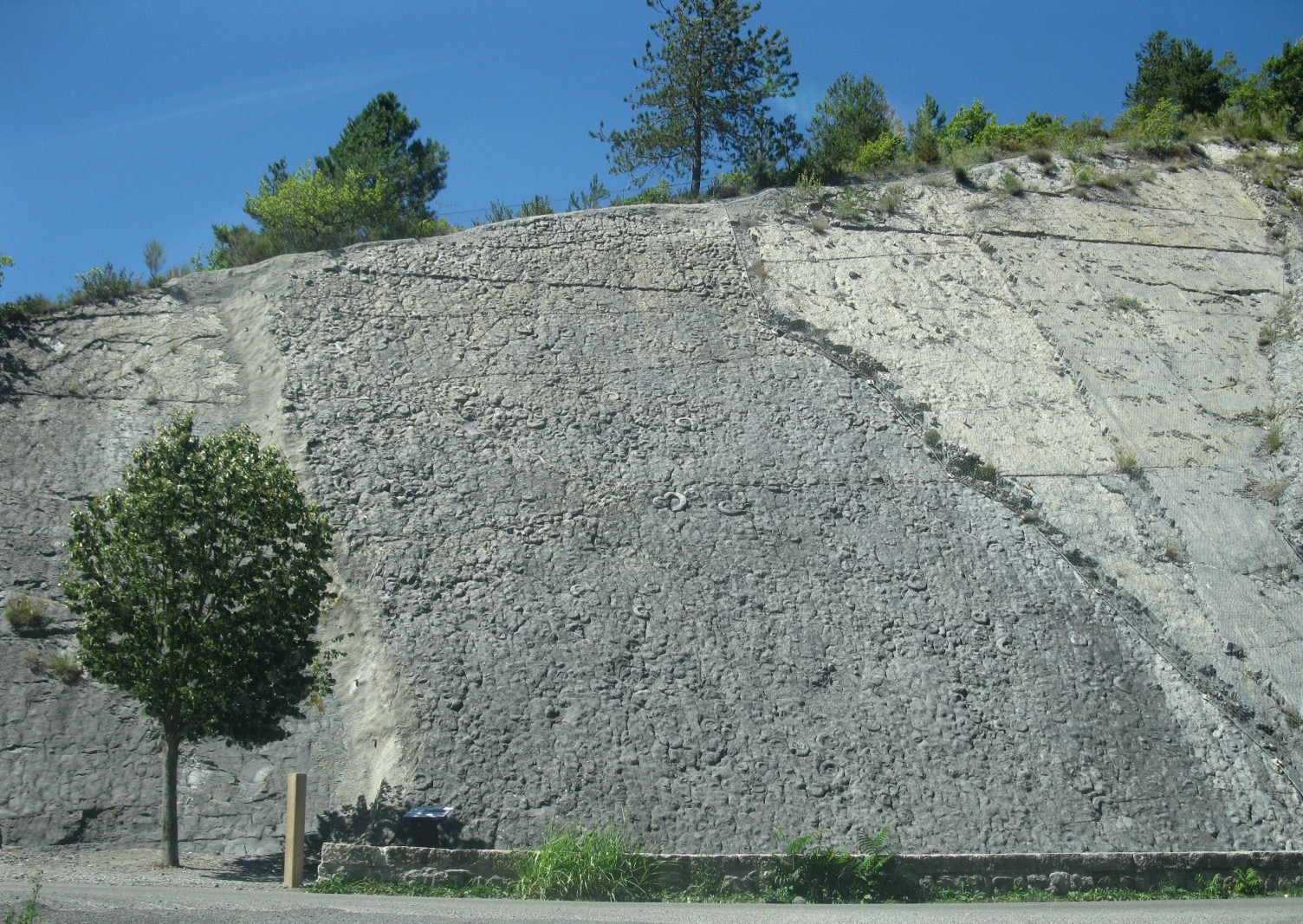
Fossil-bearing strata

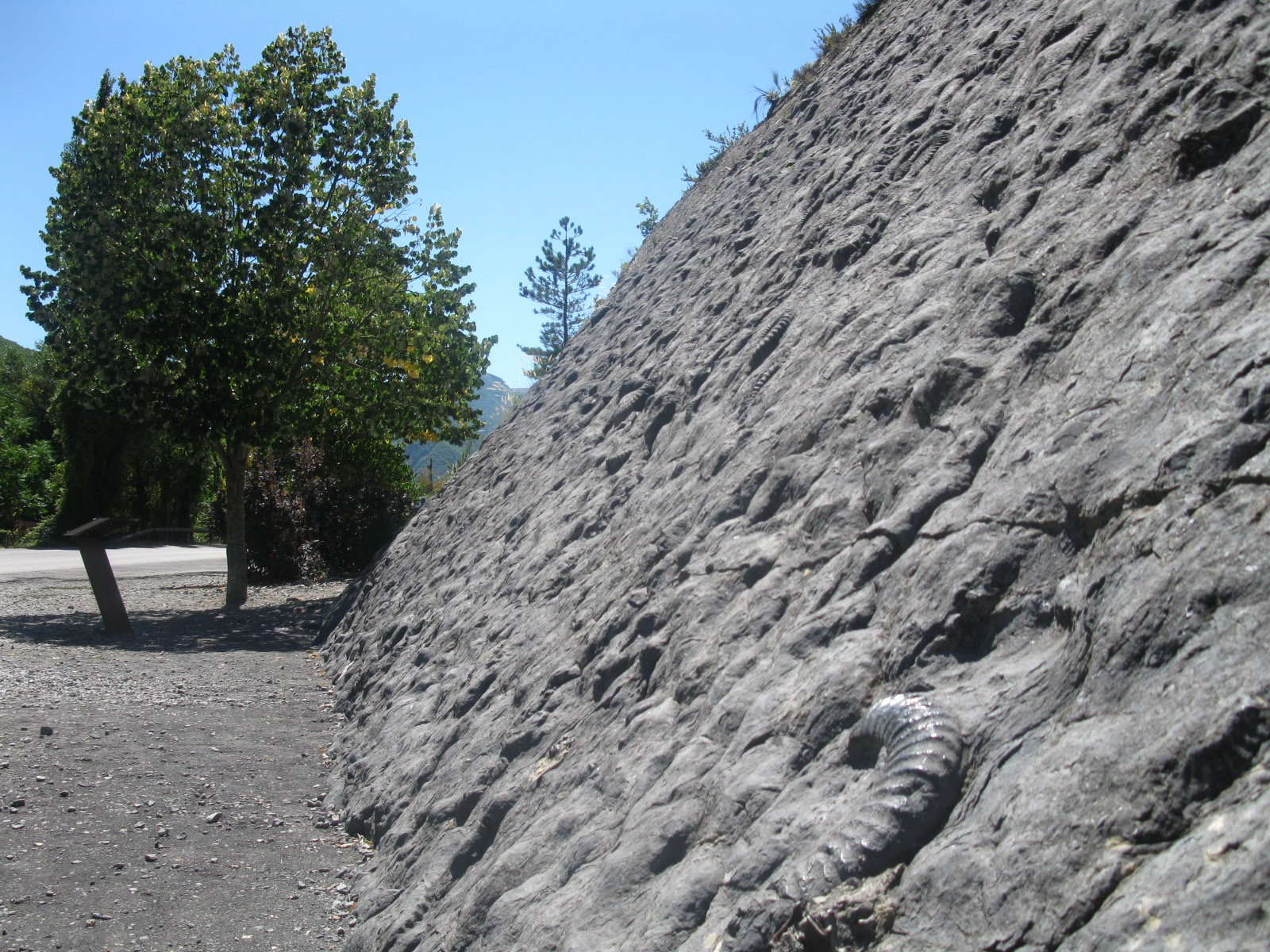
Inclination, from the South

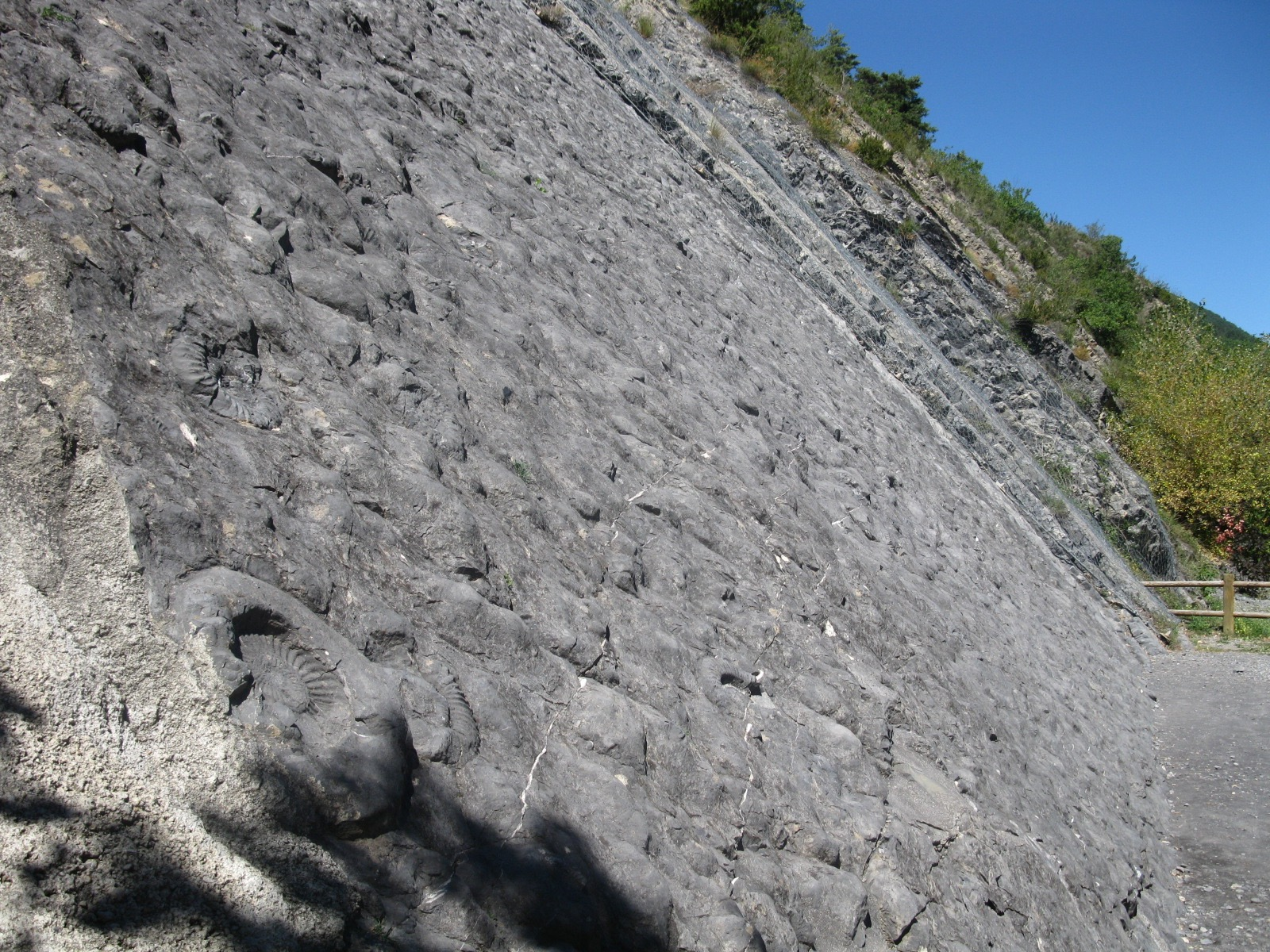
Inclination, from the North

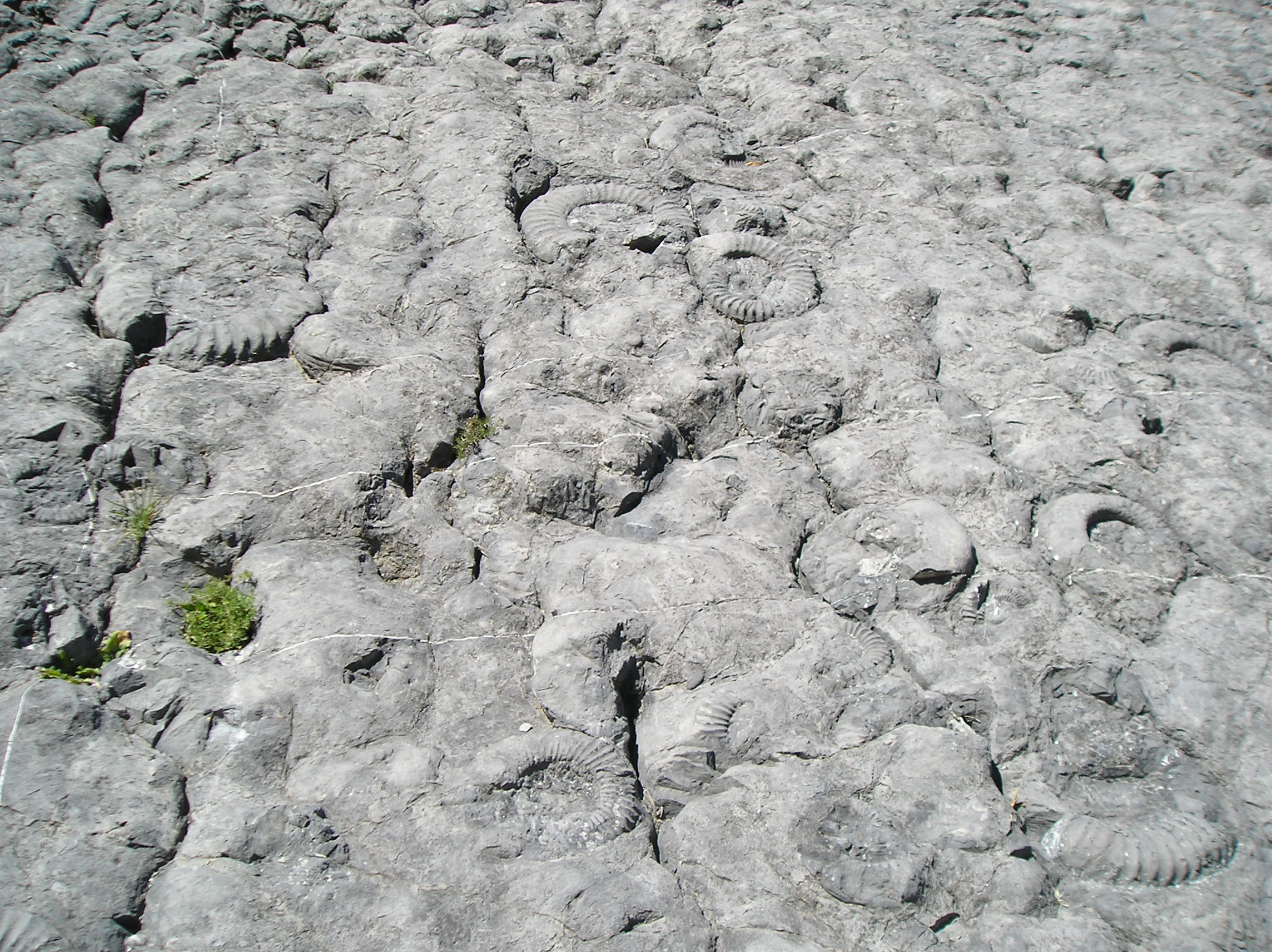
Détails

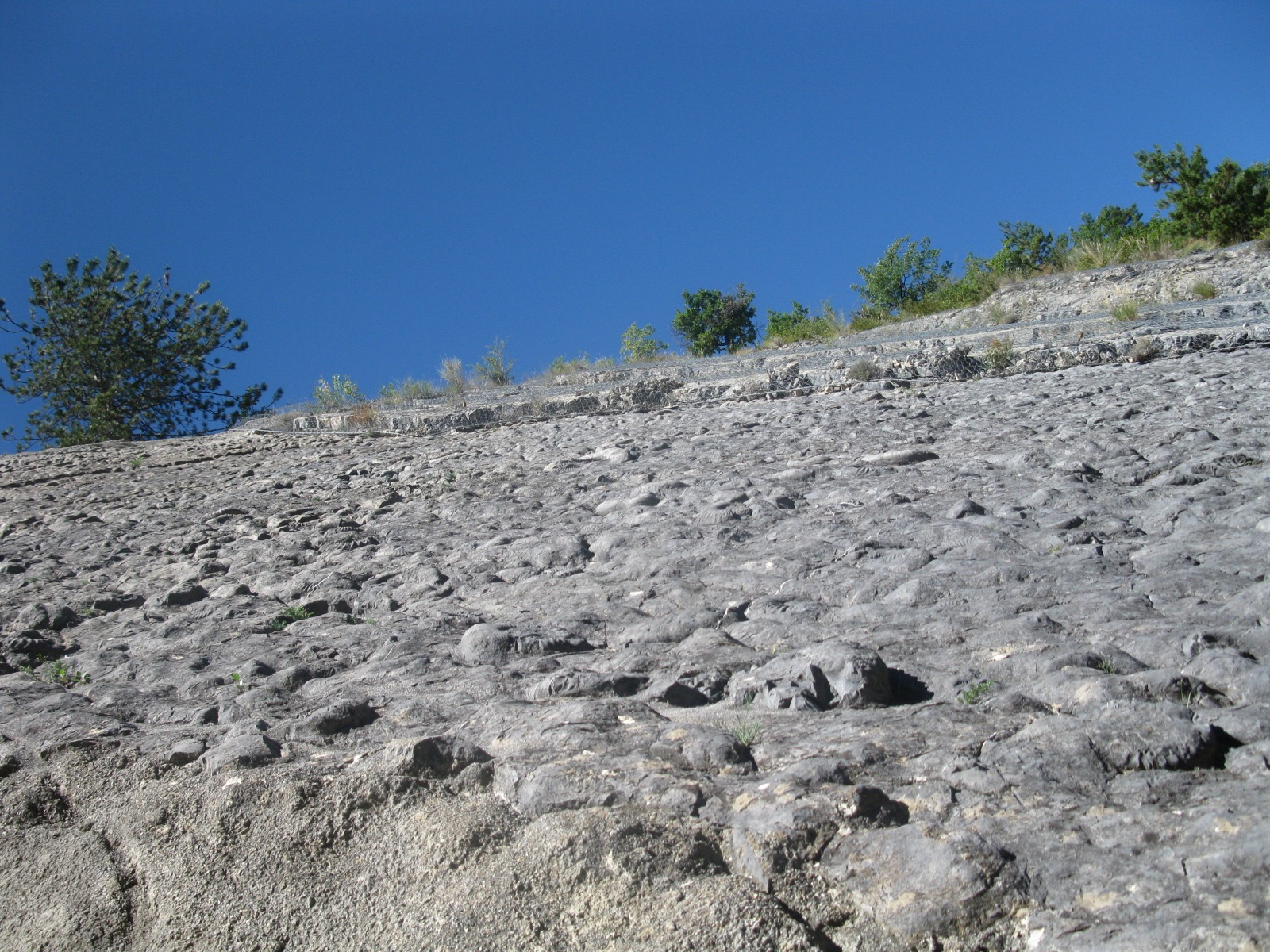
Details

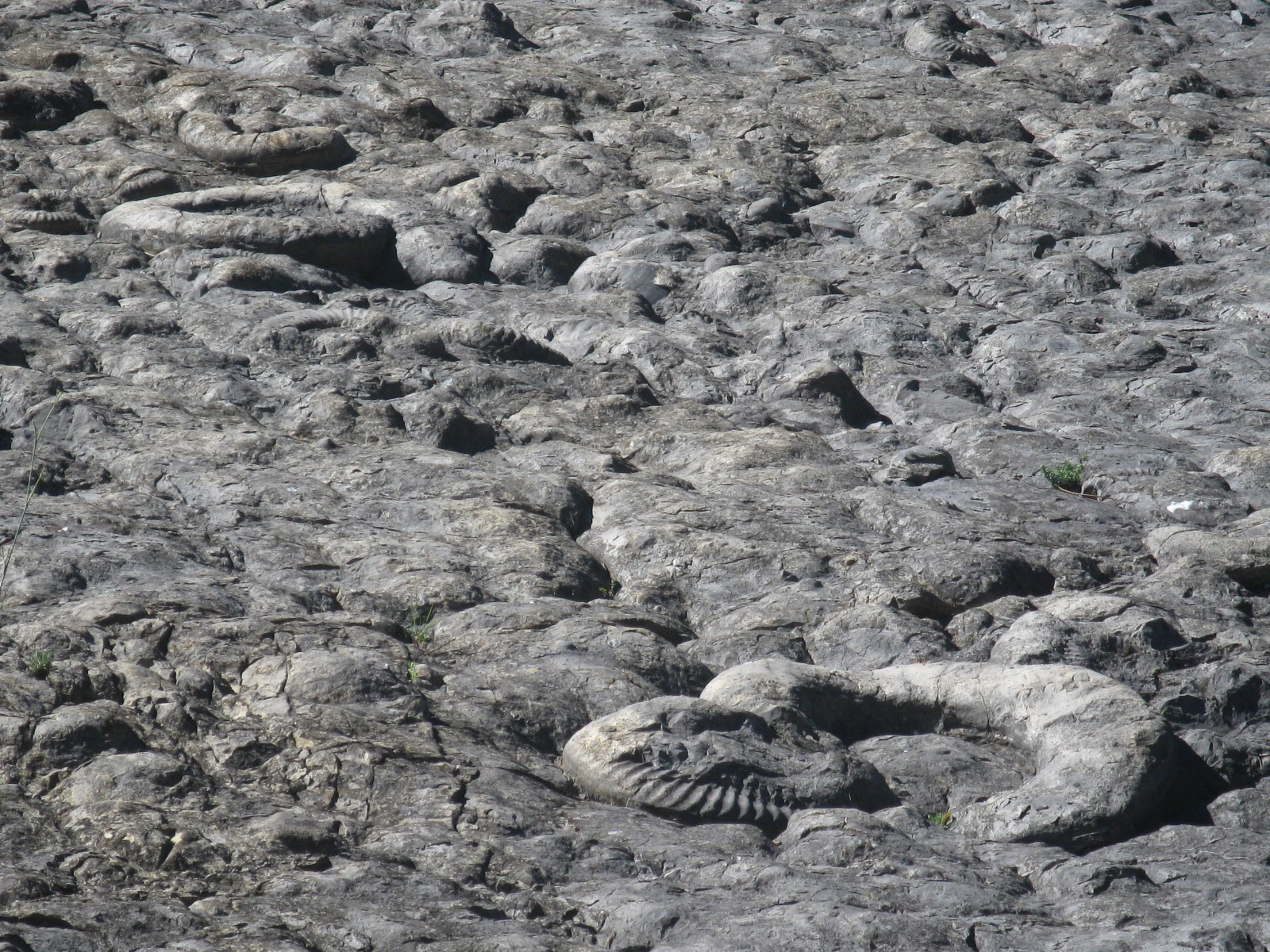
Details

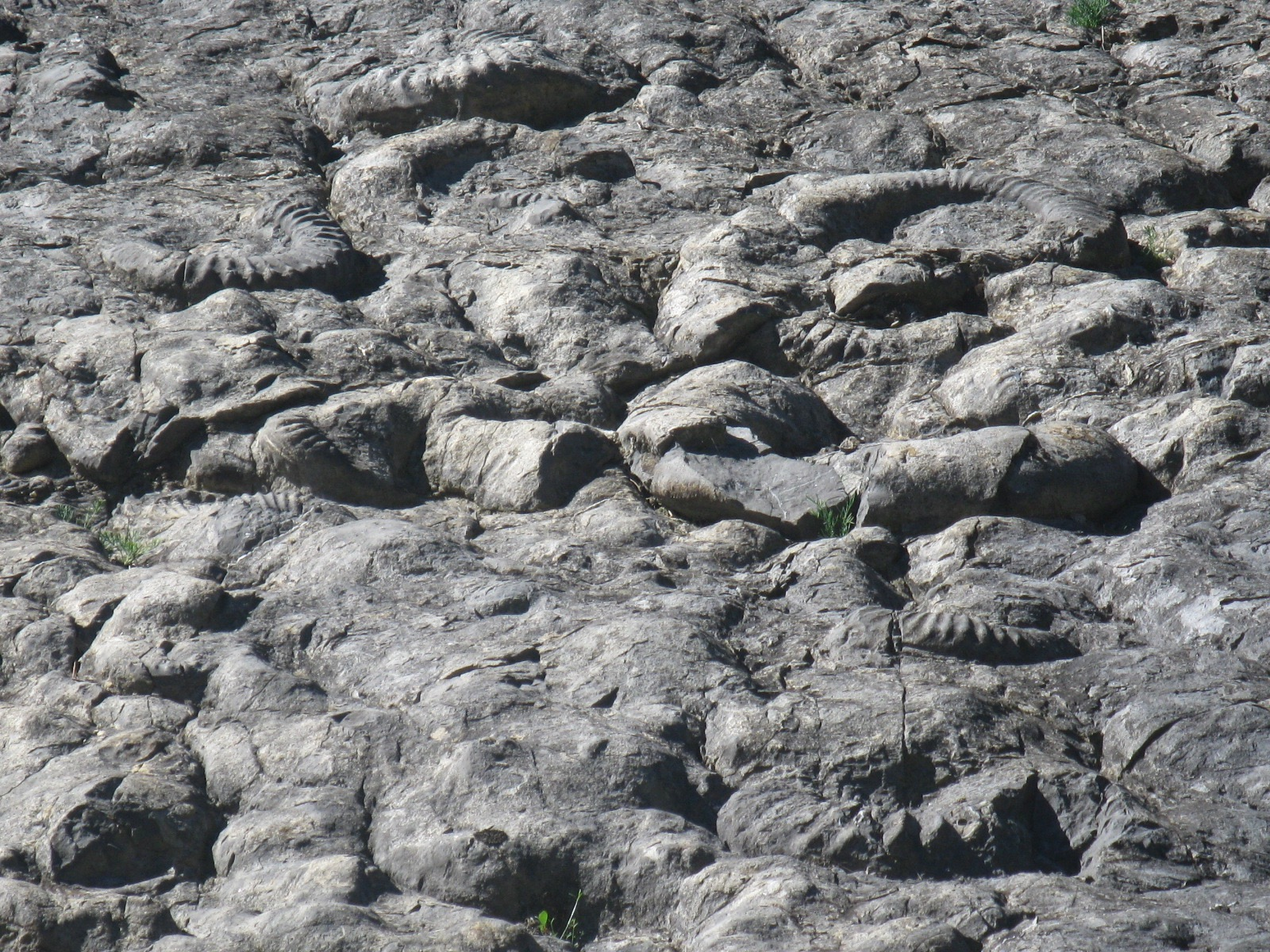
Details
