= Departmental Council of Alpes-de-Haute-Provence =

The Departmental Council of Alpes-de-Haute-Provence (French: Conseil Départemental des Alpes de Haute-Provence, Occitan: Conselh Departamental deis Aups de Provença Auta) is the deliberative assembly of the Alpes-de-Haute-Provence department in the region of Provence-Alpes-Côte d'Azur. It consists of 30 members (general councilors) from 15 cantons.

The President of the General Council is Éliane Barreille.

== Vice-Presidents ==
The President of the Departmental Council is assisted by 9 vice-presidents chosen from among the departmental advisers. Each of them has a delegation of authority.

List of vice-presidents of the Alpes-de-Haute-Provence Departmental Council (as of 2021)
Order	Name	Party	Canton
1st	Jacques Bres	LR	Manosque-1
2nd	Magali Surle-Girieud	LR	Castellane
3rd	Michal Dalmasso	LR	Forcalquier
4th	Stéphanie Colombero	LR	Manosque-1
5th	Robert Gay	LR	Sisteron
6th	Sandra Raponi	LR	Digne-les-Bains-2
7th	Jean-Michel Tron	LR	Barcelonnette
8th	Marion Magnan	LR	Manosque-3
9th	Marcel Gossa	LR	Valensole

== Current Composition ==
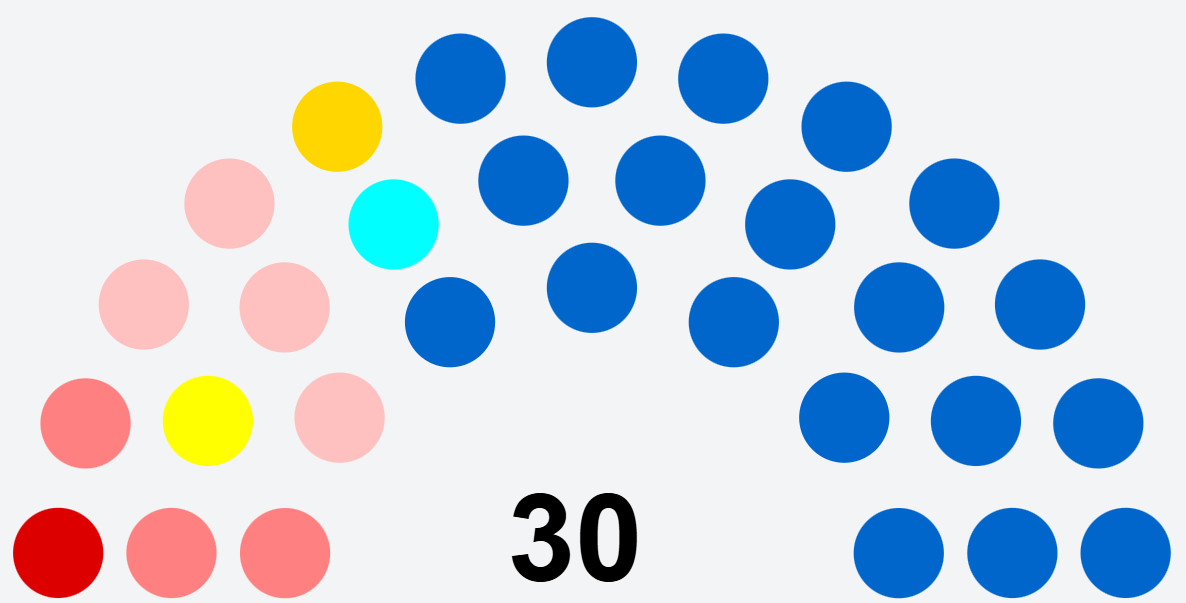

PCF - 1 seat

PS - 3 seats

PRG - 1 seat

Miscellaneous left - 4 seats

RE - 1 seat

UDI - 1 seat

LR - 19 seats

== See also ==
- Alpes-de-Haute-Provence
- General councils of France
