= Tartonne =

Commune in southeastern France

- Commune
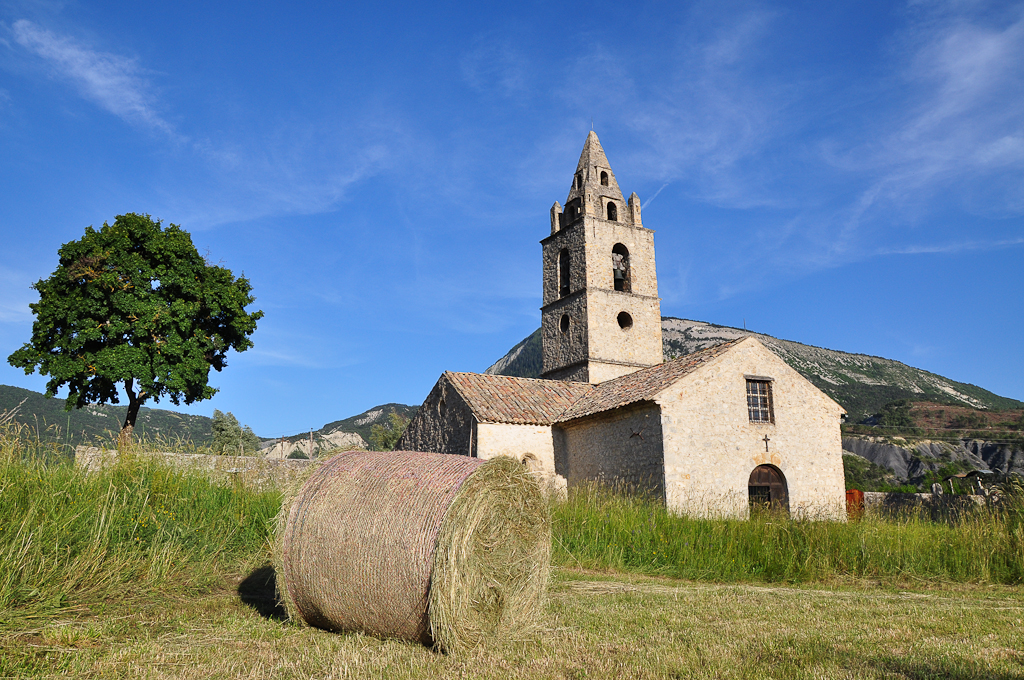
- The church in Tartonne

- Coat of arms
- Location of Tartonne
- Location within France Location within Provence-Alpes-Côte d'Azur
- Coordinates: 44°04′15″N 6°23′20″E
- Country: France
- Region: Provence-Alpes-Côte d'Azur
- Department: Alpes-de-Haute-Provence
- Arrondissement: Castellane
- Canton: Riez
- Intercommunality: Alpes Provence Verdon-Sources de Lumière

Government
  - Mayor (2026–32): Hugues Chaillan
- Area^{1}: 44.88 km^{2} (17.33 sq mi)
- Elevation: 945 m (3,100 ft)
- Highest elevation: 2,285 m (7,497 ft)
- Lowest elevation: 879 m (2,884 ft)
- Population (2023): 127
  - Density: 2.83/km^{2} (7.33/sq mi)
- Time zone: UTC+01:00 (CET)
  - Summer (DST): UTC+02:00 (CEST)
- INSEE/Postal code: 04214 /04330
- ^{1} French Land Register data, which excludes lakes, ponds, glaciers > 1 km^{2} (0.386 sq mi or 247 acres) and river estuaries.

Tartonne (French pronunciation: [taʁtɔn]; Occitan: Tartona) is a commune in the Alpes-de-Haute-Provence department in southeastern France.

The name of the inhabitants is Tartonnais.

== Geography ==
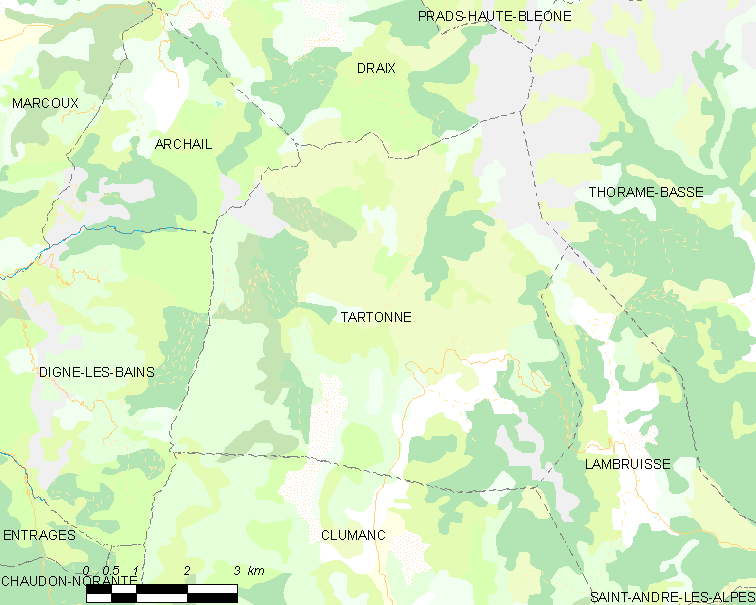
Tartonne and neighboring municipalities

=== Site and climate ===
The village of Tartonne is located bottom of Valley, 945 metres (3,100 ft) altitude, greatly influencing the climate; the differences of temperatures on the same day are very important: in 2004, the mean amplitude of temperature was 27 °C.

The landscape is marked by robine, a sedimentary rock of black color which is very soft and crumbly to air, but which is very strong in the subsoil.

=== Hydrography ===
The river Asse de Clumanc has its source in the north of the commune.

=== Environment ===
The commune has 200 hectares (490 acres) of woods and forests, though only 4.5% of its area.

=== Habitat and hamlets ===
Like its neighbour Clumanc, Tartonne does not correspond to a specific agglomeration, which is quite unusual. The habitat is very dispersed, and one can distinguish five groups of hamlets which are very distant from each other (up to 10 km):

- Petit Défend at 850 metres (2,790 ft) altitude
- Plan-de-Chaude, the main hamlet at 975 metres (3,199 ft) which constitutes the headquarters with the town hall
- Maladrech at 950 metres (3,120 ft)
- Le Viable, Les Thourons and Les Laugiers, all at 1,075–1,200 metres (3,527–3,937 ft)
- Sauzeries-Hautes and Sauzeries-Basses at 800–1,050 metres (2,620–3,440 ft)
- La Pène or La Peine at 1,100 metres (3,600 ft)

This distance is due to the poverty of the soil, and the difficulty of building: the strong gradients, the presence of numerous watercourses, and the instability of the land, means that more than 85% of the territory of the commune is unbuildable.

=== Major hazards ===
None of the 200 communes of the Department is in the zero seismic risk zone. Tartonne is in zone 1b (low seismicity) according to the deterministic classification of 1991, based on the historical earthquakes, and in zone 4 (medium risk) according to the EC8 probabilistic classification of 2011. The municipality of Tartonne is also exposed to three other natural risks:

- Forest fire
- Flooding
- Land movement: several slopes of the municipality are covered by a medium to high hazard

The municipality of Tartonne is exposed to any of the risks of technological origin identified by the prefecture and a foreseeable natural risk prevention plan (PPR) for the district exists; the DICRIM has existed since 2011.

The commune was subject to orders of disaster for flooding and mudslides of mud in 1994 and 2011.

=== Toponymy ===
The name of the locality (Tortona in 1199, Tartona in 1200), would be formed on the pre-Celtic root *Tortona, of unknown origin and meaning according to Ernest Nègre, though according to Charles Rostaing rooted in *Tar, designating stone and by the Fénie couple in an oronym (mountain toponym). Negre is disputed by Raymond Sindou, who considers unlikely a lack of change of the name for 1,500 years, and offers a comparison, without a sense of moving forward, Tortona to Dertosa in Hispania Tarraconensis and Dertona in Cisalpine Gaul.

The name of the Summit of Cucuyon at 1,886 metres (6,188 ft), is formed on the pre-Celtic root *Kug-, another oronym, with repetition and addition of a diminutive suffix.

== History ==
=== Antiquity ===
The first traces of occupation date back to the Gallo-Roman at the current location of the hamlet of Petit Defend. Augustus made the conquest of the Asses Valley, while that of the Alps he completed in 14 BC. It is difficult to know the name of the Gallic tribe that inhabited the valley, and the name of the civitas which Tartonne depended on in the early Empire: Eturamina (Thorame) or Sanitensium (Senez). At the end of the Roman Empire, the connection to that of Sanitensium, and its diocese, was proved with the disappearance of the bishopric of Thorame.

=== Middle Ages ===
The two communities, La Peine and Tartonne, were reported in charters in the 13th century. In 1342, the two communities of Tartonne and La Peine are attached to the Viguerie of Castellane by the Comte of Provence. It is from the 12th century that the village began to develop, where the village is located on the road from Digne-les-Bains to Colmars passing by Thorame, and that a salt water source had been found, enabling the inhabitants not to pay the gabelle. The village was mainly agricultural (crops, sheep) and the harvesting of salt through the salt source was granted by Queen Jeanne in 1402.

During the Middle Ages, the village was cut back several times. The community of La Pène (or La Peine) was heavily depopulated by the crisis of the 14th century (the Black Death and the Hundred Years' War) and was annexed by Tartonne in 15th century, but continued to be a separate fief. It consisted of civilian buildings and a monastery abandoned before the Revolution. The only trace of this monastic presence is the Saint-Gervais oratory that was installed at the entrance to the hamlet, at the square where the villagers had installed a wooden cross of the chapel of the monastery, after its dismantling. This monastery and civilian buildings belonged to the family of the famous Digne philosopher Gassendi. Tartonne is not untouched by the Wars of Religion (with looting in 1574): population increased from about 200 to 500 inhabitants. The modest Château of Maladrech was built in 1642, near the road leading to Digne.

=== Early Modern period ===
The successive Lords of Baux (13th century to 15th century), the d'Agoults in the 14th and 15th centuries, the Villeneuves in the 16th and 17th centuries, and finally Gassendi until the French Revolution. At the end of the Ancien Régime, the community is linked to the viguerie of Val de Barrême.

=== French Revolution ===
During the Revolution, the town had a patriotic society, created after the end of 1792.

=== Contemporary era ===
The Revolution and the Empire brought many improvements, including a land value tax equal to all, and proportional to the value of the assets of each. To put it in place on specific grounds, the lifting of a cadastre is determined. The Finance Act on 15 September 1807 specified its terms, but its realisation took a long time to implement, officials of the cadastre dealing with the communes in successive geographical groups. It is only in 1837 that the Napoleonic cadastre of Tartonne was completed.

In the 19th century, the drilling of the clue of La Peine allowed the passage of most important convoys, and shortened the journey (30 km instead of 55 km). This road was abandoned in the second half of the 20th century with the arrival of the car and the creation of departmental roads.

As many municipalities of the Department, Tartonne acquired a school well before the Jules Ferry laws: in 1863, it already had a school which provides primary education to the boys at the main settlement. No instruction was given to girls: nor by the Falloux law (1851), which required the opening of a girls school in the communes with more than 800 inhabitants, neither did the first Duruy law (1867), which lowered the threshold to 500 inhabitants, concern Tartonne. It was only with Ferry laws that the daughters of the municipality are regularly educated.

Tartonne was occupied during World War II by the Italian forces in 1940. In the area, many airdrops of weapons and the establishment of STO (which led many young people to come to the vicinity) allowed the resistance to carry out actions against the German army, which occupied the region from 1942. In retaliation, many houses were burned and destroyed, along with the Château of Maladrech, which served as a cache.

== Heraldry ==
Arms of Tartonne	The arms of Tartonne are blazoned : Gold to three roundels of gules, two in chief and one at point, and an azure fleur-de-lis at heart.

== Politics and administration ==
List of mayors of Tartonne
Start	End	Name	Party	Other details
May 1945		Jean Maurel	Resistance	Former Resistance, is presented under this label
...				
December 1981	March 1989	Serge Dho	PCF	General Counsel of the Canton of Barrême (1979-1992)
March 1989	March 2008	Guénolé Vallon	PCF	
March 2008	Current	François Serra		

== Population ==
Historical population
Year	Pop.	±% p.a.
1968	104	—
1975	98	−0.85%
1982	101	+0.43%
1990	113	+1.41%
1999	131	+1.66%
2007	139	+0.74%
2012	137	−0.29%
2017	135	−0.29%
2023	127	−1.01%
Source: INSEE

== Sites and monuments ==
=== Our Lady of Entraigues ===
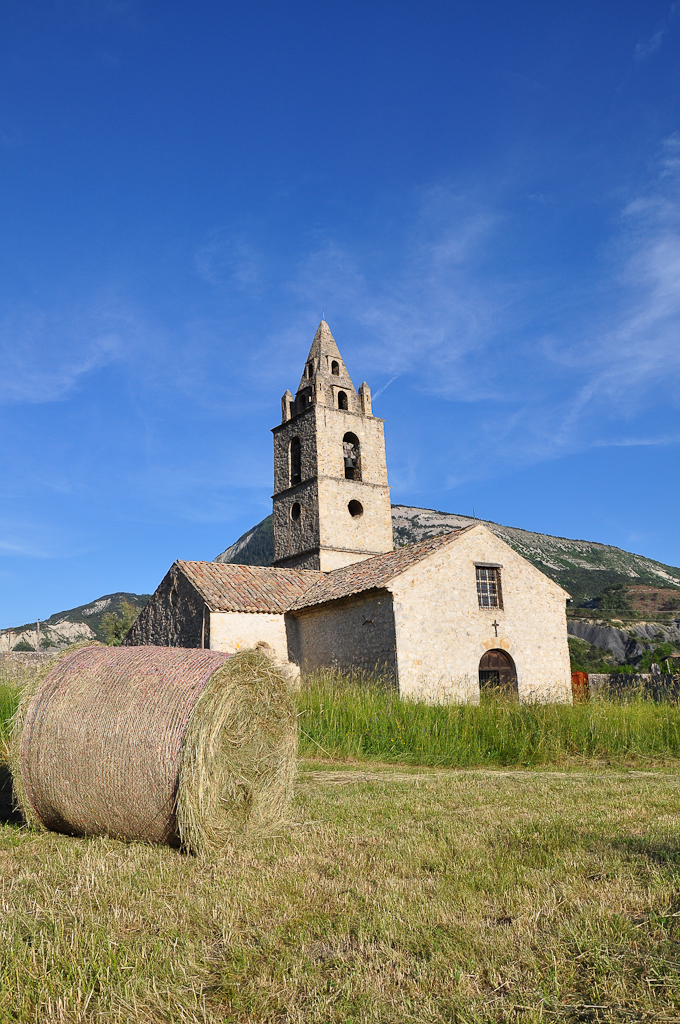
Notre-Dame-d'Entraigues [Our Lady of Entraigues]

The parish church is placed under the patronage of Our Lady of Entraigues and under the patronage of Saint Michel. It is built away from the village, and surrounded by the cemetery. The bell tower dates from 1564, except for the top floor which was added in 1865. The nave, built in the 12th century, has three bays covered with a barrel vault, rebuilt in the 17th century and in 1830. The chancel, in a short span, above the rounded apse (13th century); some capitals are carved, including an Atlas. An aisle on the south side has been abandoned; on the north side, two chapels date from the 17th century. It is an historical monument since 12 April 1972. It was restored in the 1970s (particularly with the casting of a concrete slab on the roof, which tended to deform). Other works have been carried out by an association for the safeguarding of the building, including to the floor, roof, wall, and sundial.

The furniture includes a bell that dates from 1571. The Church has several paintings, including a Donation of the Rosary of Patritti (19th century), a saint Blaise of Sebaste (19th century also) and a saint Michel slaying the dragon, as well as the statue of Our Lady of Entraigues from the 18th century.

=== Other monuments ===
The Château of Maladrech, with two round pigeonniers (1644); Maladrech means bad place. A chapel had been added to it between 1764 and 1779, but fell into ruins at the end of the 19th century. The rest of the building was partially destroyed in the 19th century. Consisting of two buildings, it also has a farm. The interior decoration includes the French ceilings, fireplace plaster; from the outside, you can see a cross and a sundial from 1642.

=== Other places ===
- The Clue of La Peine
- The source salt of the Salaou, covered under a vault, is a historical monument since April 1, 1993
- The Chapel of St-Jean-Baptiste, formerly Our Lady of the Rosary (1787), at Plan-de-Chaude in Thouron

The chapel of Sainte-Anne at Thouron, was built in the mid-17th century by the inhabitants of village, and restored in the 1830s. Small dimensions, the nave is 8.65 metres (28.4 ft) long, 4.8 metres (16 ft) high, and 5.4 metres (18 ft) wide.

== Notable people ==
- Jean Gaspard Gassendi (1749-1806), born in Tartonne, deputy to the Estates-General in 1789 and in 1799

== See also ==
- List of ancient communes in Alpes-de-Haute-Provence
- Communes of the Alpes-de-Haute-Provence department

== Bibliography ==
- Collier, Raymond (1986). La Haute-Provence monumentale et artistique [The monumental and artistic Haute-Provence] (in French). Digne: Imprimerie Louis Jean. 559 p.
- Baratier, Édouard; Duby, Georges; Hildesheimer, Ernest (1969). Atlas historique. Provence, Comtat Venaissin, principauté d'Orange, comté de Nice, principauté de Monaco [Historical Atlas. Provence, Venaissin County, Principality of Orange County of Nice, Principality of Monaco] (in French). Paris: Librairie Armand Colin. (BnF no FRBNF35450017h).
