= Chaudon-Norante =

- Commune
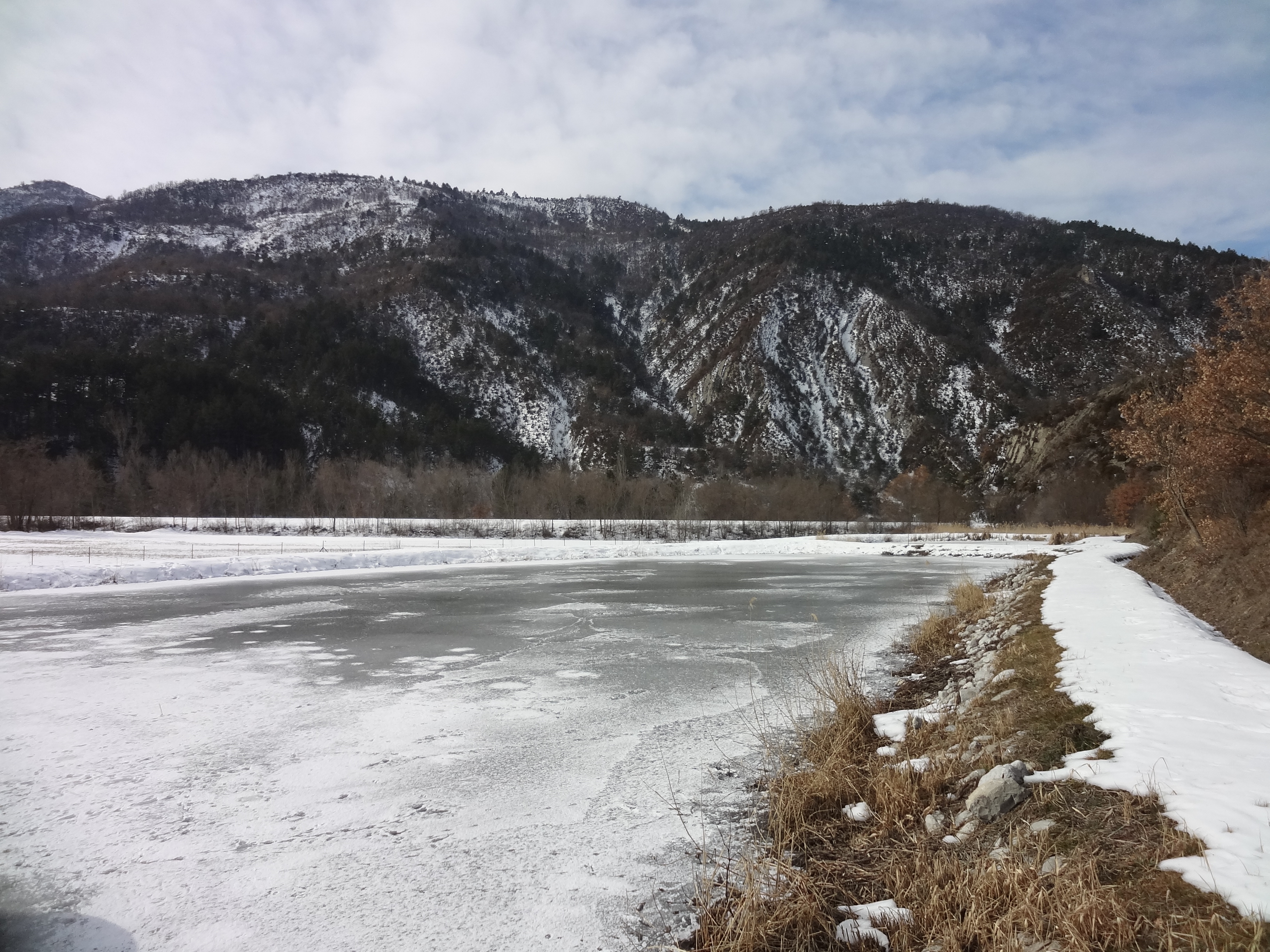
- The Lac de Norante

- Coat of arms
- Location of Chaudon-Norante
- Location within France Location within Provence-Alpes-Côte d'Azur
- Coordinates: 43°58′49″N 6°18′46″E
- Country: France
- Region: Provence-Alpes-Côte d'Azur
- Department: Alpes-de-Haute-Provence
- Arrondissement: Castellane
- Canton: Riez
- Intercommunality: Alpes Provence Verdon - Sources de Lumière

Government
  - Mayor (2026–32): Evelyne Rall
- Area^{1}: 37.48 km^{2} (14.47 sq mi)
- Elevation: 666 m (2,185 ft)
- Highest elevation: 1,612 m (5,289 ft)
- Lowest elevation: 628 m (2,060 ft)
- Population (2023): 175
  - Density: 4.67/km^{2} (12.1/sq mi)
- Time zone: UTC+01:00 (CET)
  - Summer (DST): UTC+02:00 (CEST)
- INSEE/Postal code: 04055 /04430
- ^{1} French Land Register data, which excludes lakes, ponds, glaciers > 1 km^{2} (0.386 sq mi or 247 acres) and river estuaries.

Chaudon-Norante (French pronunciation: [ʃodɔ̃ nɔʁɑ̃t]; Occitan: Chaudon e Noranta) is a commune in the Alpes-de-Haute-Provence department in southeastern France.

== Geography ==
The river Asse flows northwest through the commune.

== Population ==
Historical population
Year	Pop.	±% p.a.
1968	90	—
1975	72	−3.14%
1982	76	+0.78%
1990	101	+3.62%
1999	129	+2.76%
2007	147	+1.65%
2012	178	+3.90%
2017	183	+0.56%
2023	175	−0.74%
Source: INSEE

== See also ==
- Communes of the Alpes-de-Haute-Provence department
