= Blieux =

Blieux Blieus (Occitan)
- Commune
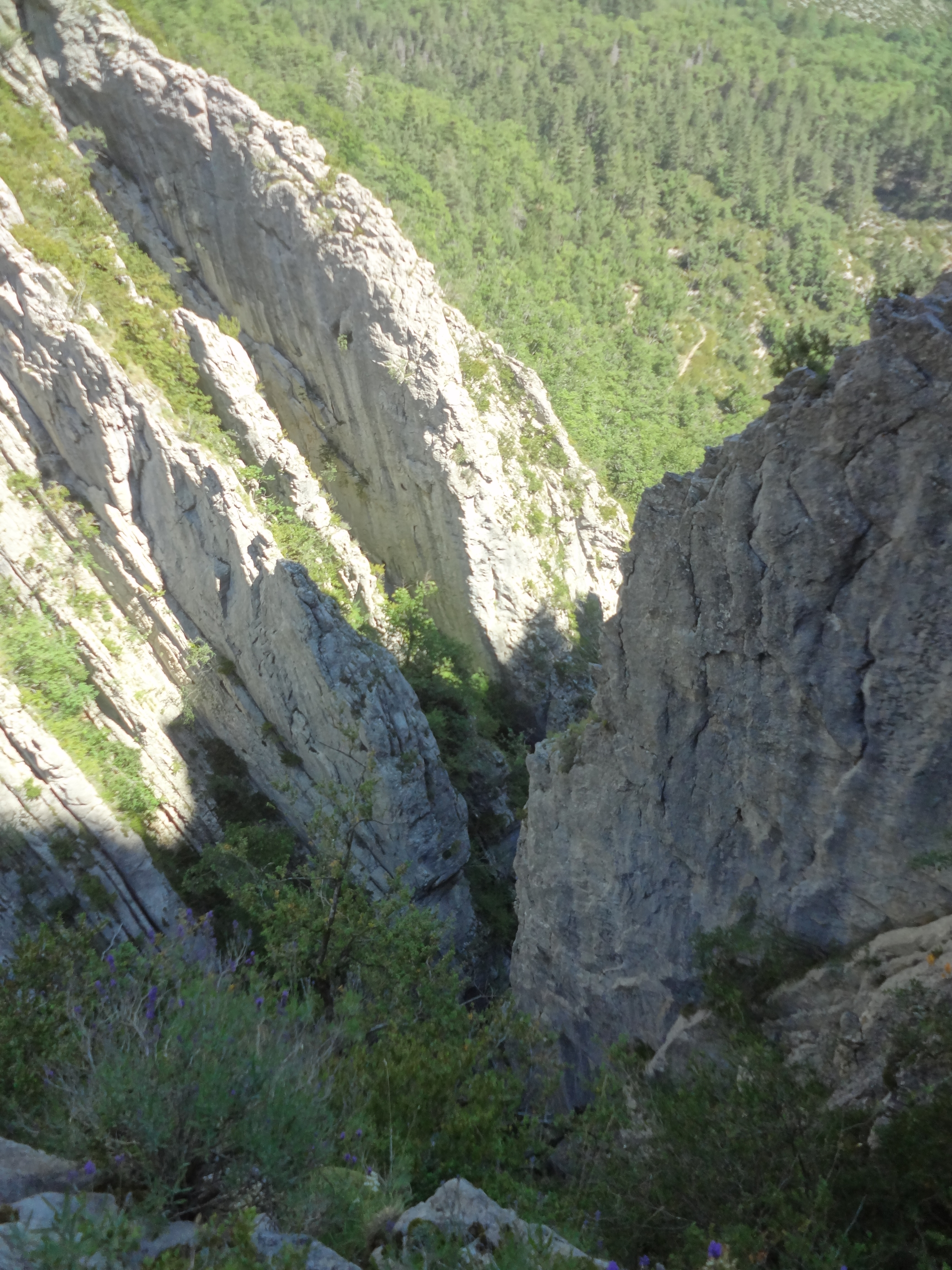
- A ravine in the territory of the Blieux commune

- Coat of arms
- Location of Blieux
- Location within France Location within Provence-Alpes-Côte d'Azur
- Coordinates: 43°52′24″N 6°22′18″E
- Country: France
- Region: Provence-Alpes-Côte d'Azur
- Department: Alpes-de-Haute-Provence
- Arrondissement: Castellane
- Canton: Riez

Government
  - Mayor (2026–32): Gérard Collomp
- Area^{1}: 56.8 km^{2} (21.9 sq mi)
- Elevation: 950 m (3,120 ft)
- Highest elevation: 1,921 m (6,302 ft)
- Lowest elevation: 831 m (2,726 ft)
- Population (2023): 60
  - Density: 1.1/km^{2} (2.7/sq mi)
- Time zone: UTC+01:00 (CET)
  - Summer (DST): UTC+02:00 (CEST)
- INSEE/Postal code: 04030 /04330
- ^{1} French Land Register data, which excludes lakes, ponds, glaciers > 1 km^{2} (0.386 sq mi or 247 acres) and river estuaries.

Blieux (French pronunciation: [blijø]; Occitan: Blieus) is a rural commune in the Alpes-de-Haute-Provence department in the Provence-Alpes-Côte d'Azur region in Southeastern France.

== History ==
The commune of Blieux first appeared on maps in 1100.

Much later, during the French Revolution, records show that the residents of Blieux had created a political club (patriotic society), which was very common at the time. (See Jacobin Club).

=== Name of the commune ===
According to Ernest Nègre, the first recorded name for the commune, Bleus, was derived from the Occitan word bleusse, meaning 'dry'. This was likely a reference to the local soil. By contrast, Charles Rostaing argues that the name derives from the pre-Indo-European root word, *BL, meaning 'mountain in the form of a spur'.

La Melle, the name of a nearby hamlet, comes from the Celtic word, mello, meaning an elevated location.

== Economy ==
Historically, Blieux was a pastoral community, with a yearly alpine grazing cycle known as transhumance. As with much of Provence, tourism the primary source of economic activity today.

== Geography ==
The village is located at an altitude of 950m, in the valley formed by a tributary of the river Asse, known as the 'Asse de Blieux'.

=== Hamlets ===
- le Bas-Chadoul
- la Melle
- la Tuilière
- Thon
- La Castelle

=== Summits and passes ===
- Mont Chiran (1905 m)
- le Grand Mourre (1898 m)
- Crête de Montmuye (Montmuye ridge) (Highest point: 1621 m)
- Le Mourre de Chanier ( 1930 m)

== Demographics ==
Historical population
Year	Pop.	±% p.a.
1968	59	—
1975	54	−1.26%
1982	59	+1.27%
1990	57	−0.43%
1999	59	+0.38%
2007	57	−0.43%
2012	56	−0.35%
2017	60	+1.39%
2023	60	+0.00%
Source: INSEE

With the exception of those that have been totally abandoned, Blieux is one of the communities in the Alpes-de-Haute-Provence department that has experienced the greatest population decline from the mid-19th to the mid-20th centuries.

Inhabitants are known as Blieuxois (masculine) and Blieuxoises (feminine) in French.

== See also ==
- Communes of the Alpes-de-Haute-Provence department
