= Allemagne-en-Provence =

- Commune
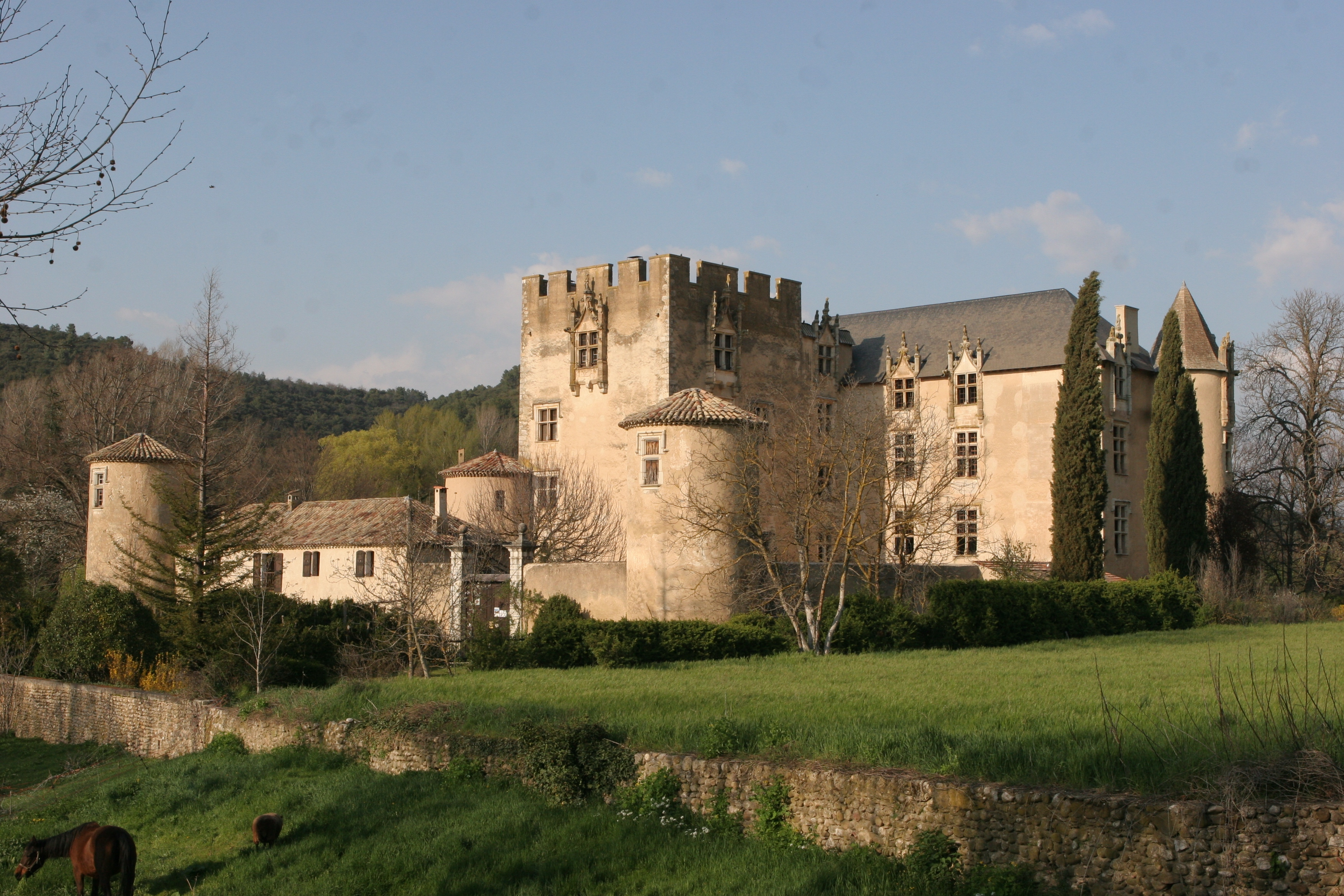
- Castle

- Coat of arms
- Location of Allemagne-en-Provence
- Location within France Location within Provence-Alpes-Côte d'Azur
- Coordinates: 43°46′59″N 6°00′28″E
- Country: France
- Region: Provence-Alpes-Côte d'Azur
- Department: Alpes-de-Haute-Provence
- Arrondissement: Forcalquier
- Canton: Valensole
- Intercommunality: Durance-Luberon-Verdon Agglomération

Government
  - Mayor (2026–32): Alex Pianetti
- Area^{1}: 32.99 km^{2} (12.74 sq mi)
- Elevation: 421 m (1,381 ft)
- Highest elevation: 622 m (2,041 ft)
- Lowest elevation: 389 m (1,276 ft)
- Population (2023): 544
  - Density: 16.5/km^{2} (42.7/sq mi)
- Time zone: UTC+01:00 (CET)
  - Summer (DST): UTC+02:00 (CEST)
- INSEE/Postal code: 04004 /04500
- ^{1} French Land Register data, which excludes lakes, ponds, glaciers > 1 km^{2} (0.386 sq mi or 247 acres) and river estuaries.

Allemagne-en-Provence (French pronunciation: [almaɲ ɑ̃ pʁɔvɑ̃s], literally Germany in Provence; Occitan: Alemanha, before 1953: Allemagne) is a commune in the Alpes-de-Haute-Provence department in the Provence-Alpes-Côte d'Azur region in southeastern France.

Unlike the other French town called Allemagne, which changed its name to Fleury-sur-Orne in 1916 during World War I, Allemagne-en-Provence has kept its name.

== Geography ==
Allemagne-en-Provence is located about 50 km northeast of Aix-en-Provence and 25 km west of Castellane. Access to the commune is by road D952 east from Saint-Martin-de-Bromes to the town then continuing northeast to Riez. There is also road D111 starting from the town and going east to Montagnac-Montpezat. Road D15 also follows a convoluted route south from Valensole to the town. There is a network of small country roads covering the commune. About 30% of the land is farmland with the rest mountain slopes and forests.

=== Hydrography ===
The commune is located at the confluence of the Montagnac torrent and the Colostre river, 36.3 km long, which flows southwest into the Verdon river. There is a large network of streams feeding into the Colostre throughout the commune.

In the 19th century, the village was frequently inundated by floods caused by storms with floods sweeping down the mountain and swamping the village streets.

=== Natural and technological hazards ===
All of the 200 communes of the department are in a seismic risk area. The area to which the commune belongs is zone 1b (low risk) according to the deterministic classification of 1991 based on historical earthquakes; and Zone 3 (moderate risk) according to the classification probability EC8 of 2011. The commune also faces exposure to three other natural hazards:

- Forest fire
- Flooding (in the valley of the Verdon)
- Landslide: the commune is almost entirely covered by a medium to high risk

The commune is at risk of technological origin due to the transport of dangerous goods by road. The county road D952 can be used for the road transport of dangerous goods.

The prevention plan for foreseeable natural risks (PPR) for the commune was approved in 1998 for the risks of flood and earthquake.

The town was subjected to a natural disaster in 1987 when there was a mudslide.

=== Localities and hamlets ===
In addition to the village, the town has two hamlets:

- Saint-Antoine
- Puberclaire

=== Toponymy ===
The area appears for the first time in texts from 429 in the Chronology of Lérins. The etymology of the place has attracted many assumptions, especially to keep away from the Alemanni, now rejected by scholars for half a century. The old form Alamania, noted in 1182, leaves little doubt and indicates a formation on an ethnic name by the Alemanni (with the suffix -ia) and perpetuates the memory of a colony or a military post of these people present before the great invasions.

Among the former conjectures dating from the Franco-German rivalry in the late 19th and the beginning of the 20th century was the denial of a connection between the name of the village and Germany. There is a possibility of a Gallic goddess of fertility Alemona venerated by the Roman garrison installed on the site of the present castle, or Armagnia (a bad spelling dating from the 13th century) which comes from area magna meaning "great plain of gravel".

The commune is called Alemanha Provença in Provençal according to the classical standard and Alemagno de Prouvènço according to standard Mistralian.

The locality La Moutte close to the D952 and east of the village refers to a Motte-and-bailey castle which has now disappeared. Notre-Dame to the west of the village on the D15 is also from a small hill which had a chapel.

== History ==
=== Allemagne and its lords ===
Around the year 1000 there were two castles in the commune: at Castellet and La Moutte. The two other castles (Notre-Dame, Saint-Marc) came later.

The Motte-and-bailey castle of Moutte was fortified for the first time in the second half of the 9th century: built on a platform of 450 to 500 Sq. M, two residential buildings were constructed: one using the ancient technique of murus gallicus. This building of 30 Sq. M is surrounded by a gallery on two sides, the other building is about 50 Sq. M. The two were deliberately burned shortly before the year 1000, to backfill the mound again to raise it by about 2 metres. The second construction consisted of a single building of 54 Sq. M, which caught fire in 1010 during an attack. It is possible that the construction of Castellet castle corresponds to the destruction of the first castle.

The lordship of Allemagne belonged to the Castellane family from the 13th to the 15th centuries, then it was the Oraison.

==== The Castellanes ====
The lordship of Allemagne became the property of the Castellanes in 1218 on the occasion of the marriage of Agnes Sarda (or Spata) with Boniface IV de Castellane. The same year Agnes Spata granted franchises to the villagers. The lordship of Allemagne was a barony around 1280.

On 15 January 1331, Boniface de Castellane, son of Boniface, Lord of Allemagne and Constance, married the daughter of Albert Blacacii, Lord of Beaudinard.

A small castle was built on a hill south of the village of Castelletum de Alamania. In the 14th century it fell into the hands of bandits - the Chamisard - who made it their base of operations for robbing the neighborhood. To put an end to it, the inhabitants of Riez united and drove the Chamisard to the gatehouse which they quickly demolished thereafter. An Agreement to desist was signed on 17 June 1417 by Boniface de Castellane, Lord of Allemagne which said that the Lord would abandon his pursuits against the community of Riez for the demolition of Castellet.

In the 15th century, the former community of Castellet, separated from Allemagne before the crises of the 14th centuries (the Black Death, the Hundred Years War) was joined to that of Allemagne, because it had become too depopulated.

It was in 1440 that, through a testament of Boniface IX de Castellane, the barony of Allemagne was separated from land belonging to Castellane and assigned to the eldest son of the testator, Antoine. The latter's son, Boniface X, succeeded him in 1472 and married Marguerite de Forbin.

His son, François de Castellane-Allemagne, Baron of Allemagne, Baron of Allemagne, enlarged the castle at Allemagne and died on 28 January 1523.

Their son Melchior de Castellane-Allemagne, Baron of Allemagne, never married and bequeathed his property to Nicolas Mas, his nephew, on condition that he bear his name and arms. A leader of the Protestant party, he was killed in 1560 during the Wars of Religion during a fight on his land. He enlarged and embellished the castle of Allemagne.

==== The Battle of 1586 ====
In August 1586 Leaguer Captain Hubert de Vins besieged the castle in Allemagne where the baroness was alone with her garrison commanded by the Lord of Espinouse. She resisted for 16 days and gave her husband Nicolas Mas-Castellane time to come up with the Protestant army.

He arrived in early September with the support of Lesdiguières surrounded by men from the lords of Oraison, Jerante Senas, Vintimilles Tourves, Forbin-Janson, and others - all enemies of De Vins. On arriving around Allemagne, Lesdiguières seized the heights and all the pathways in the area but just missed the encirclement of the ligueuses troops. De Vins then abandoned the defences that had held out for 16 days, and prepared for battle on the hill of San Marco. The battle began on 5 September 1586. The Baron of Allemagne committed to action at the head of his volunteers. The Leaguers managed to open a passage to Riez where they were home, pursued by the Huguenots. One of the last arquebus shots struck the Baron of Allemagne in the head and killed him on the bridge of his castle (5 September 1586). His widow, Jeanne de Grasse, presided at his funeral and executed eleven Catholic prisoners over his grave. It was nevertheless an important Protestant victory: the Leaguers lost 900 to 1200 men (killed, wounded and prisoners) and 18 flags of the 22 they had. The majority of prisoners had their throats cut at the news of the death of Baron of Allemagne. Twelve others were executed the next day on his grave.

==== The Oraisons ====
Alexandre du Mas de Castellane-Allemagne, Baron of Allemagne (1583-1612), son of Nicolas, married Martha d'Oraison in 1610. In 1612 Alexandre du Mas had a quarrel with Annibal de Forbin, Lord of La Roque and a duel ensued. The two duelists were put back to back, with their arms tied and fired to be both fatally struck. Their property was seized by the Queen Regent, who gave that of Alexandre to his brother Jean Louis who then gave them to his niece Gabrielle du Mas which ruined the confiscation. After a childless marriage to Antoine de Villeneuve, Marquis des Arcs, she willed it in favour of his cousin André d'Oraison.

Marthe d'Oraison was the founder of a convent of Capuchins at Marseille. She took the habit without taking the vows on the death of her husband. She then devoted herself to the poor at the Hotel Dieu de Paris where she died in 1637 and was buried in the Cloister of the Capuchins Saint-Honoré.

André d'Oraison (a German cousin of Gabrielle du Mas), Marquis d'Oraison, Baron of Allemagne on the death of Gabrielle du Mas de Castellane-Allemagne, married Gabrielle Gianni La Roche. They had three children, one of which, Madeleine married Jacques Louis Ancezune in 1699.

==== The Varages ====
On 24 November 1718, Madeleine sold the Barony of Allemagne for 216,000 livres to Jean-Baptiste Varages, the king's secretary at the Court of Auditors Marseille since 16 February 1712.

During the Revolution, Joseph Francis Varages, Baron of Allemagne, officer in the Angoumois regiment, adjutant to the General of Villeneuve, was wounded in Toulon defending the city on the royalist side in 1793 (see Siege of Toulon). He then emigrated and his property was declared national property. He did not return to France, ruined, until the Restoration.

With his son Alexandre de Varages, Baron of Allemagne (1815-1891), who died at Aix-en-Provence a branch of Varages-Allemagne. He made a will in favour of Paul d'Allemagne, grandson of Major-General Claude d'Allemagne, already Baron of the Empire, who, therefore, took up Arms of Varages-Allemagne (Azure, two lions combatant of gold bearing a star of the same)

=== French Revolution ===
The patriotic society of the commune was created during the summer of 1792. In 1793, the castle was designated to be destroyed but escaped demolition.

=== 19th century ===
In the second half of the 18th century the Faience industry (tin-glazed pottery) was thriving in Allemagne and this continued into the 1820s. The style imitated that of Moustiers-Sainte-Marie.

=== 20th century ===
In 1930 a cooperative built a distillery for manufacturing perfume.

Until the middle of the 20th century vines were cultivated in Allemagne and covered several dozen hectares. The wine was produced for home consumption and was sold in regional markets. This culture is now abandoned.

=== Heraldry ===
Arms of Allemagne-en-Provence	Blazon: Gules, a Castle of Or between 4 towers masoned turreted and pointed the same.

== Administration ==
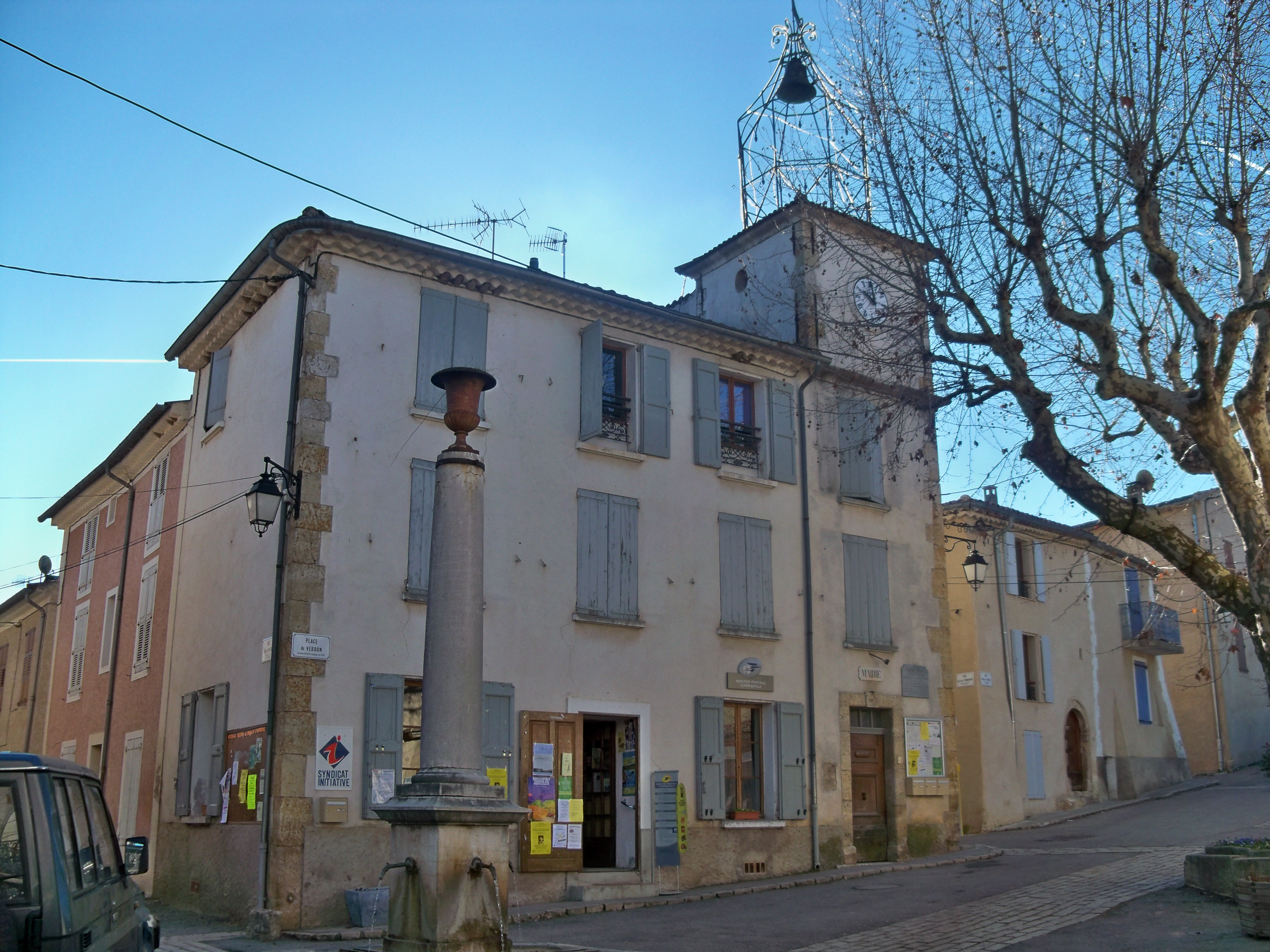
Town Hall at Allemagne-en-Provence

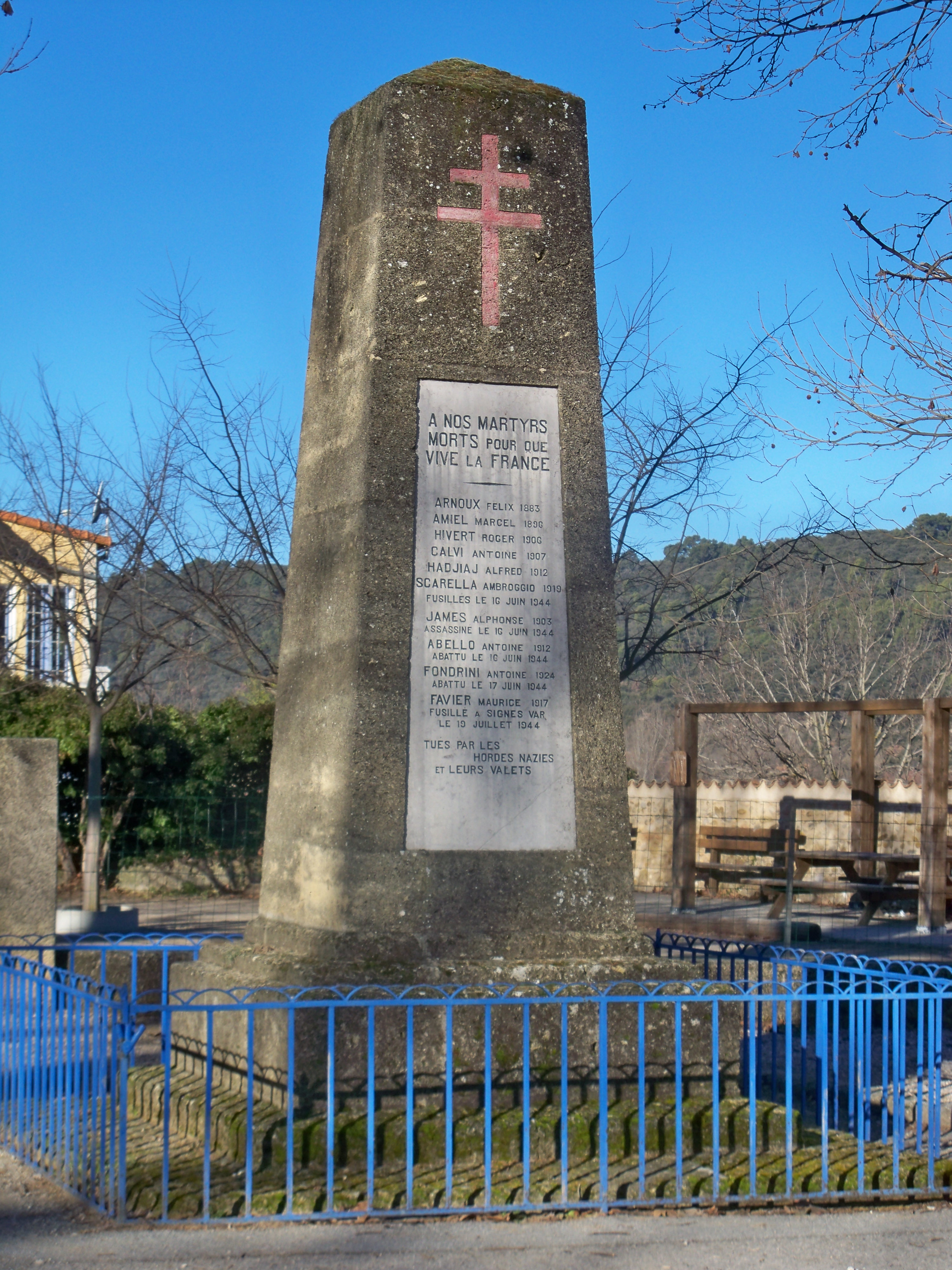
The War Memorial

=== Intercommunality ===
Allemagne-en-Provence is a member of:

- from 2009 to 2013: Communauté de communes Luberon Durance Verdon
- from 1 January 2013: Communauté d'agglomération Durance Luberon Verdon

=== List of mayors ===
List of successive mayors of Allemagne-en-Provence

From	To	Name	Party	Position
1983	2001	Lucien Villecroze	UDF	General Counsel
2001	2014	Christian Matheron		
2014	2020	Jean-Luc Zerbone	DVG	
2020	Current	Alex Pianetti		

=== Budget and taxation ===
The taxation of households and businesses in Allemagne in 2009 in Provence
Tax	Communal Part	Intercommunal Part	Departmental Part	Regional Part
Housing Tax (TH)	9,23%	0,00%	5,53%	0,00%
Building Tax (TFPB)	27,47%	0,00%	14,49%	2,36%
Land Tax (TFPNB)	65,69%	0,00%	47,16%	8,85%
Business Tax (TP)	20,84%*	0,00%	10,80%	3,84%

The regional share of the housing tax is not applicable. The business tax (TP) was replaced in 2010 by the Business Land Premium (CFE) on the rental value of the property and the contribution to the added value of enterprises (CVAE) (together forming the territorial economic contribution).

=== Environment and recycling ===
The collection and treatment of household waste and similar waste and the protection and enhancement of the environment are within the mandate of the communauté d'agglomération Durance Luberon Verdon.

== Population ==
The inhabitants are called Allemagniens or Allemagniennes in French.

Historical population
Year	Pop.	±% p.a.
1968	219	—
1975	202	−1.15%
1982	258	+3.56%
1990	355	+4.07%
1999	379	+0.73%
2007	494	+3.37%
2012	521	+1.07%
2017	539	+0.68%
2023	544	+0.15%
Source: INSEE

=== Education ===
The town has a kindergarten.

== Economy ==
In 2017, the active population was 329 people, including 33 unemployed. The workers are mostly employed (80%) and mostly work outside the commune (64%). Administration, education and health provide the largest share of jobs (31%), followed by industry with 25%, construction with 22% and trade and services with 16% in late 2015. Agriculture employed 2 people.

At 31 December 2015, the establishments active in the commune were mainly shops and services (26 of 57 establishments), primary sector (13), construction (8) and the industrial sector (7).

=== Agriculture ===
The number of agricultural establishments, according to a survey by the Department of Agriculture, remained stable in the 2000s at 16, most of the produce coming from 7 to 10 farms and the number of Sheep husbandry farms increasing to 4. Other farms practice mixed farming and hydroponics. At the same time, farms specializing in Market gardening disappeared. From 1988 to 2000, the agricultural area used (SAU) rose sharply, from 743 to 1342 hectares. In the 2000s, the SAU declined to 1176 hectares but remained at a much higher level than in 1988. Field crops occupy more than half the space (650 hectares - stable over ten years), the rest being mainly devoted to livestock farming (476 ha in 2010).

The cultivation of the olive has been practiced in the commune for centuries to a limited extent. The soil of the commune is at the altitudinal limit for the olive tree, which can hardly be grown beyond 650 metres. The local olives therefore only occupy a few tens of hectares of Agroforestry. After a period of decline, there are less than 1000 trees.

=== Industry ===
In late 2015 the secondary sector (industry and construction) had 15 different establishments, employing a total of 15 people.

=== Service activities ===
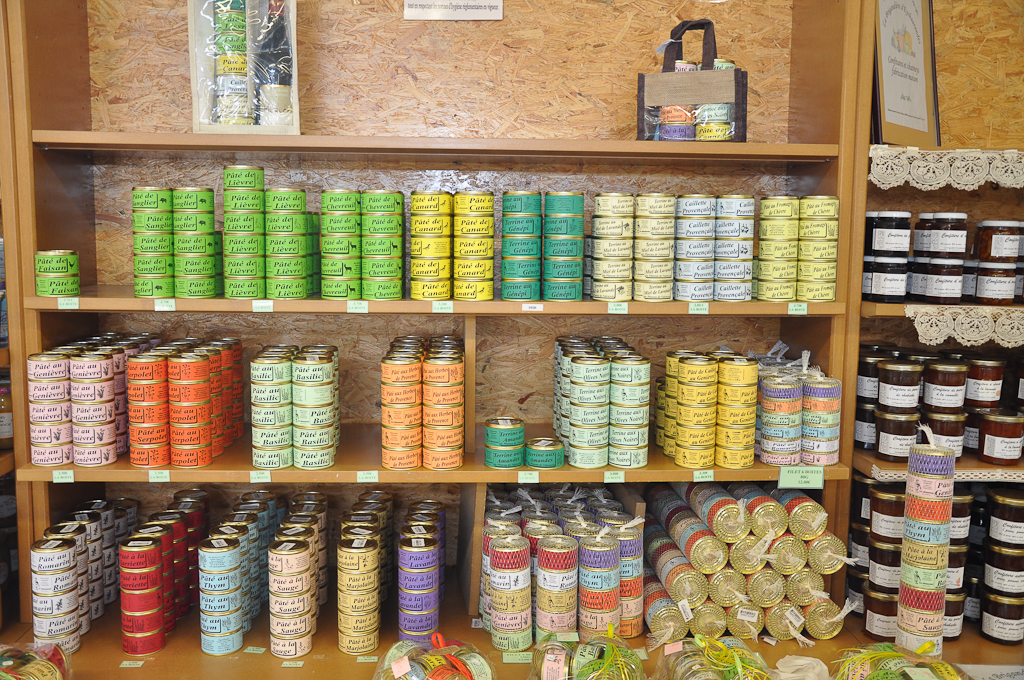
Shop selling local products in Allemagne-en-Provence

In late 2015, there were 26 establishments in the tertiary sector (trades and services), with 5 employees plus three administrative and public service institutions employing 10 people.

According to the Department of Tourism Observatory, tourism is an important function for the commune with between 1 and 5 tourists visiting per resident per year despite a limited capacity for accommodation. Several accommodation facilities for tourism purposes exist in the commune:

- 1 hotel (three-star with 9 rooms
- some furnished rooms and guest rooms

There is no camping or collective accommodation, according to the Atlas of accommodation.

Second homes by contrast provide a large capacity of accommodation with 162 dwellings (32.5% of dwellings in the town).

The shop selling local products offers a variety of local products. It was founded by thirty farmers, craftsmen and artists of the lower valley of the Verdon. They display their products: olive oil, jams, honey, biscuits, pâtés, wines, goat cheese, jewelry, knives, clothing, leather goods, stoneware, faïence, glazed pastries, Figurines, lavender oil, etc.

== Culture and heritage ==
=== Civil architecture ===
In the village, at the corner of a square is a house from the late 16th-early 17th century with a pilastered door with imposts in the Tuscan style facing the street.

Two houses have stairs with a handrail made with "gypserie" which is a type of plasterwork seen only in Provence.

There are three Motte-and-bailey castles in the commune:

- The Moutto motte
- The Notre-Dame motte
- The Saint-Marc motte.

The former lavender distillery (1930) is registered as a historical monument.

The chateau (14th century) is a registered historical monument. It consists of:

- a medieval part in the east (a keep from the end of the 14th century)
- a Renaissance part from the 16th century with many modifications
- a park (classified site)

The castle was a refuge for the Castellane family in the 13th century when Count Charles I de Provence confiscated the fiefs of Boniface V. Boniface X built the Renaissance dwelling (the north-south wing) and it was completed by his son in 1545 (the east-west wing). Jeanne de Grasse added the fireplace in the main room, decorated with "gypserie" plasterwork, at the end of the 16th century for Serge Panarotto and early next century for the Countess of Chaffaut. It is decorated with statues Ronde-bosse framing a Pediment, the whole surmounted by a finely crafted Frieze. The source of inspiration was from Antiquity. The medieval part lasted to the end of the 15th century, the top was heavily restored in the late 19th century.

It is decorated with many "gypseries" including a monumental fireplace flanked by two mythological characters in the great room (16th century). In a niche above the balcony of the castle tower is a small statue of a pregnant goddess.

The castle was used as a summer camp by the Confectioners Union of Apt in the middle of the 20th century. The built-up parts are classified as historical monuments. The park consists of a half hectare around the castle adorned with plantations of plane trees, lime trees, chestnut trees, and cypress trees has been a World Heritage Site since 1942.

The Chateau of Allemagne-en-Provence

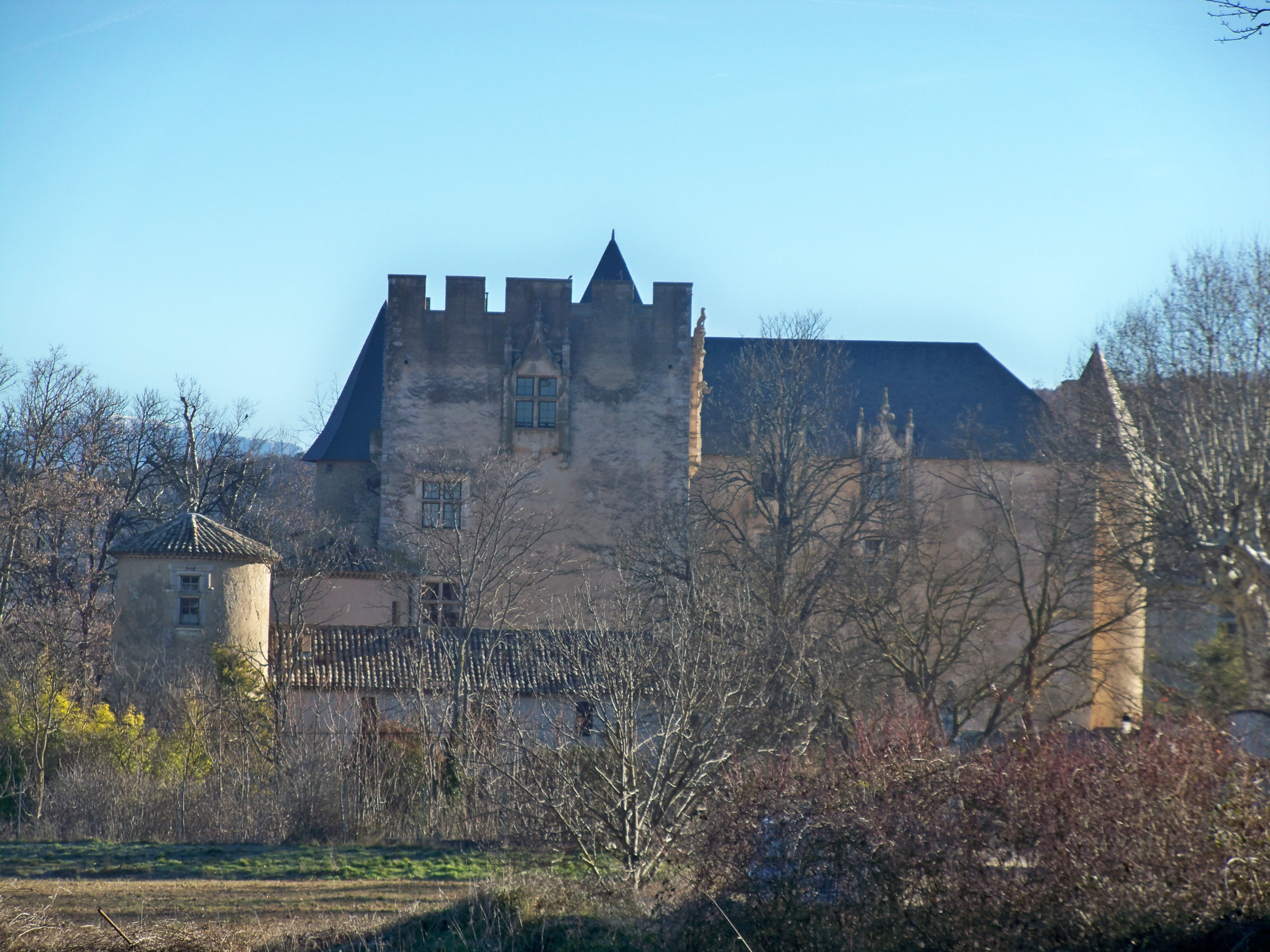
Château at Allemagne-en-Provence

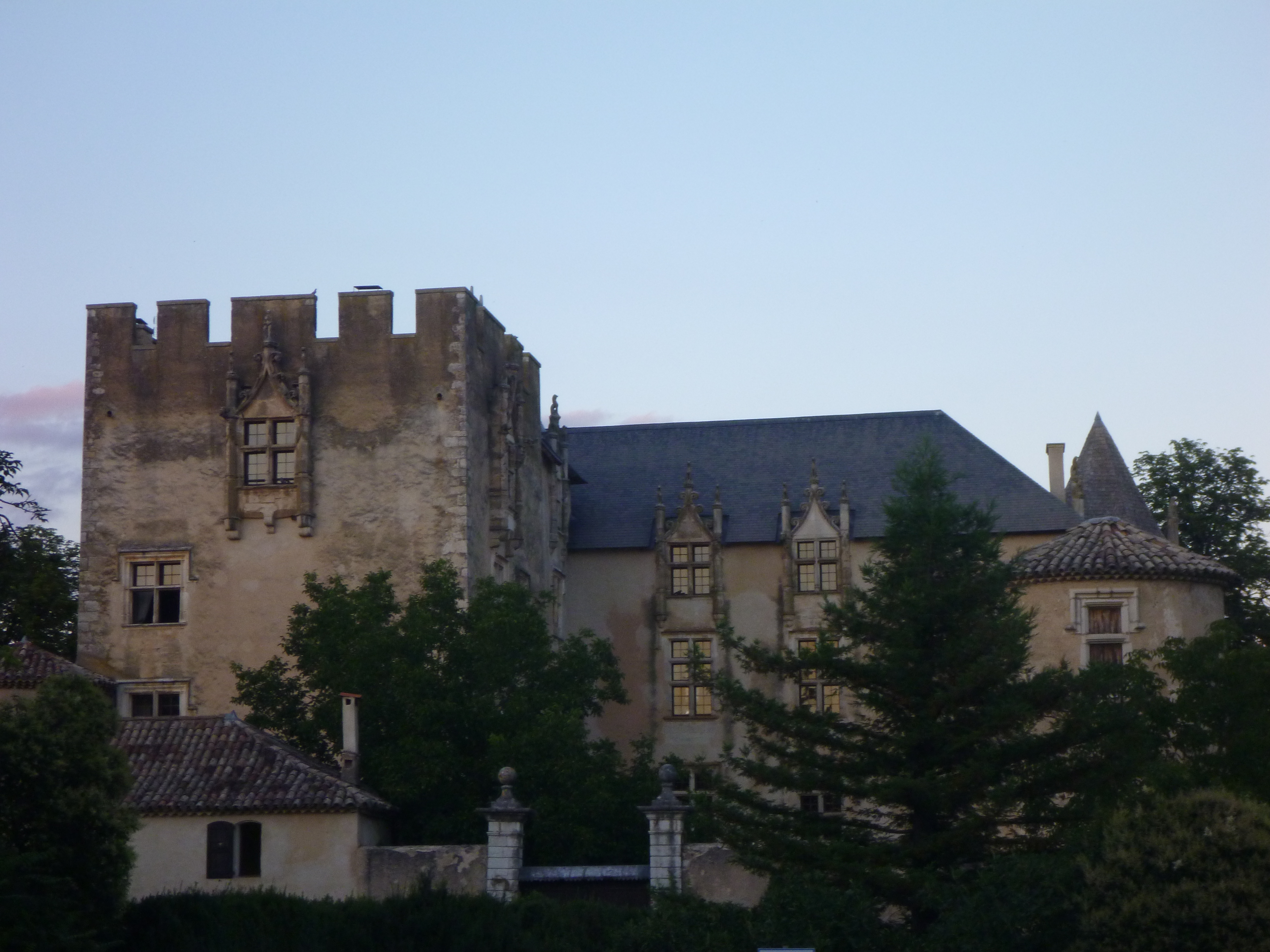

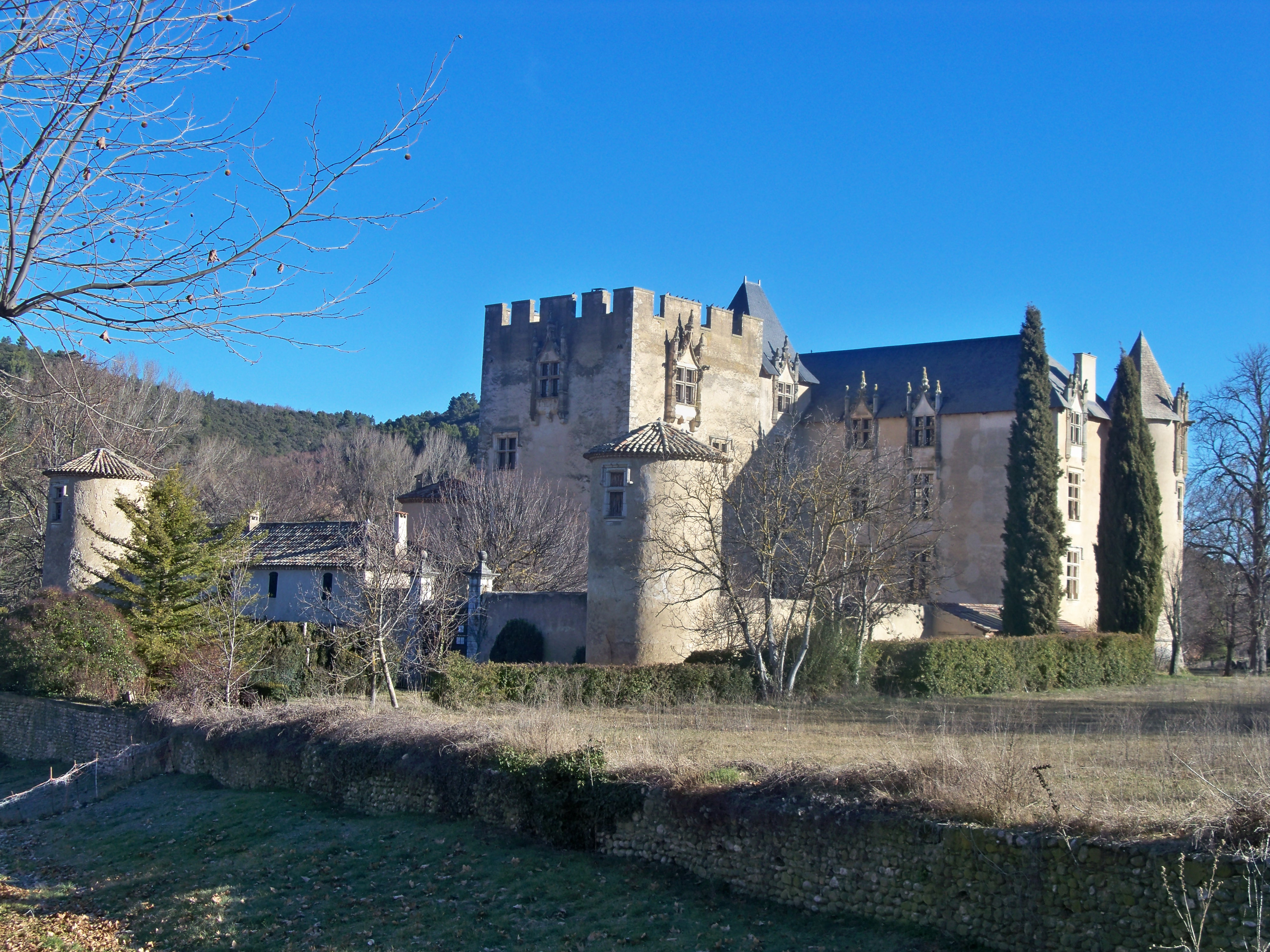

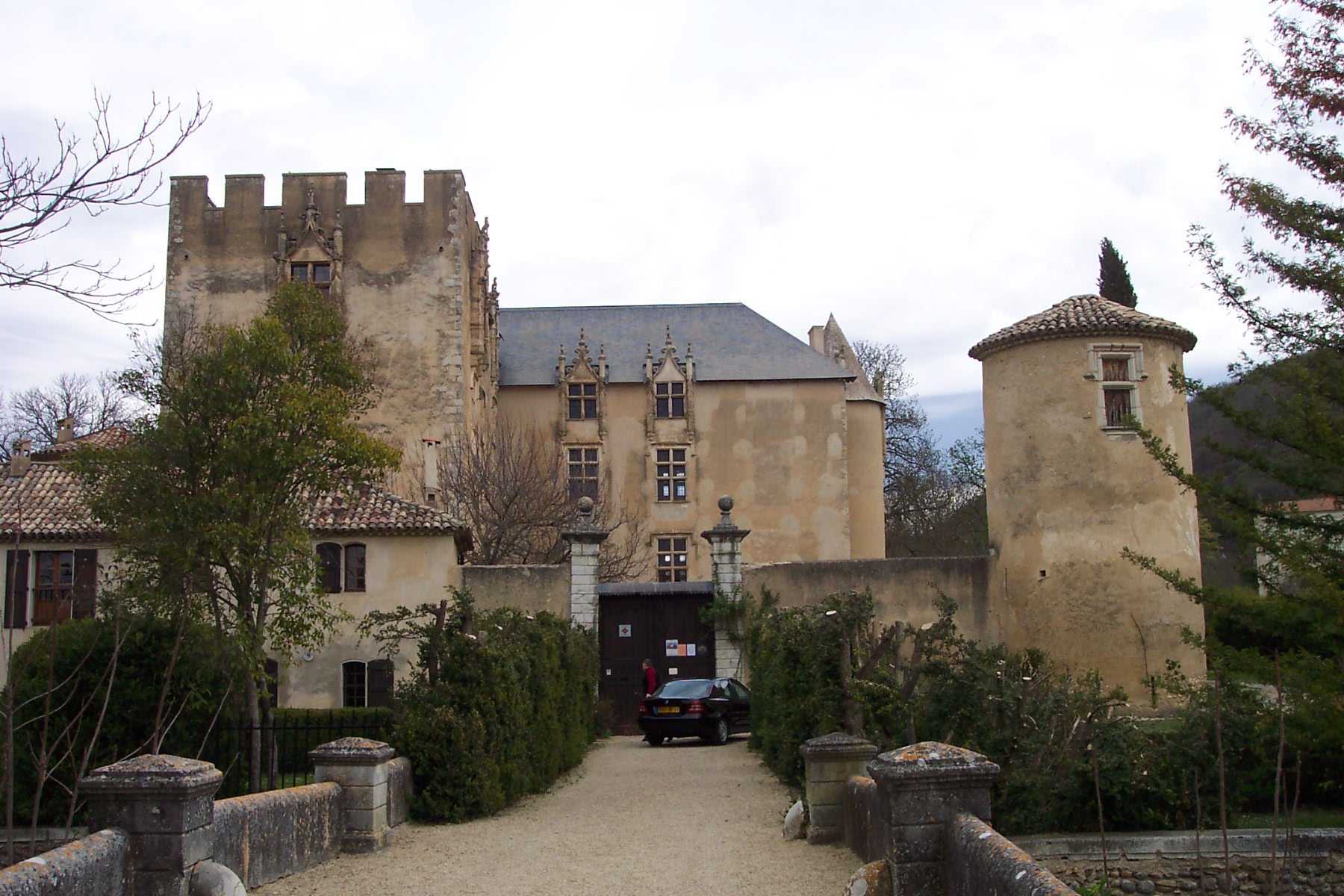

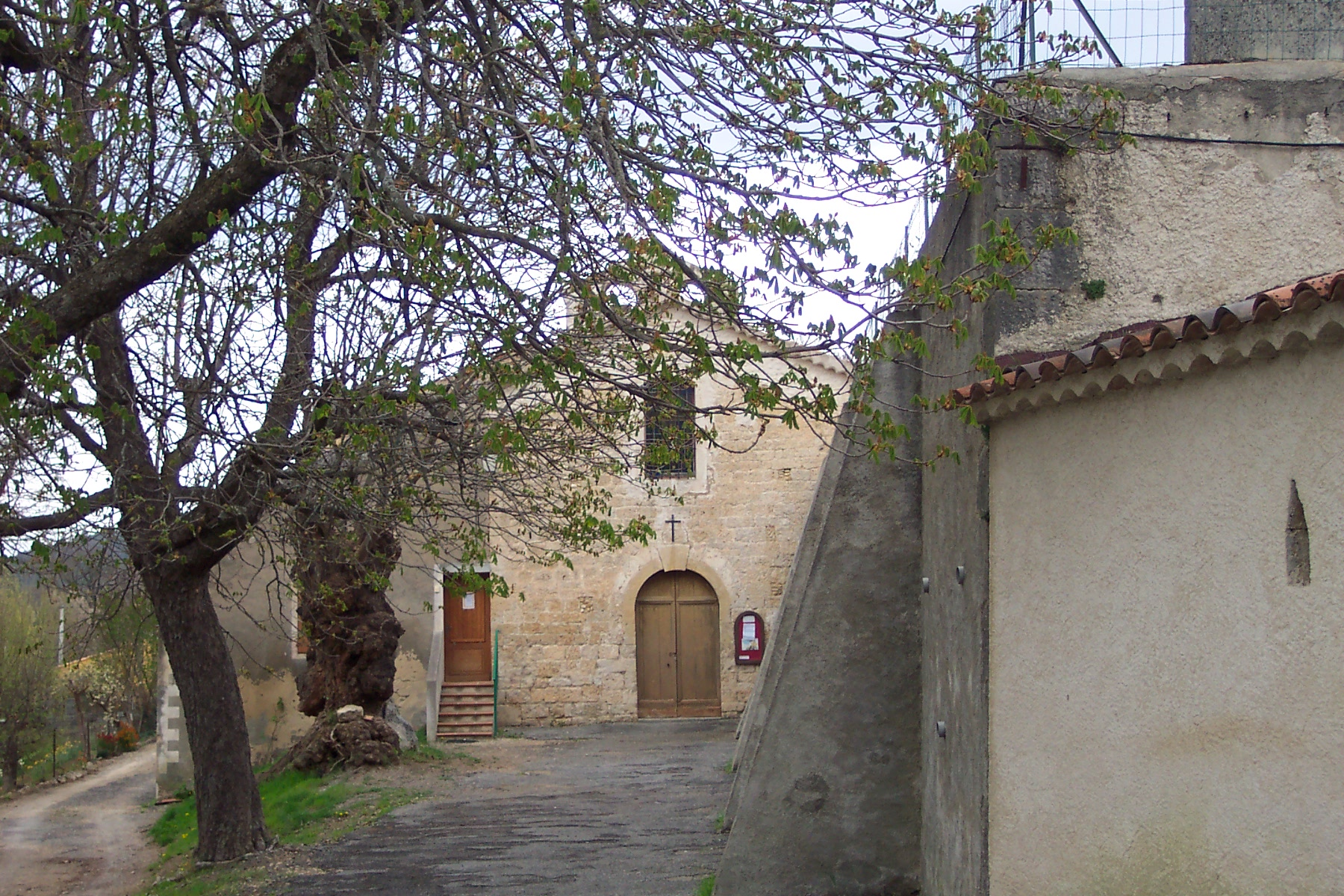

=== Religious architecture ===
The church of Saint Mark already existed in the 13th century, but the current building is not earlier than 1550, according to the Historical Atlas of Provence. The north nave is Romanesque, rebuilt in the 17th century, has been linked by large arches to the south nave more recently. The façade is from the 19th century. The chevet is flat. Its bell tower, the Roman-style choir are from the 13th century.

There are two paintings from the 17th century:

- a rosary with the fifteen mysteries of the Virgin (painful, glorious, happy)
- the Annunciation in the same style from the 17th century: perhaps coming from the workshop of a great master.

The tabernacle at the back is, in part, from the 15th century.

There are many items in the church which are registered as historical objects.

The chapel of St. Mark is built on the overhang of Vaugiscle, which overlooks the village for more than 110 metres. There were at least four successive stages of construction and every 25 April there is a pilgrimage to Saint-Mark.

Other chapels existed but disappeared: the chapel of Notre-Dame-de-la-Colle and the chapel of Saint-Pierre from the 18th-19th centuries, the chapel of Saint-Eloi on the road to Saint-Martin-de-Brômes (where the horses were blessed on 24 June each year), and the church of Castellet was reported in the Middle Ages.

== Local life ==
=== Public transport ===
Allemagne-en-Provence is served by a bus route that connects Riez to Manosque. A connection is made at Manosque with the SNCF railway station and the bus station. There is also an LER (Lignes express régionales) coach service operated by SUMIAN Coaches from Riez to Marseille via Allemagne-en-Provence, Gréoux-les-Bains, Vinon, and Aix-en-Provence (3 services daily except Sunday).

== Personalities ==
- Nicolas Mas-Castellane, called the Baron of Allemagne, Protestant captain
- François Charles Bouche, MP for Aix to the Estates-General of 1789
- Prosper Allemagne (1815-1902), who was sentenced to the Bagne of Toulon prison for taking part in the French coup of 1851, MP
- Pierre Allemagne (1815-1901), born at Allemagne, Member of Parliament from 1871 to 1881

== See also ==
- Fleury-sur-Orne, until 1916 also called Allemagne
- Communes of the Alpes-de-Haute-Provence department

=== Bibliography ===
- Raymond Collier, Haute-Provence, monumental and artistic, Digne, Imprimerie Louis Jean, 1986, 559 p. (in French)
- Under direction of Édouard Baratier, Georges Duby, and Ernest Hildesheimer, Historical Atlas. Provence, Comtat Venaissin, Principality of Orange, comté de Nice, Principality of Monaco, Librairie Armand Colin, Paris, 1969 (in French)
- Jean-Joseph-Maxime Féraud, History, geography and statistics of the department of Basses-Alpes. Nyons, Chantemerle éditeur 1972. Reprint of the definitive edition of Digne, 1861 (in French)
- Laurence Brucelle, Provence. Castles known and unknown, Éditions ARCOL, Pourrières, 1998 (ISBN 2-9508831-1-7) (in French)
