= Jean Bretog =

16th-century French playwright

Jean Bretog, born in Saint-Laurent-de-Digne, was a 16th-century French playwright. He wrote a short tragedy titled Tragédie française à huit personnages (1571).

== Modern edition ==
- R. Reynolds-Cornell, Théâtre français de la Renaissance, 1st series, vol. 4 (1568-1573), Florence–Paris, Olschki-PUF, 1992, p. 146-176.

== See also ==
- French Renaissance literature
