= Cantons of the Alpes-de-Haute-Provence department =

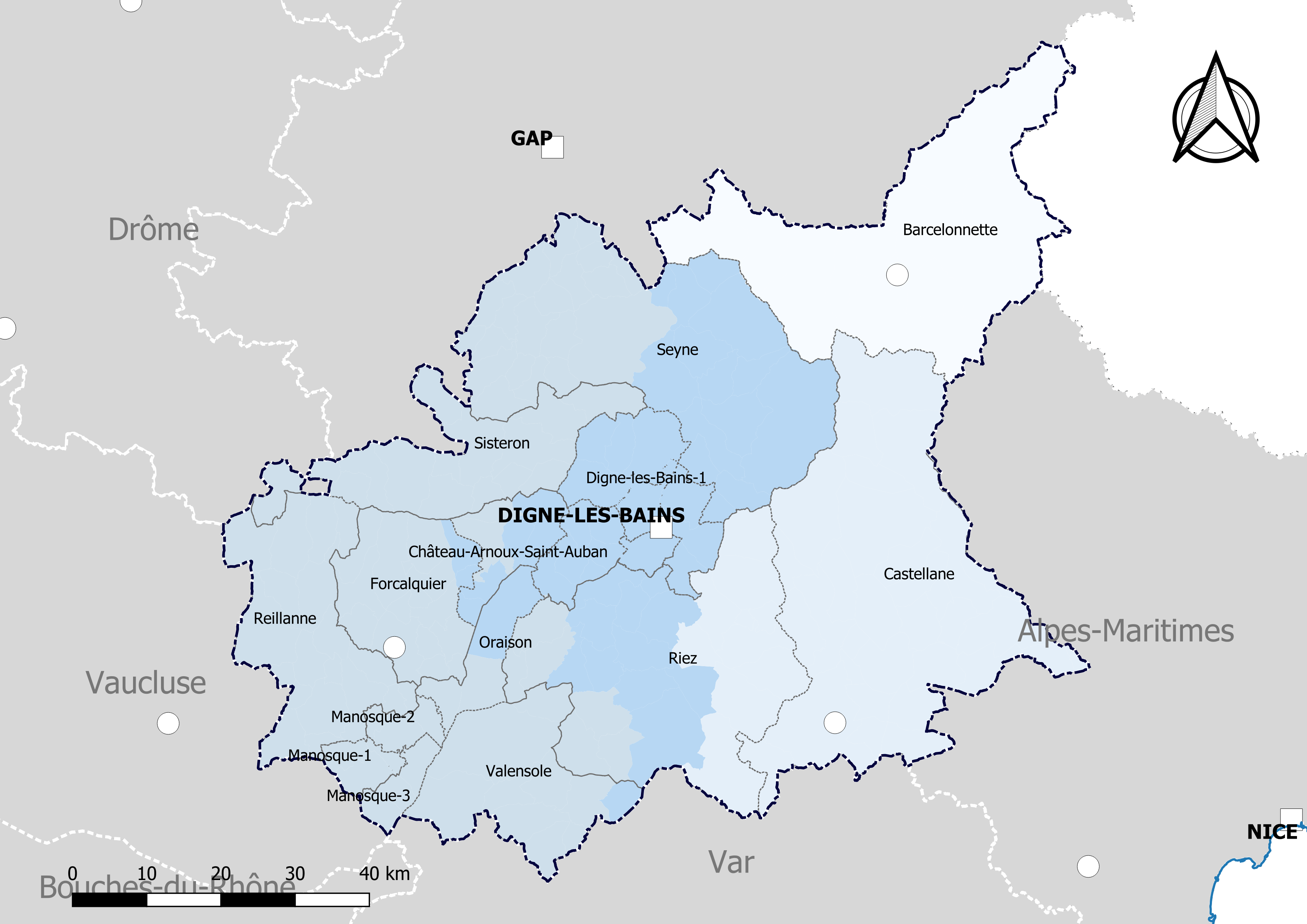
A map of the cantons of Alpes-de-Haute-Provence

The following is a list of the 15 cantons of the Alpes-de-Haute-Provence department (with their respective seats), in France, following the canton reorganisation that came into effect in March 2015:

- Barcelonnette (Barcelonette): 14 communes
- Castellane (Castellane): 32 communes
- Château-Arnoux-Saint-Auban (Château-Arnoux-Saint-Auban): 8 communes
- Digne-les-Bains-1 (Digne-les-Bains): 6 communes and part of Digne-les-Bains
- Digne-les-Bains-2 (Digne-les-Bains): 6 communes and part of Digne-les-Bains
- Forcalquier (Forcalquier): 15 communes
- Manosque-1 (Manosque): 2 communes and part of Manosque
- Manosque-2 (Manosque): 2 communes and part of Manosque
- Manosque-3 (Manosque): 2 communes and part of Manosque
- Oraison (Oraison): 3 communes
- Reillanne (Reillanne): 21 communes
- Riez (Riez): 26 communes
- Seyne (Seyne): 34 communes
- Sisteron (Sisteron): 15 communes
- Valensole (Valensole): 10 communes
