= Sainte-Tulle =

- Commune
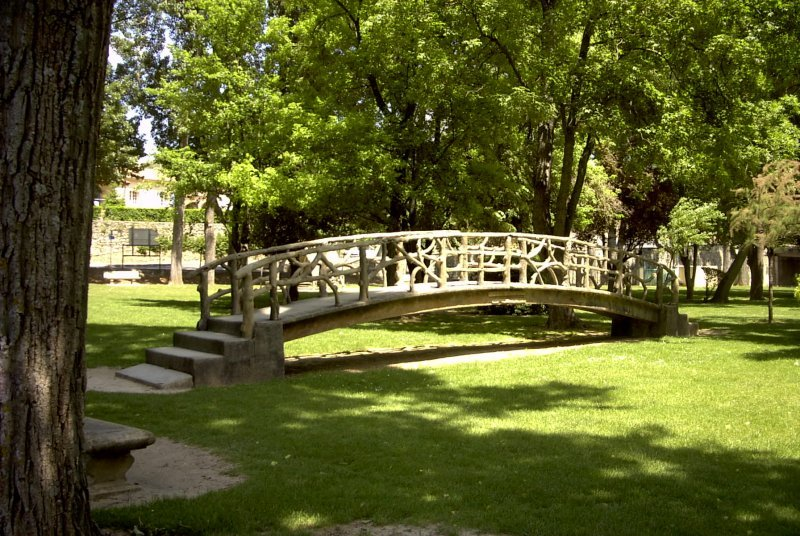
- Petrified bridge

- Coat of arms
- Location of Sainte-Tulle
- Location within France Location within Provence-Alpes-Côte d'Azur
- Coordinates: 43°47′12″N 5°45′57″E
- Country: France
- Region: Provence-Alpes-Côte d'Azur
- Department: Alpes-de-Haute-Provence
- Arrondissement: Forcalquier
- Canton: Manosque-3
- Intercommunality: Durance-Luberon-Verdon Agglomération

Government
  - Mayor (2026–32): Jean-Luc Queiras
- Area^{1}: 17.07 km^{2} (6.59 sq mi)
- Elevation: 299 m (981 ft)
- Highest elevation: 521 m (1,709 ft)
- Lowest elevation: 269 m (883 ft)
- Population (2023): 3,558
  - Density: 208.4/km^{2} (539.8/sq mi)
- Time zone: UTC+01:00 (CET)
  - Summer (DST): UTC+02:00 (CEST)
- INSEE/Postal code: 04197 /04220
- ^{1} French Land Register data, which excludes lakes, ponds, glaciers > 1 km^{2} (0.386 sq mi or 247 acres) and river estuaries.

Sainte-Tulle (French pronunciation: [sɛ̃t tyl]; Occitan: Santa Túllia) is a commune in the Alpes-de-Haute-Provence department in southeastern France.

== Population ==
Historical population

Year	Pop.	±% p.a.
1793	741	—
1800	863	+2.20%
1806	972	+2.00%
1821	1,072	+0.65%
1831	1,164	+0.83%
1836	1,081	−1.47%
1841	1,001	−1.53%
1846	924	−1.59%
1851	896	−0.61%
1856	960	+1.39%
1861	887	−1.57%
1866	850	−0.85%
1872	802	−0.96%
1876	790	−0.38%
1881	718	−1.89%
1886	647	−2.06%
1891	636	−0.34%
1896	624	−0.38%
1901	667	+1.34%

Year	Pop.	±% p.a.
1906	662	−0.15%
1911	683	+0.63%
1921	1,515	+8.29%
1926	1,149	−5.38%
1931	1,237	+1.49%
1936	1,224	−0.21%
1946	1,365	+1.10%
1954	1,635	+2.28%
1962	1,857	+1.60%
1968	2,458	+4.78%
1975	2,520	+0.36%
1982	2,805	+1.54%
1990	2,855	+0.22%
1999	3,055	+0.76%
2007	3,247	+0.76%
2012	3,376	+0.78%
2017	3,408	+0.19%
2023	3,558	+0.72%

Source: EHESS and INSEE (1968-2023)

== See also ==
- Luberon
- Coteaux de Pierrevert AOC
- Communes of the Alpes-de-Haute-Provence department
