= Pierrevert =

- Commune
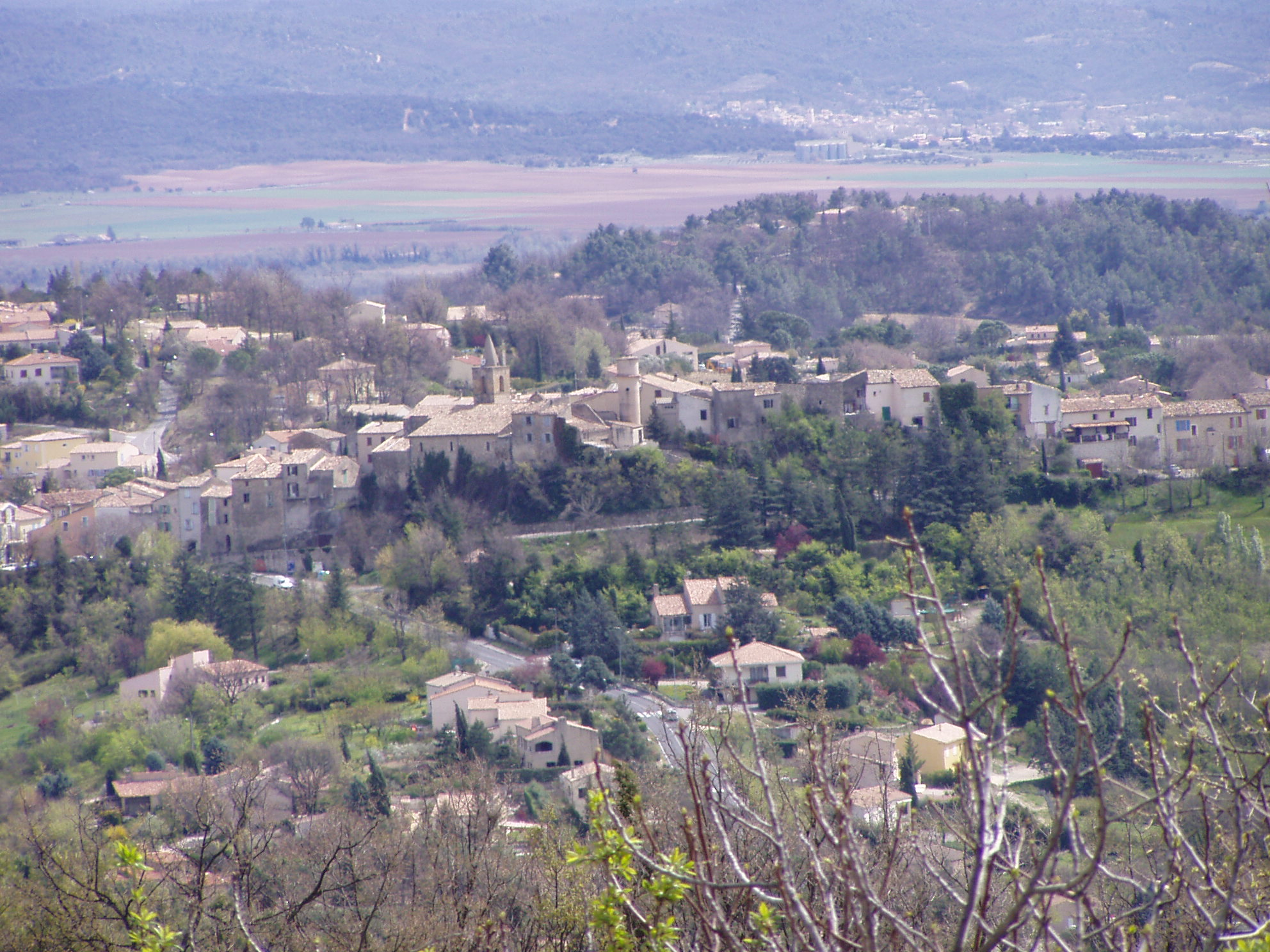
- A general view of the village of Pierrevert

- Coat of arms
- Location of Pierrevert
- Location within France Location within Provence-Alpes-Côte d'Azur
- Coordinates: 43°48′44″N 5°45′01″E
- Country: France
- Region: Provence-Alpes-Côte d'Azur
- Department: Alpes-de-Haute-Provence
- Arrondissement: Forcalquier
- Canton: Manosque-1
- Intercommunality: Durance-Luberon-Verdon Agglomération

Government
  - Mayor (2026–32): Christian Lageste
- Area^{1}: 27.9 km^{2} (10.8 sq mi)
- Elevation: 442 m (1,450 ft)
- Highest elevation: 618 m (2,028 ft)
- Lowest elevation: 308 m (1,010 ft)
- Population (2023): 3,945
  - Density: 141/km^{2} (366/sq mi)
- Time zone: UTC+01:00 (CET)
  - Summer (DST): UTC+02:00 (CEST)
- INSEE/Postal code: 04152 /04860
- ^{1} French Land Register data, which excludes lakes, ponds, glaciers > 1 km^{2} (0.386 sq mi or 247 acres) and river estuaries.

Pierrevert (French pronunciation: [pjɛʁvɛʁ]; Occitan: Peiravèrd) is a commune in the Alpes-de-Haute-Provence department in southeastern France.

It is at the centre of the Pierrevert wine appellation, that makes red, white and rosé. It includes some of the highest altitude vineyards in Provence. The area includes 800 hectares of vines, of which 450 are AOP, and 350 belong to the Alpes-de-Haute-Provence IGP. There are 7 producers (6 private estates and one co-operative).

== Population ==
Historical population

Year	Pop.	±% p.a.
1793	768	—
1800	755	−0.24%
1806	886	+2.70%
1821	908	+0.16%
1831	852	−0.63%
1836	821	−0.74%
1841	902	+1.90%
1846	871	−0.70%
1851	850	−0.49%
1856	803	−1.13%
1861	813	+0.25%
1866	785	−0.70%
1872	730	−1.20%
1876	702	−0.97%
1881	662	−1.17%
1886	616	−1.43%
1891	526	−3.11%
1896	528	+0.08%
1901	522	−0.23%

Year	Pop.	±% p.a.
1906	525	+0.11%
1911	519	−0.23%
1921	522	+0.06%
1926	403	−5.04%
1931	421	+0.88%
1936	405	−0.77%
1946	347	−1.53%
1954	431	+2.75%
1962	518	+2.32%
1968	1,028	+12.10%
1975	1,772	+8.09%
1982	2,560	+5.40%
1990	2,914	+1.63%
1999	3,280	+1.32%
2007	3,577	+1.09%
2012	3,699	+0.67%
2017	3,816	+0.62%
2023	3,945	+0.56%

Source: EHESS and INSEE (1968-2023)

== See also ==
- Luberon
- Communes of the Alpes-de-Haute-Provence department
- Coteaux de Pierrevert AOC
