= Brunet, Alpes-de-Haute-Provence =

Brunet
- Commune
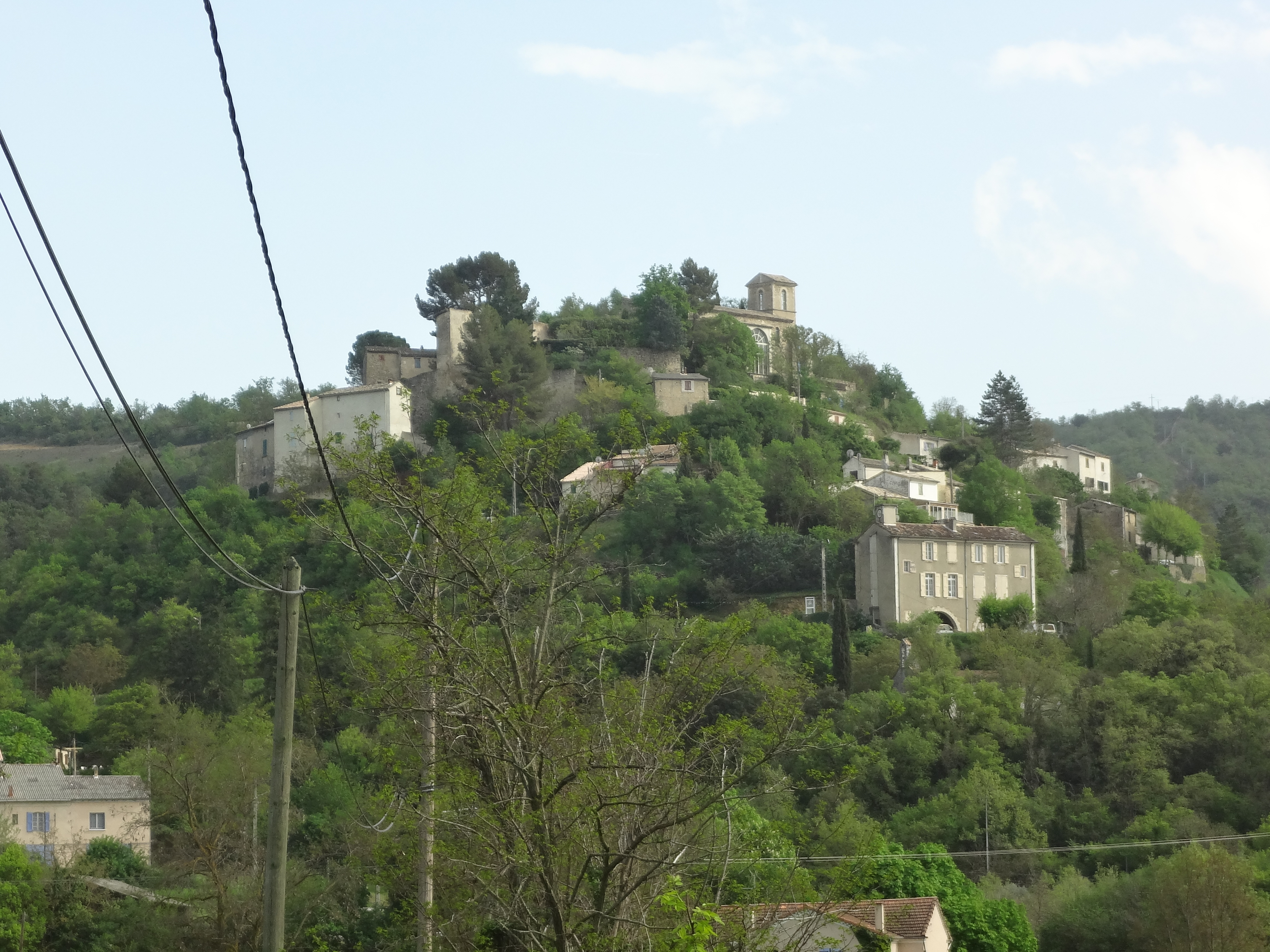
- The village of Brunet, seen from the north

- Coat of arms
- Location of Brunet
- Location within France Location within Provence-Alpes-Côte d'Azur
- Coordinates: 43°53′32″N 6°01′52″E
- Country: France
- Region: Provence-Alpes-Côte d'Azur
- Department: Alpes-de-Haute-Provence
- Arrondissement: Forcalquier
- Canton: Valensole
- Intercommunality: Durance-Luberon-Verdon Agglomération

Government
  - Mayor (2026–32): Francis Berard
- Area^{1}: 28.47 km^{2} (10.99 sq mi)
- Elevation: 425 m (1,394 ft)
- Highest elevation: 690 m (2,260 ft)
- Lowest elevation: 369 m (1,211 ft)
- Population (2023): 299
  - Density: 10.5/km^{2} (27.2/sq mi)
- Time zone: UTC+01:00 (CET)
  - Summer (DST): UTC+02:00 (CEST)
- INSEE/Postal code: 04035 /04210
- ^{1} French Land Register data, which excludes lakes, ponds, glaciers > 1 km^{2} (0.386 sq mi or 247 acres) and river estuaries.

Brunet (French pronunciation: [bʁynɛ]) is a commune in the Alpes-de-Haute-Provence department in southeastern France.

== Geography ==
The village lies on the left bank of the Asse, which forms most of the commune's northern border.

== Population ==
Historical population
| Year | Pop. | ±% p.a. |
|---|---|---|
| 1968 | 186 | — |
| 1975 | 217 | +2.23% |
| 1982 | 258 | +2.50% |
| 1990 | 162 | −5.65% |
| 1999 | 218 | +3.35% |
| 2007 | 254 | +1.93% |
| 2012 | 260 | +0.47% |
| 2017 | 278 | +1.35% |
| 2023 | 299 | +1.22% |
Source: INSEE

== See also ==
- Communes of the Alpes-de-Haute-Provence department
