= Volx =

- Commune
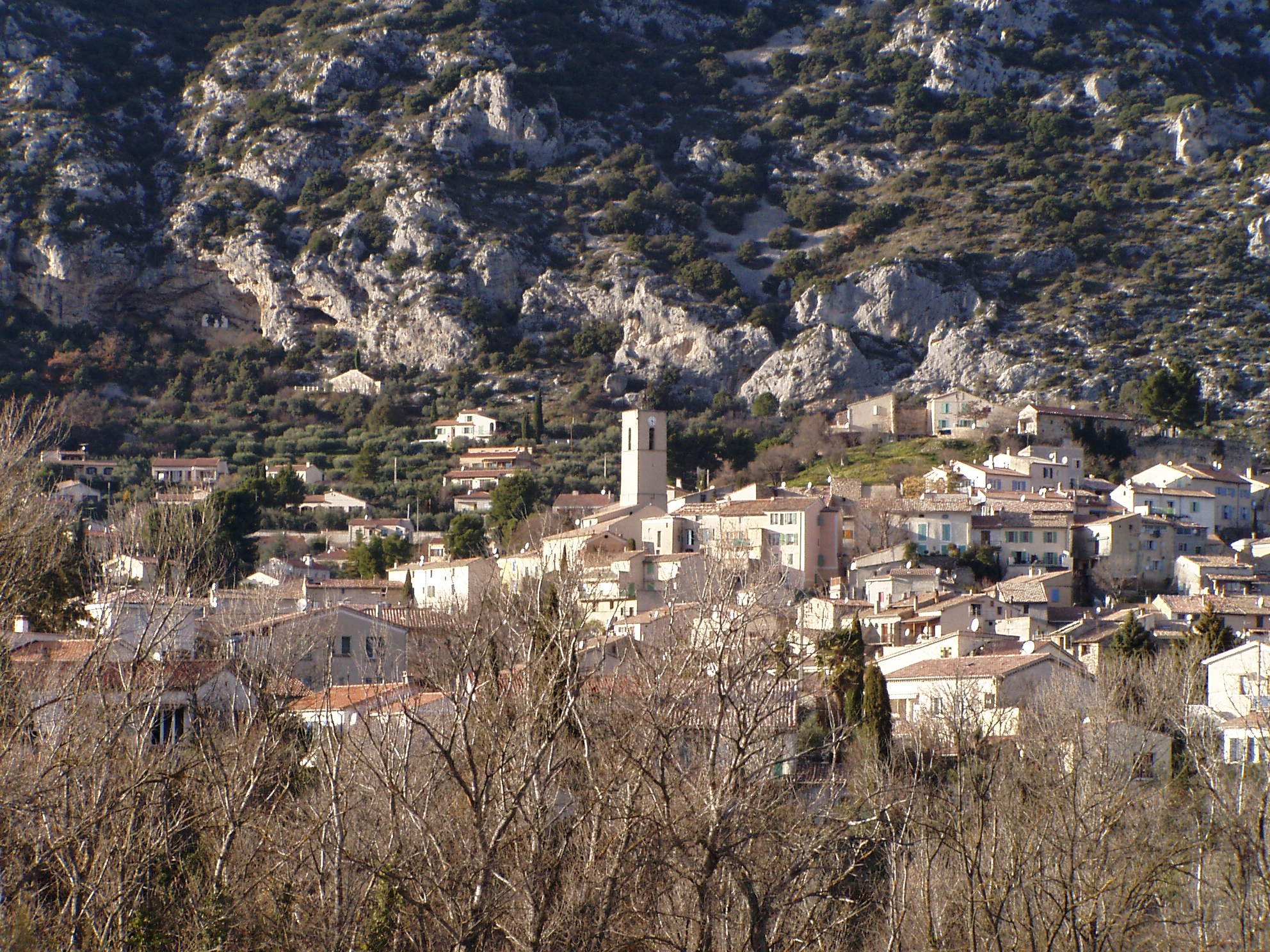

- Coat of arms
- Location of Volx
- Location within France Location within Provence-Alpes-Côte d'Azur
- Coordinates: 43°52′42″N 5°50′33″E
- Country: France
- Region: Provence-Alpes-Côte d'Azur
- Department: Alpes-de-Haute-Provence
- Arrondissement: Forcalquier
- Canton: Manosque-2
- Intercommunality: Durance-Luberon-Verdon Agglomération

Government
  - Mayor (2026–32): Béatrice Garcia
- Area^{1}: 19.52 km^{2} (7.54 sq mi)
- Elevation: 335 m (1,099 ft)
- Highest elevation: 791 m (2,595 ft)
- Lowest elevation: 307 m (1,007 ft)
- Population (2023): 3,243
  - Density: 166.1/km^{2} (430.3/sq mi)
- Time zone: UTC+01:00 (CET)
  - Summer (DST): UTC+02:00 (CEST)
- INSEE/Postal code: 04245 /04130
- ^{1} French Land Register data, which excludes lakes, ponds, glaciers > 1 km^{2} (0.386 sq mi or 247 acres) and river estuaries.

Volx (French pronunciation: [vɔlks]; Occitan: Vòus) is a commune in the Alpes-de-Haute-Provence department in the Provence-Alpes-Côte d'Azur region in southeastern France.

== Population ==
Historical population

Year	Pop.	±% p.a.
1793	646	—
1800	688	+0.90%
1806	765	+1.78%
1821	921	+1.24%
1831	918	−0.03%
1836	959	+0.88%
1841	950	−0.19%
1846	975	+0.52%
1851	956	−0.39%
1856	946	−0.21%
1861	991	+0.93%
1866	908	−1.73%
1872	905	−0.06%
1876	955	+1.35%
1881	950	−0.10%
1886	888	−1.34%
1891	847	−0.94%
1896	786	−1.48%
1901	813	+0.68%

Year	Pop.	±% p.a.
1906	893	+1.89%
1911	894	+0.02%
1921	956	+0.67%
1926	903	−1.13%
1931	951	+1.04%
1936	868	−1.81%
1946	1,002	+1.45%
1954	1,059	+0.69%
1962	1,334	+2.93%
1968	1,902	+6.09%
1975	2,026	+0.91%
1982	2,185	+1.09%
1990	2,516	+1.78%
1999	2,690	+0.75%
2007	2,885	+0.88%
2012	3,090	+1.38%
2017	3,171	+0.52%
2023	3,243	+0.37%

Source: EHESS and INSEE (1968-2023)

== See also ==
- Coteaux de Pierrevert AOC
- Luberon
