= Corbières-en-Provence =

Corbières-en-Provence Corbièras (Occitan)
- Commune
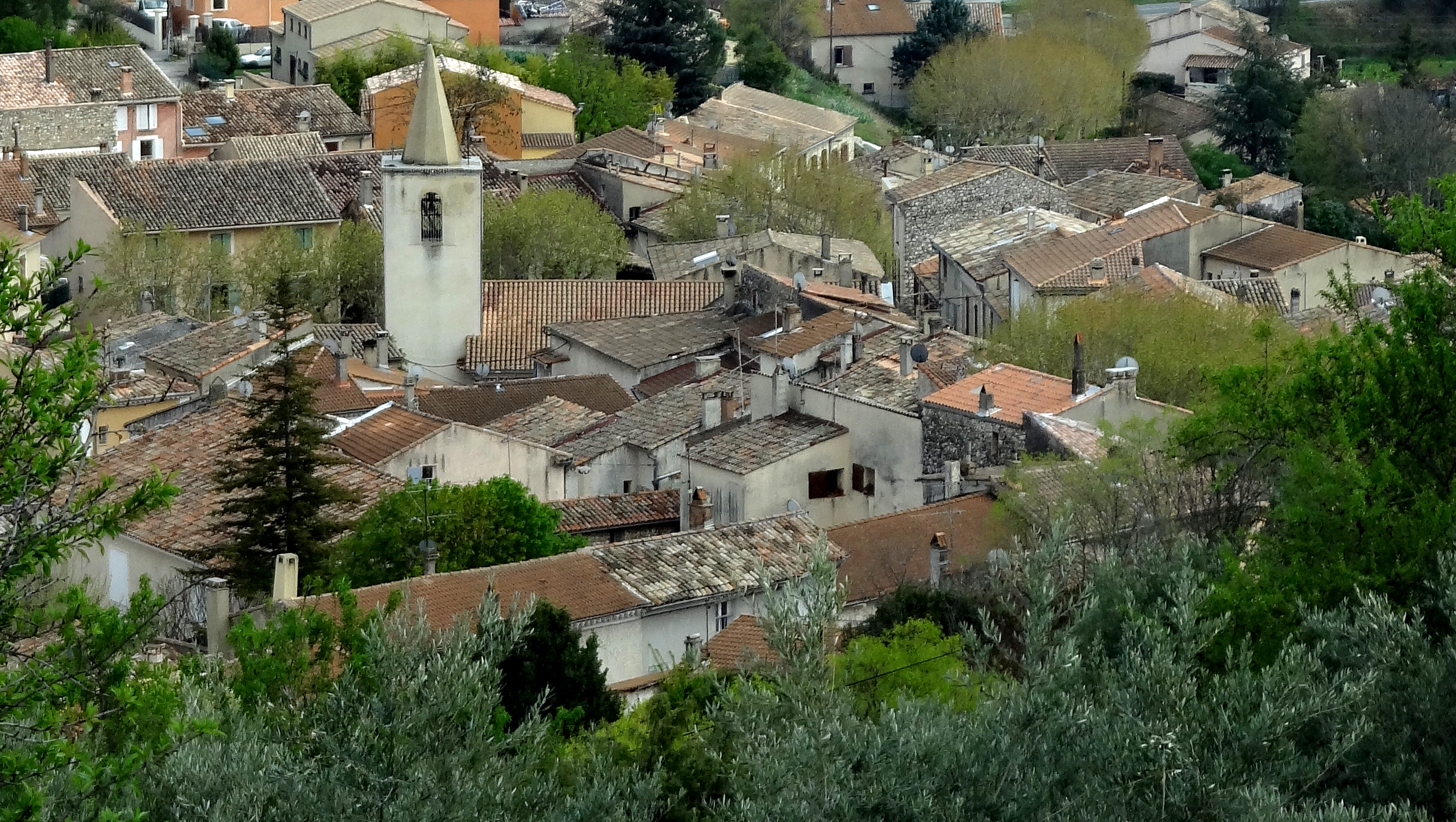
- A view of Corbières-en-Provence

- Coat of arms
- Location of Corbières-en-Provence
- Location within France Location within Provence-Alpes-Côte d'Azur
- Coordinates: 43°45′43″N 5°45′07″E
- Country: France
- Region: Provence-Alpes-Côte d'Azur
- Department: Alpes-de-Haute-Provence
- Arrondissement: Forcalquier
- Canton: Manosque-3
- Intercommunality: Durance-Luberon-Verdon Agglomération

Government
  - Mayor (2026–32): Jean-Claude Castel
- Area^{1}: 19.06 km^{2} (7.36 sq mi)
- Elevation: 300 m (980 ft)
- Highest elevation: 531 m (1,742 ft)
- Lowest elevation: 256 m (840 ft)
- Population (2023): 1,317
  - Density: 69.10/km^{2} (179.0/sq mi)
- Time zone: UTC+01:00 (CET)
  - Summer (DST): UTC+02:00 (CEST)
- INSEE/Postal code: 04063 /04220
- ^{1} French Land Register data, which excludes lakes, ponds, glaciers > 1 km^{2} (0.386 sq mi or 247 acres) and river estuaries.

Corbières-en-Provence (French pronunciation: [kɔʁbjɛʁ ɑ̃ pʁɔvɑ̃s], literally Corbières in Provence; Occitan: Corbièras), simply known as Corbières until 2018, is a commune in the Alpes-de-Haute-Provence department in the Provence-Alpes-Côte d'Azur region of Southeastern France. Its inhabitants are called Corbiérains (masculine) and Corbiéraines (feminine).

Corbières-en-Provence is located at the heart of the Provence historical province, on the departmental border with Vaucluse and Var, not far north from Bouches-du-Rhône, where the Verdon flows into the Durance. The commune itself is situated on the Durance, the banks of which are served by the A51 autoroute, nicknamed the "Autoroute du Val de Durance".

== Demographics ==
Historical population
Year	Pop.	±% p.a.
1968	633	—
1975	483	−3.79%
1982	660	+4.56%
1990	786	+2.21%
1999	791	+0.07%
2007	939	+2.17%
2012	1,041	+2.08%
2017	1,184	+2.61%
2023	1,317	+1.79%
Source: INSEE

== See also ==
- Coteaux de Pierrevert AOC
- Communes of the Alpes-de-Haute-Provence department
