= Durance-Luberon-Verdon Agglomération =

- Communauté d'agglomération
- Interactive map of Durance-Luberon-Verdon Agglomération
- Coordinates: 43°50′N 05°55′E
- Country: France
- Region: Provence-Alpes-Côte d'Azur
- Department: Alpes-de-Haute-Provence, Var
- No. of communes: {{{nbcomm}}}
- Established: 2013
- Area: 838.5 km^{2} (323.7 sq mi)
- Population (2019): 62,563
  - Density: 74.61/km^{2} (193.2/sq mi)
- Website: www.dlva.fr

Durance-Luberon-Verdon Agglomération is the communauté d'agglomération, an intercommunal structure, centred on the town of Manosque. It is located in the Alpes-de-Haute-Provence and Var departments, in the Provence-Alpes-Côte d'Azur region, southeastern France. Created in 2013, its seat is in Manosque. Its area is 838.5 km^{2}. Its population was 62,563 in 2019, of which 22,528 in Manosque proper.

== Composition ==
The communauté d'agglomération consists of the following 25 communes, of which one (Vinon-sur-Verdon) in the Var department:

1. Allemagne-en-Provence
2. La Brillanne
3. Brunet
4. Le Castellet
5. Corbières-en-Provence
6. Entrevennes
7. Esparron-de-Verdon
8. Gréoux-les-Bains
9. Manosque
10. Montagnac-Montpezat
11. Montfuron
12. Oraison
13. Pierrevert
14. Puimichel
15. Puimoisson
16. Quinson
17. Riez
18. Roumoules
19. Sainte-Tulle
20. Saint-Laurent-du-Verdon
21. Saint-Martin-de-Brômes
22. Valensole
23. Villeneuve
24. Vinon-sur-Verdon
25. Volx
