= Canton of Manosque-1 =

Coordinates: 43.83°N 5.78°E

Manosque-1
- Canton
- Interactive map of Manosque-1
- Country: France
- Region: Provence-Alpes-Côte d'Azur
- Department: Alpes-de-Haute-Provence
- No. of communes: {{{nbcomm}}}
- Population (2023): 12,403
- INSEE code: 04 07

The canton of Manosque-1 (before March 2015: Manosque-Sud-Ouest) is an administrative division in southeastern France. It consists of the western part of the commune of Manosque and its western suburbs. It includes the following communes:

1. Manosque (partly)
2. Montfuron
3. Pierrevert

== Demographics ==
Historical population
Year	Pop.	±% p.a.
2013	11,597	—
2018	12,133	+0.91%
Source: INSEE

== See also ==
- Cantons of the Alpes-de-Haute-Provence department
