= Quinson =

- Commune
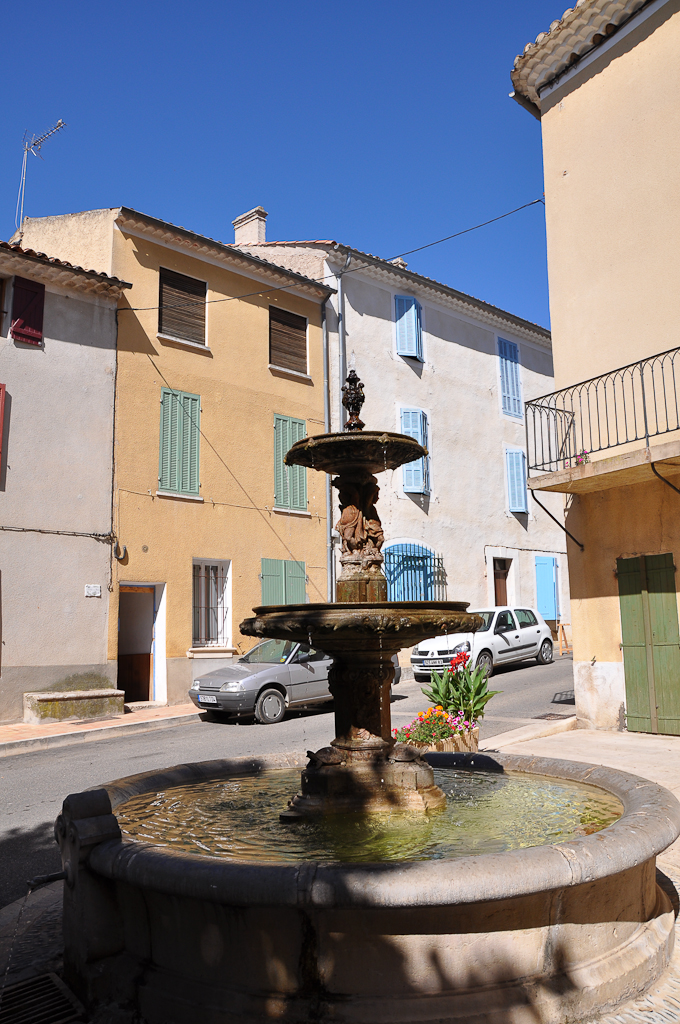
- The fountain in Quinson

- Coat of arms
- Location of Quinson
- Location within France Location within Provence-Alpes-Côte d'Azur
- Coordinates: 43°42′11″N 6°02′26″E
- Country: France
- Region: Provence-Alpes-Côte d'Azur
- Department: Alpes-de-Haute-Provence
- Arrondissement: Forcalquier
- Canton: Valensole
- Intercommunality: Durance-Luberon-Verdon Agglomération

Government
  - Mayor (2026–32): Yves Gonsolin
- Area^{1}: 28.11 km^{2} (10.85 sq mi)
- Elevation: 380 m (1,250 ft)
- Highest elevation: 584 m (1,916 ft)
- Lowest elevation: 353 m (1,158 ft)
- Population (2023): 368
  - Density: 13.1/km^{2} (33.9/sq mi)
- Time zone: UTC+01:00 (CET)
  - Summer (DST): UTC+02:00 (CEST)
- INSEE/Postal code: 04158 /04500
- ^{1} French Land Register data, which excludes lakes, ponds, glaciers > 1 km^{2} (0.386 sq mi or 247 acres) and river estuaries.

Quinson (French pronunciation: [kɛ̃sɔ̃]; Occitan: Quinçon) is a commune in the Alpes-de-Haute-Provence department in southeastern France.

== History ==
=== Prehistory ===
In the nearby Gorges du Verdon, there are a number of caves (known as "baumes"), which were occupied intermittently for over 400,000 years. The most significant of these caves is the "Baume Bonne", which has been studied by various archaeologists, including Henry de Lumley.

The Baume Bonne was occupied first during the end of the Lower Paleolithic, 400,000 years ago. It was occupied again 150–300,000 years ago. Tools made using the Levallois technique have been found dating from this era. Neanderthals inhabited the caves later, around 130,000 years ago. Remains of cave bears dating from this period have been found. The Neanderthals were eventually succeeded by Cro-Magnon men, who occupied the cave during the Upper Paleolithic. Finally, modern humans lived in the cave during Neolithic.

== Population ==
Historical population
Year	Pop.	±% p.a.
1968	225	—
1975	251	+1.57%
1982	232	−1.12%
1990	274	+2.10%
1999	350	+2.76%
2007	430	+2.61%
2012	443	+0.60%
2017	417	−1.20%
2023	368	−2.06%
Source: INSEE

== See also ==
- Coteaux de Pierrevert AOC
- Communes of the Alpes-de-Haute-Provence department
