= Canton of Manosque-3 =

Coordinates: 43.83°N 5.79°E

Manosque-3
- Canton
- Interactive map of Manosque-3
- Country: France
- Region: Provence-Alpes-Côte d'Azur
- Department: Alpes-de-Haute-Provence
- No. of communes: {{{nbcomm}}}
- Population (2023): 12,670
- INSEE code: 04 09

The canton of Manosque-3 (before March 2015: Manosque-Sud-Est) is an administrative division in southeastern France. It consists of the southern part of the commune of Manosque and its southern suburbs. It includes the following communes:

1. Corbières-en-Provence
2. Manosque (partly)
3. Sainte-Tulle

== Demographics ==
Historical population
Year	Pop.	±% p.a.
2013	12,065	—
2018	12,172	+0.18%
Source: INSEE

== See also ==
- Cantons of the Alpes-de-Haute-Provence department
