= Esparron-de-Verdon =

Esparron-de-Verdon Esparron de Verdon (Occitan)
- Commune
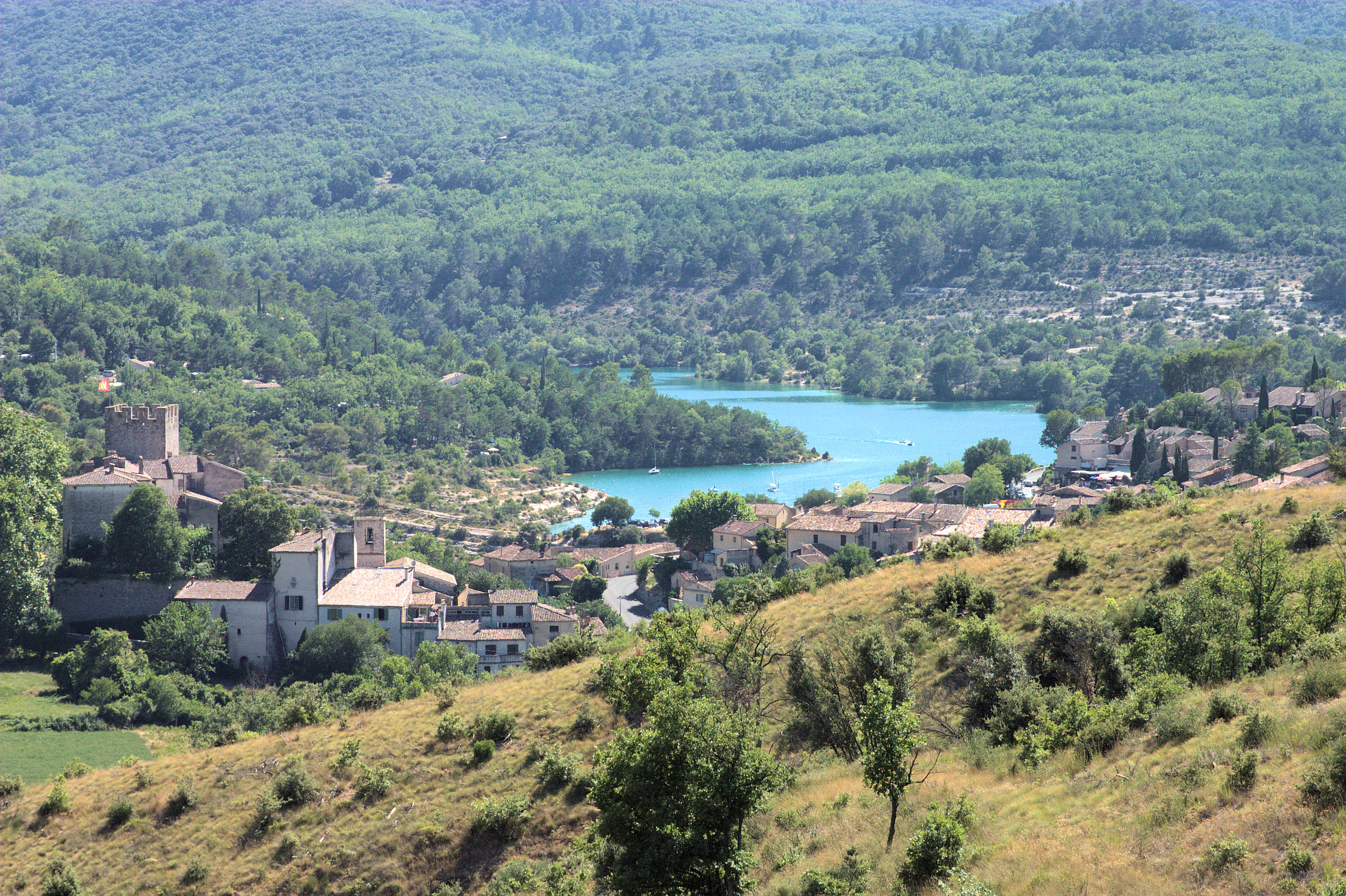
- A general view of Esparron-de-Verdon

- Coat of arms
- Location of Esparron-de-Verdon
- Location within France Location within Provence-Alpes-Côte d'Azur
- Coordinates: 43°44′23″N 5°58′20″E
- Country: France
- Region: Provence-Alpes-Côte d'Azur
- Department: Alpes-de-Haute-Provence
- Arrondissement: Forcalquier
- Canton: Valensole
- Intercommunality: Durance-Luberon-Verdon Agglomération

Government
  - Mayor (2026–32): Jean-Marc Vibert
- Area^{1}: 34.2 km^{2} (13.2 sq mi)
- Elevation: 386 m (1,266 ft)
- Highest elevation: 585 m (1,919 ft)
- Lowest elevation: 307 m (1,007 ft)
- Population (2023): 379
  - Density: 11.1/km^{2} (28.7/sq mi)
- Time zone: UTC+01:00 (CET)
  - Summer (DST): UTC+02:00 (CEST)
- INSEE/Postal code: 04081 /04800
- ^{1} French Land Register data, which excludes lakes, ponds, glaciers > 1 km^{2} (0.386 sq mi or 247 acres) and river estuaries.

Esparron-de-Verdon (French pronunciation: [ɛspaʁɔ̃ də vɛʁdɔ̃], lit. "Esparron of Verdon"; Occitan: Esparron de Verdon) is a commune in the Alpes-de-Haute-Provence department in the Provence-Alpes-Côte d'Azur region in Southeastern France. It is on the departmental border with Var, to the west of the Lake of Sainte-Croix.

== Demographics ==
Historical population
Year	Pop.	±% p.a.
1968	103	—
1975	118	+1.96%
1982	206	+8.29%
1990	290	+4.37%
1999	312	+0.82%
2007	427	+4.00%
2012	422	−0.24%
2017	398	−1.16%
2023	379	−0.81%
Source: INSEE

== See also ==
- Communes of the Alpes-de-Haute-Provence department
