= Coteaux de Pierrevert AOC =

French wine geographic appellation

Coteaux de Pierrevert (wine region)
- Wine region
- Type: Appelation d'origine contrôlée
- Year established: VDQS 1959; AOC 1998
- Years of wine industry: over 2,000
- Country: France
- Part of: Provence
- Climate region: Mediterranean with cool alpine winds
- Soil conditions: calcerous marl, Mio-pliocene sands and pebblesr
- Size of planted vineyards: 338
- No. of vineyards: 32
- Grapes produced: Grenache noir, Syrah, Carignan, Cinsault, Grenache blanc, Vermentino, Ugni blanc, Clairette, Rousanne
- No. of wineries: 9
- Wine produced: red, white, rosé
- Comments: 2007

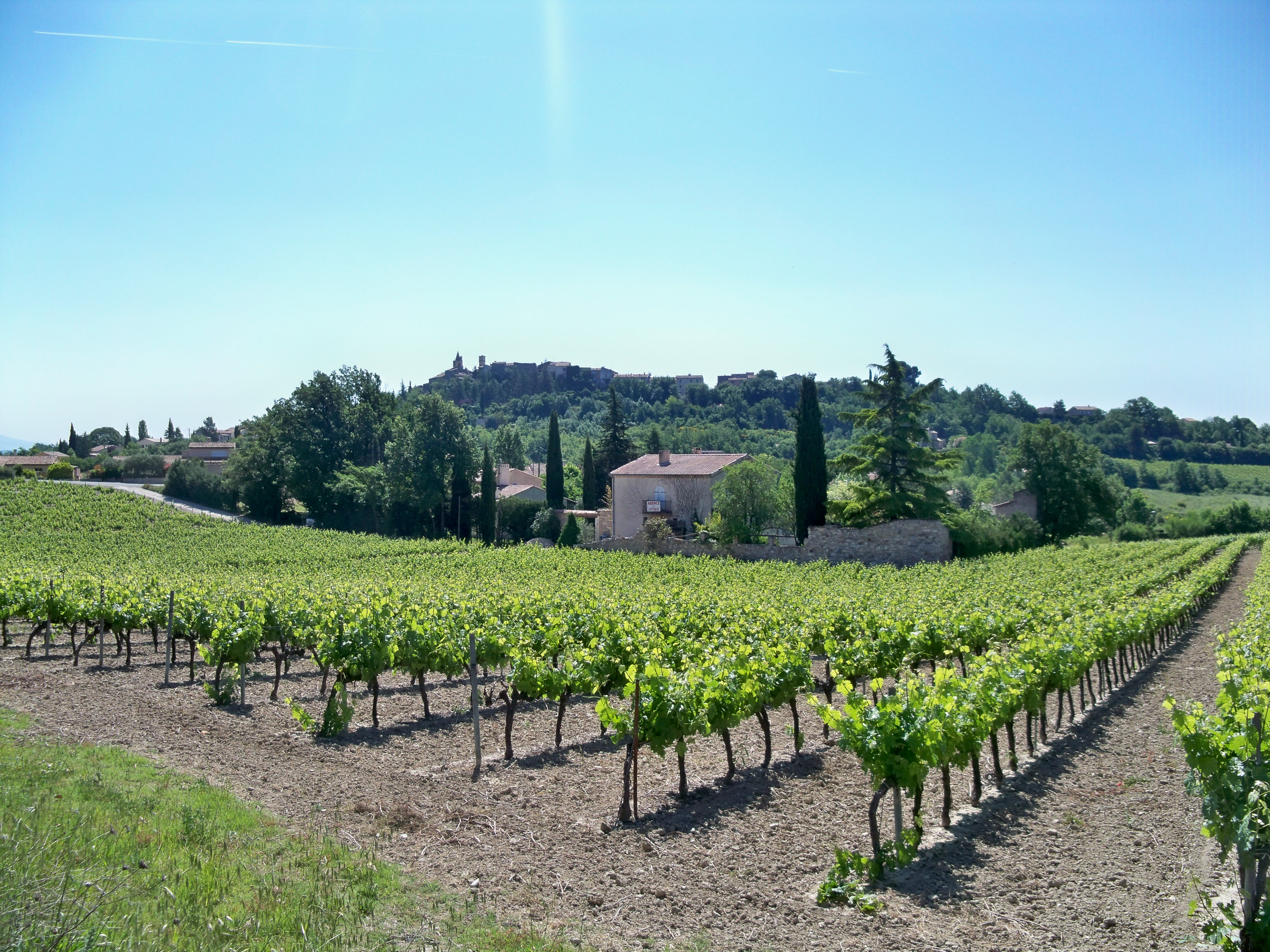
Vineyards in Pierrevert, France

Coteaux de Pierrevert (French pronunciation: [kɔto də pjɛʁvɛʁ]) is a wine-growing AOC in the western part of the Provence wine region of France, where the wines are produced in 11 communes of the Alpes-de-Haute-Provence département. It is partly located in the valley of the Durance river in the region of Manosque which is the northern part of Provence, it is considered by the INAO however, to be an eastern extremity of the southern Rhône Valley.

Since 2011, it has been known as Pierrevert AOP instead of Coteaux de Pierrevert.

== Wines ==
Red wines are made from Grenache noir and Syrah which must account for 70% together with a minimum of 30% of each. Secondary varieties are Cinsault, Mourvedre and Carignan.
Rosé: Grenache noir minimum 50%, and Syrah 20% minimum. Other secondary varieties are allowed with a maximum of 20% white grapes.
White wines from Clairette blanche, Grenache blanc, Ugni blanc, Roussanne of which no variety may exceed 70% together to a maximum of 20%. Grenache blanc and Vermentino must together represent a minimum of 25%.
Rosés and whites should be consumed soon after bottling, while the reds can age up to a maximum of five years .

== Economy ==
The Coteaux de Pierrevert wines are produced by a total of 35 concerns which include 32 growers, 6 private wineries, 2 cooperative wineries, and one producer/merchant.

The vineyards are in the communes of Corbières, Gréoux-les-Bains, Manosque, Montfuron, Pierrevert, Quinson, Saint-Laurent-du-Verdon, Saint-Martin-de-Brômes, Sainte-Tulle, Villeneuve, and Volx.

== See also ==
- French wine
