= Villeneuve, Alpes-de-Haute-Provence =

Villeneuve
- Commune
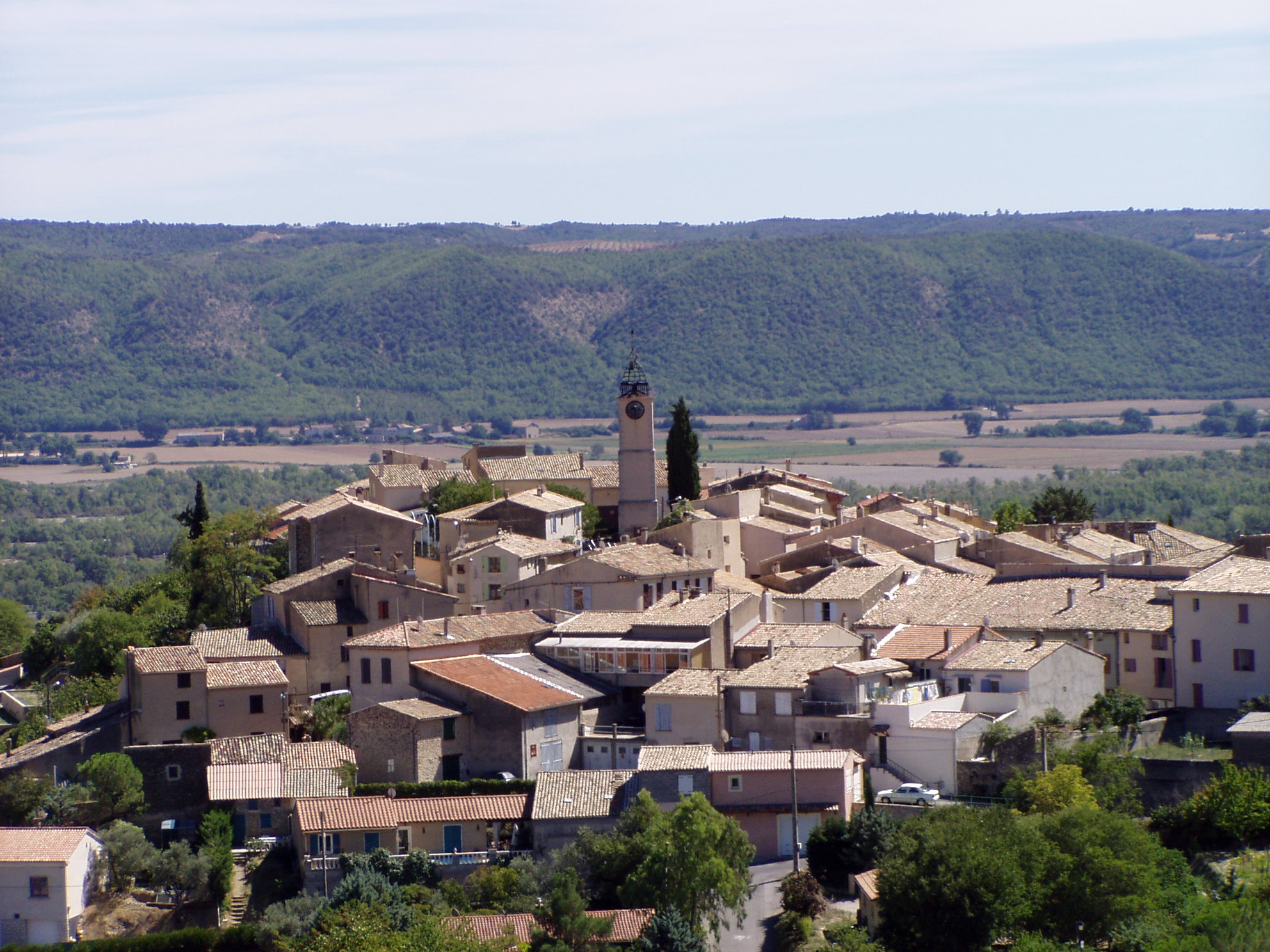
- The church and surrounding buildings in Villeneuve

- Coat of arms
- Location of Villeneuve
- Location within France Location within Provence-Alpes-Côte d'Azur
- Coordinates: 43°53′42″N 5°51′49″E
- Country: France
- Region: Provence-Alpes-Côte d'Azur
- Department: Alpes-de-Haute-Provence
- Arrondissement: Forcalquier
- Canton: Oraison
- Intercommunality: Durance-Luberon-Verdon Agglomération

Government
  - Mayor (2026–32): Serge Faudrin
- Area^{1}: 25.55 km^{2} (9.86 sq mi)
- Elevation: 450 m (1,480 ft)
- Highest elevation: 600 m (2,000 ft)
- Lowest elevation: 313 m (1,027 ft)
- Population (2023): 4,360
  - Density: 171/km^{2} (442/sq mi)
- Time zone: UTC+01:00 (CET)
  - Summer (DST): UTC+02:00 (CEST)
- INSEE/Postal code: 04242 /04180
- ^{1} French Land Register data, which excludes lakes, ponds, glaciers > 1 km^{2} (0.386 sq mi or 247 acres) and river estuaries.

Villeneuve (French pronunciation: [vilnœv]; Provençal: Vilanòva) is a commune in the Alpes-de-Haute-Provence department in southeastern France.

Villeneuve is located in Durance valley. This village, like many other villages in Provence, is built on the top of a hill to keep it protected from invaders. Villeneuve in French mean "New town" but was constructed in Middle Ages, originally further in the forest on the top of a high cliff. Only the little chapel remains on the rock to show where the original village was located.

== Population ==
Historical population

Year	Pop.	±% p.a.
1793	647	—
1800	720	+1.54%
1806	696	−0.56%
1821	806	+0.98%
1831	872	+0.79%
1836	846	−0.60%
1841	776	−1.71%
1846	783	+0.18%
1851	793	+0.25%
1856	778	−0.38%
1861	785	+0.18%
1866	731	−1.42%
1872	798	+1.47%
1876	745	−1.70%
1881	681	−1.78%
1886	600	−2.50%
1891	576	−0.81%
1896	577	+0.03%
1901	566	−0.38%

Year	Pop.	±% p.a.
1906	1,143	+15.09%
1911	605	−11.95%
1921	591	−0.23%
1926	537	−1.90%
1931	496	−1.58%
1936	575	+3.00%
1946	586	+0.19%
1954	575	−0.24%
1962	639	+1.33%
1968	861	+5.10%
1975	1,144	+4.14%
1982	1,730	+6.09%
1990	2,516	+4.79%
1999	2,964	+1.84%
2007	3,448	+1.91%
2012	3,713	+1.49%
2017	4,196	+2.48%
2023	4,360	+0.64%

Source: EHESS and INSEE (1968-2023)

== See also ==
- Coteaux de Pierrevert AOC
- Luberon
