= Canton of Valensole =

Coordinates: 43°50′20″N 5°59′04″E

Valensole
- Canton
- Interactive map of Valensole
- Country: France
- Region: Provence-Alpes-Côte d'Azur
- Department: Alpes-de-Haute-Provence
- No. of communes: {{{nbcomm}}}
- Area: 398.86 km^{2} (154.00 sq mi)
- Population (2023): 9,032
  - Density: 22.64/km^{2} (58.65/sq mi)
- INSEE code: 04 15

The canton of Valensole is an administrative division in southeastern France. At the French canton reorganisation which came into effect in March 2015, the canton was expanded from 4 to 10 communes:

1. Allemagne-en-Provence
2. Brunet
3. Esparron-de-Verdon
4. Gréoux-les-Bains
5. Montagnac-Montpezat
6. Quinson
7. Sainte-Croix-du-Verdon
8. Saint-Laurent-du-Verdon
9. Saint-Martin-de-Brômes
10. Valensole

== Demographics ==
Historical population
Year	Pop.	±% p.a.
2013	8,744	—
2018	8,706	−0.09%
Source: INSEE

== See also ==
- Cantons of the Alpes-de-Haute-Provence department
- Communes of France
