= Montfuron =

- Commune
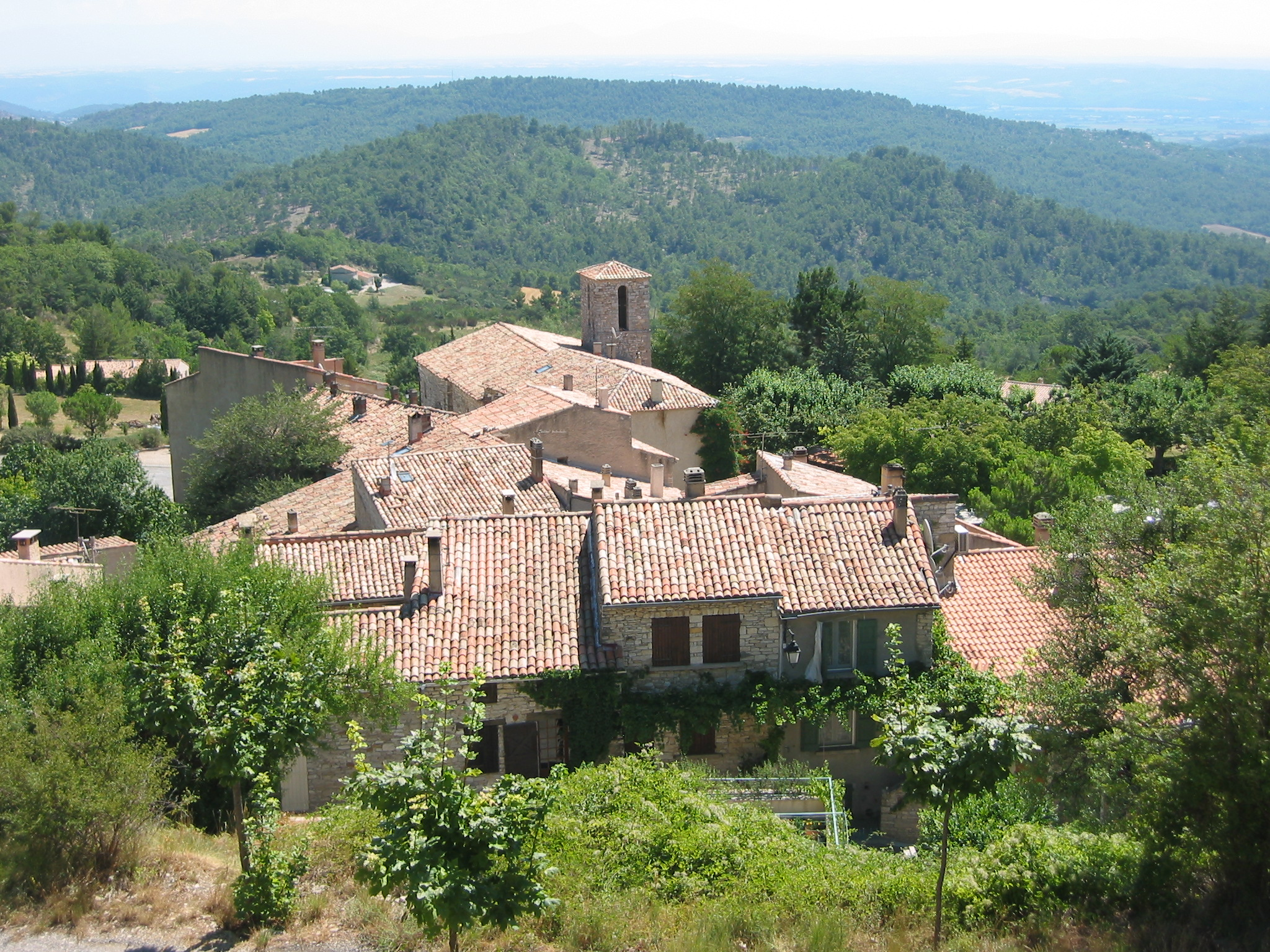
- The church and surrounding buildings in Montfuron

- Coat of arms
- Location of Montfuron
- Location within France Location within Provence-Alpes-Côte d'Azur
- Coordinates: 43°50′12″N 5°41′41″E
- Country: France
- Region: Provence-Alpes-Côte d'Azur
- Department: Alpes-de-Haute-Provence
- Arrondissement: Forcalquier
- Canton: Manosque-1
- Intercommunality: Durance-Luberon-Verdon Agglomération

Government
  - Mayor (2026–32): Bastien Teissier
- Area^{1}: 18.88 km^{2} (7.29 sq mi)
- Elevation: 650 m (2,130 ft)
- Highest elevation: 706 m (2,316 ft)
- Lowest elevation: 373 m (1,224 ft)
- Population (2023): 217
  - Density: 11.5/km^{2} (29.8/sq mi)
- Time zone: UTC+01:00 (CET)
  - Summer (DST): UTC+02:00 (CEST)
- INSEE/Postal code: 04128 /04110
- ^{1} French Land Register data, which excludes lakes, ponds, glaciers > 1 km^{2} (0.386 sq mi or 247 acres) and river estuaries.

Montfuron (French pronunciation: [mɔ̃fyʁɔ̃]) is a commune in the Alpes-de-Haute-Provence department in southeastern France.

== Population ==
Historical population
Year	Pop.	±% p.a.
1968	86	—
1975	79	−1.21%
1982	156	+10.21%
1990	149	−0.57%
1999	166	+1.21%
2007	199	+2.29%
2012	204	+0.50%
2017	210	+0.58%
2023	217	+0.55%
Source: INSEE

== See also ==
- Luberon
- Coteaux de Pierrevert AOC
- Communes of the Alpes-de-Haute-Provence department
