= Saint-Martin-de-Brômes =

Saint-Martin-de-Brômes Sant Martin de Bromes (Occitan)
- Commune
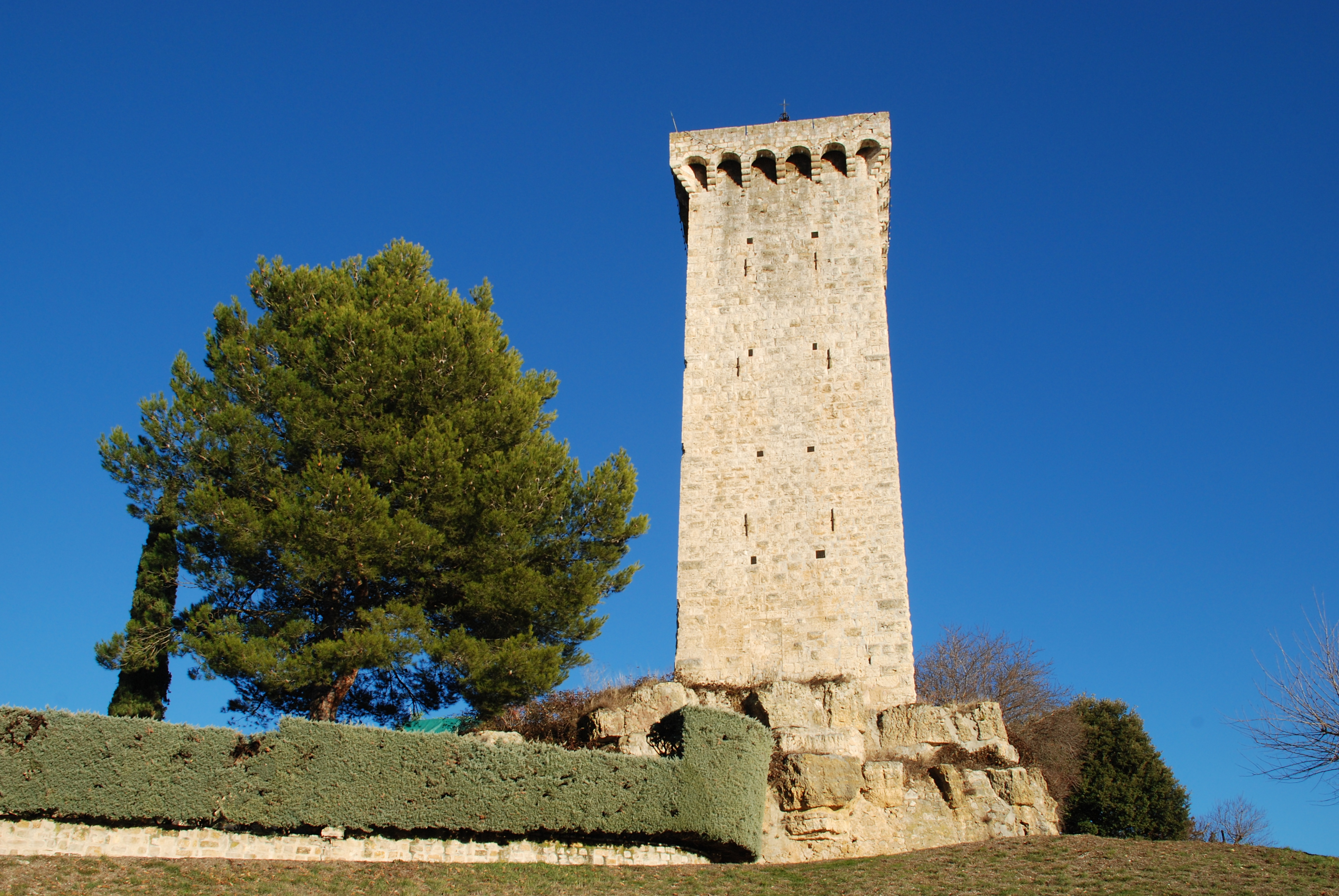
- Clock tower

- Coat of arms
- Location of Saint-Martin-de-Brômes
- Location within France Location within Provence-Alpes-Côte d'Azur
- Coordinates: 43°46′15″N 5°56′46″E
- Country: France
- Region: Provence-Alpes-Côte d'Azur
- Department: Alpes-de-Haute-Provence
- Arrondissement: Forcalquier
- Canton: Valensole
- Intercommunality: Durance-Luberon-Verdon Agglomération

Government
  - Mayor (2026–32): Laurence Depieds
- Area^{1}: 21.09 km^{2} (8.14 sq mi)
- Highest elevation: 588 m (1,929 ft)
- Lowest elevation: 307 m (1,007 ft)
- Population (2023): 625
  - Density: 29.6/km^{2} (76.8/sq mi)
- Time zone: UTC+01:00 (CET)
  - Summer (DST): UTC+02:00 (CEST)
- INSEE/Postal code: 04189 /04800
- ^{1} French Land Register data, which excludes lakes, ponds, glaciers > 1 km^{2} (0.386 sq mi or 247 acres) and river estuaries.

Saint-Martin-de-Brômes (French pronunciation: [sɛ̃ maʁtɛ̃ də bʁom]; Provençal Occitan: Sant Martin de Bromes) is a commune in the southwestern part of the Alpes-de-Haute-Provence department in the Provence-Alpes-Côte d'Azur region in Southeastern France. It lies on the small river Colostre, a right tributary of the Verdon, which marks the departmental border with Var.

== Demographics ==
Historical population
Year	Pop.	±% p.a.
1968	222	—
1975	217	−0.32%
1982	244	+1.69%
1990	339	+4.20%
1999	403	+1.94%
2007	485	+2.34%
2012	554	+2.70%
2017	590	+1.27%
2023	625	+0.97%
Source: INSEE

== See also ==
- Coteaux de Pierrevert AOC
- Communes of the Alpes-de-Haute-Provence department
