= Saint-Laurent-du-Verdon =

Saint-Laurent-du-Verdon Sant Laurenç de Verdon (Occitan)
- Commune
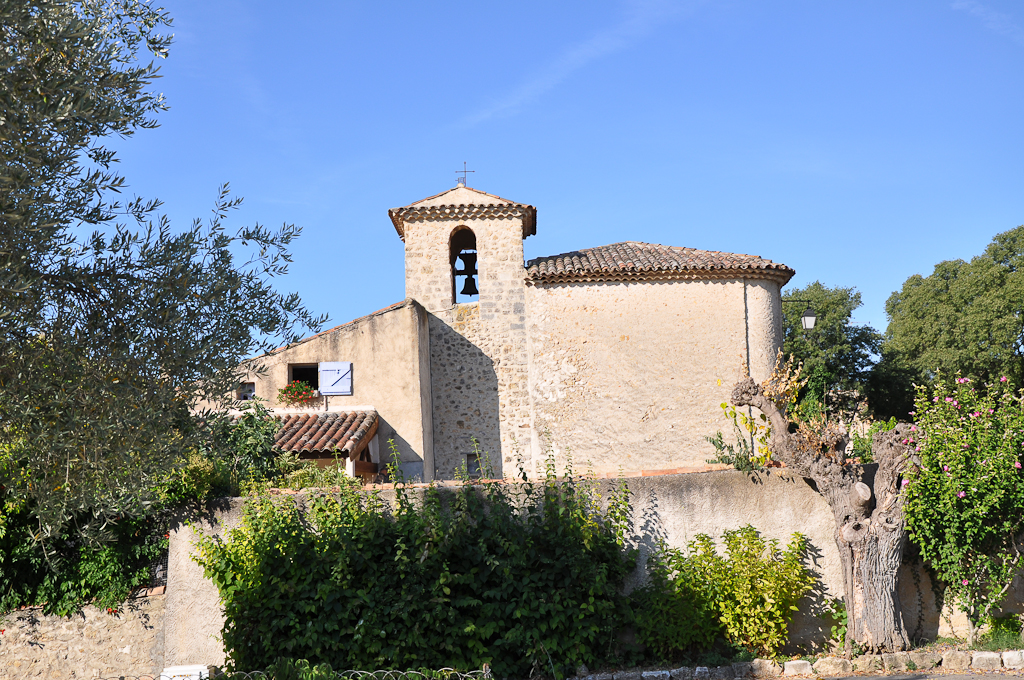
- The Romanesque chapel in Saint-Laurent-du-Verdon

- Coat of arms
- Location of Saint-Laurent-du-Verdon
- Location within France Location within Provence-Alpes-Côte d'Azur
- Coordinates: 43°43′30″N 6°04′07″E
- Country: France
- Region: Provence-Alpes-Côte d'Azur
- Department: Alpes-de-Haute-Provence
- Arrondissement: Forcalquier
- Canton: Valensole
- Intercommunality: Durance-Luberon-Verdon Agglomération

Government
  - Mayor (2026–32): Nadine Grillon
- Area^{1}: 8.89 km^{2} (3.43 sq mi)
- Elevation: 468 m (1,535 ft)
- Highest elevation: 581 m (1,906 ft)
- Lowest elevation: 394 m (1,293 ft)
- Population (2023): 82
  - Density: 9.2/km^{2} (24/sq mi)
- Time zone: UTC+01:00 (CET)
  - Summer (DST): UTC+02:00 (CEST)
- INSEE/Postal code: 04186 /04500
- ^{1} French Land Register data, which excludes lakes, ponds, glaciers > 1 km^{2} (0.386 sq mi or 247 acres) and river estuaries.

Saint-Laurent-du-Verdon (French pronunciation: [sɛ̃ loʁɑ̃ dy vɛʁdɔ̃], lit. "Saint-Laurent of the Verdon"; Occitan: Sant Laurenç de Verdon) is a commune in the Alpes-de-Haute-Provence department in the Provence-Alpes-Côte d'Azur region in Southeastern France. It is on the right bank of the river Verdon, which marks the departmental border with Var.

== Demographics ==
Historical population
Year	Pop.	±% p.a.
1968	52	—
1975	53	+0.27%
1982	59	+1.54%
1990	71	+2.34%
1999	74	+0.46%
2007	93	+2.90%
2012	89	−0.88%
2017	97	+1.74%
2023	82	−2.76%
Source: INSEE

== See also ==
- Coteaux de Pierrevert AOC
- Communes of the Alpes-de-Haute-Provence department
