= Gréoux-les-Bains =

Commune in Provence-Alpes-Côte d'Azur, France

Gréoux-les-Bains Grèus (Occitan)
- Commune
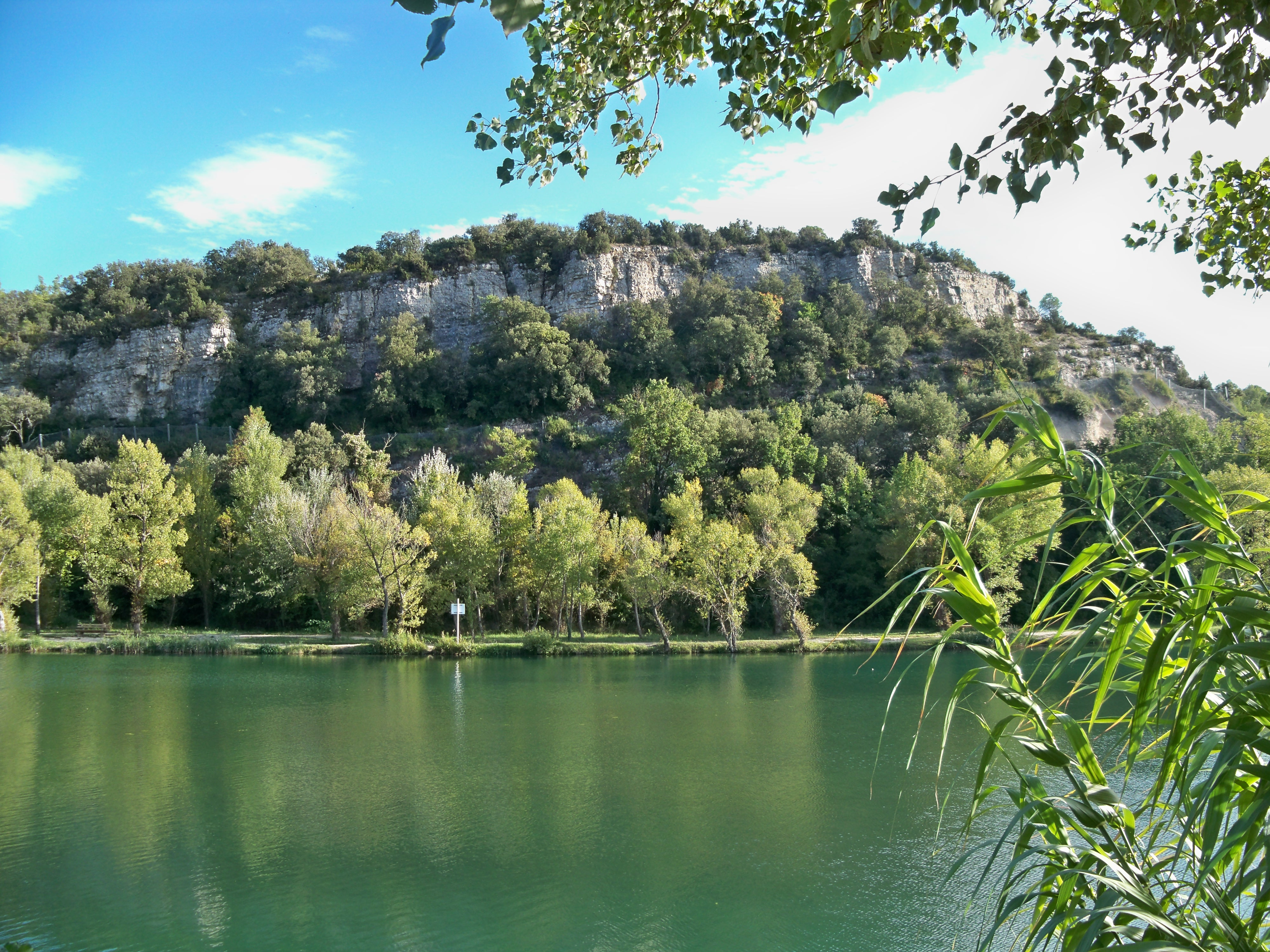
- A view of the river Verdon to the south of the town of Gréoux-les-Bains

- Coat of arms
- Location of Gréoux-les-Bains
- Location within France Location within Provence-Alpes-Côte d'Azur
- Coordinates: 43°45′33″N 5°53′03″E
- Country: France
- Region: Provence-Alpes-Côte d'Azur
- Department: Alpes-de-Haute-Provence
- Arrondissement: Forcalquier
- Canton: Valensole
- Intercommunality: Durance-Luberon-Verdon Agglomération

Government
  - Mayor (2026–32): Paul Audan
- Area^{1}: 69.46 km^{2} (26.82 sq mi)
- Elevation: 400 m (1,300 ft)
- Highest elevation: 571 m (1,873 ft)
- Lowest elevation: 268 m (879 ft)
- Population (2023): 3,084
  - Density: 44.40/km^{2} (115.0/sq mi)
- Time zone: UTC+01:00 (CET)
  - Summer (DST): UTC+02:00 (CEST)
- INSEE/Postal code: 04094 /04800
- ^{1} French Land Register data, which excludes lakes, ponds, glaciers > 1 km^{2} (0.386 sq mi or 247 acres) and river estuaries.

Gréoux-les-Bains (French pronunciation: [ɡʁeu le bɛ̃]; Provençal Occitan: Greù) is a commune in the Alpes-de-Haute-Provence department in the Provence-Alpes-Côte d'Azur region in Southeastern France. Best known for its Château des Templiers, the town is on the right bank of the river Verdon, on the departmental border with Var.

== Demographics ==
Historical population

Year	Pop.	±% p.a.
1793	1,180	—
1806	1,471	+1.71%
1821	1,419	−0.24%
1831	1,432	+0.09%
1836	1,337	−1.36%
1841	1,374	+0.55%
1846	1,368	−0.09%
1851	1,404	+0.52%
1856	1,356	−0.69%
1861	1,400	+0.64%
1866	1,356	−0.64%
1872	1,378	+0.27%
1876	1,260	−2.21%
1881	1,228	−0.51%
1886	1,283	+0.88%
1891	1,163	−1.94%
1896	1,092	−1.25%
1901	980	−2.14%

Year	Pop.	±% p.a.
1906	995	+0.30%
1911	1,022	+0.54%
1921	855	−1.77%
1926	835	−0.47%
1931	947	+2.55%
1936	950	+0.06%
1946	871	−0.86%
1954	782	−1.34%
1962	1,039	+3.62%
1968	1,182	+2.17%
1975	1,296	+1.32%
1982	1,635	+3.38%
1990	1,718	+0.62%
1999	1,921	+1.25%
2007	2,459	+3.13%
2012	2,589	+1.04%
2017	2,634	+0.35%
2023	3,084	+2.66%

Source: EHESS and INSEE (1968-2023)

== See also ==
- Coteaux de Pierrevert AOC
- Communes of the Alpes-de-Haute-Provence department
