= Montagnac-Montpezat =

- Commune
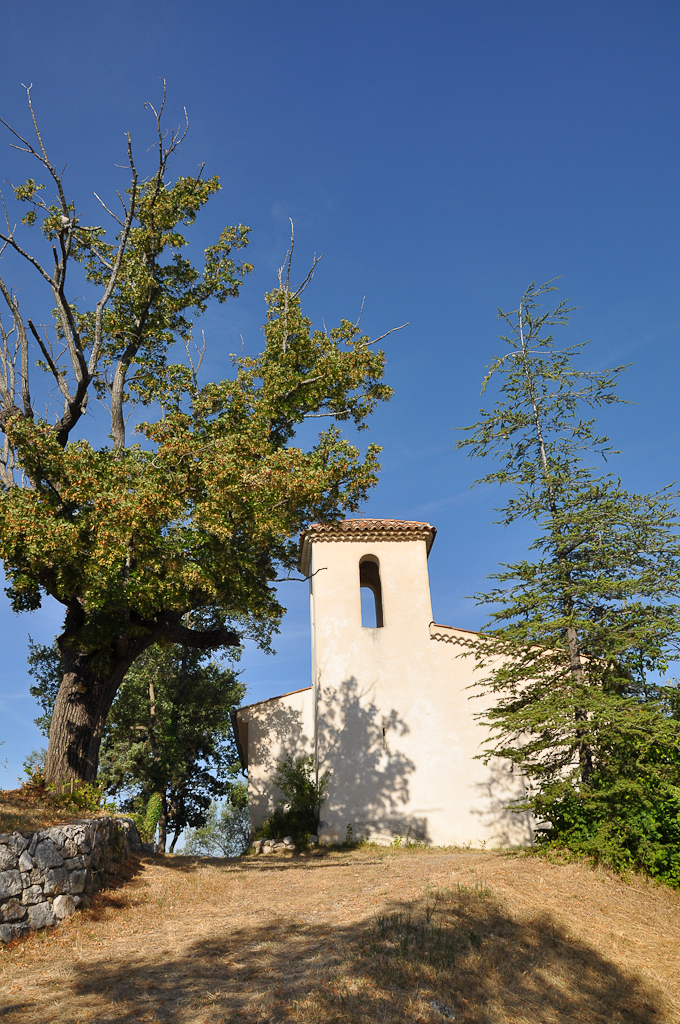
- The chapel in Montpezat

- Coat of arms
- Location of Montagnac-Montpezat
- Location within France Location within Provence-Alpes-Côte d'Azur
- Coordinates: 43°46′49″N 6°05′46″E
- Country: France
- Region: Provence-Alpes-Côte d'Azur
- Department: Alpes-de-Haute-Provence
- Arrondissement: Forcalquier
- Canton: Valensole
- Intercommunality: Durance-Luberon-Verdon Agglomération

Government
  - Mayor (2026–32): France Guieu-Lajoie
- Area^{1}: 34.18 km^{2} (13.20 sq mi)
- Elevation: 600 m (2,000 ft)
- Highest elevation: 653 m (2,142 ft)
- Lowest elevation: 394 m (1,293 ft)
- Population (2023): 401
  - Density: 11.7/km^{2} (30.4/sq mi)
- Time zone: UTC+01:00 (CET)
  - Summer (DST): UTC+02:00 (CEST)
- INSEE/Postal code: 04124 /04500
- ^{1} French Land Register data, which excludes lakes, ponds, glaciers > 1 km^{2} (0.386 sq mi or 247 acres) and river estuaries.

Montagnac-Montpezat (French pronunciation: [mɔ̃taɲak mɔ̃pəza]; Occitan: Montanhac e Montpesat) is a commune in the Alpes-de-Haute-Provence department in southeastern France.

== Population ==
Historical population
Year	Pop.	±% p.a.
1968	193	—
1975	162	−2.47%
1982	215	+4.13%
1990	279	+3.31%
1999	321	+1.57%
2007	409	+3.07%
2012	411	+0.10%
2017	424	+0.62%
2023	401	−0.93%
Source: INSEE

== See also ==
- Communes of the Alpes-de-Haute-Provence department
