= Valensole =

Valensole Valençòla (Occitan)
- Commune
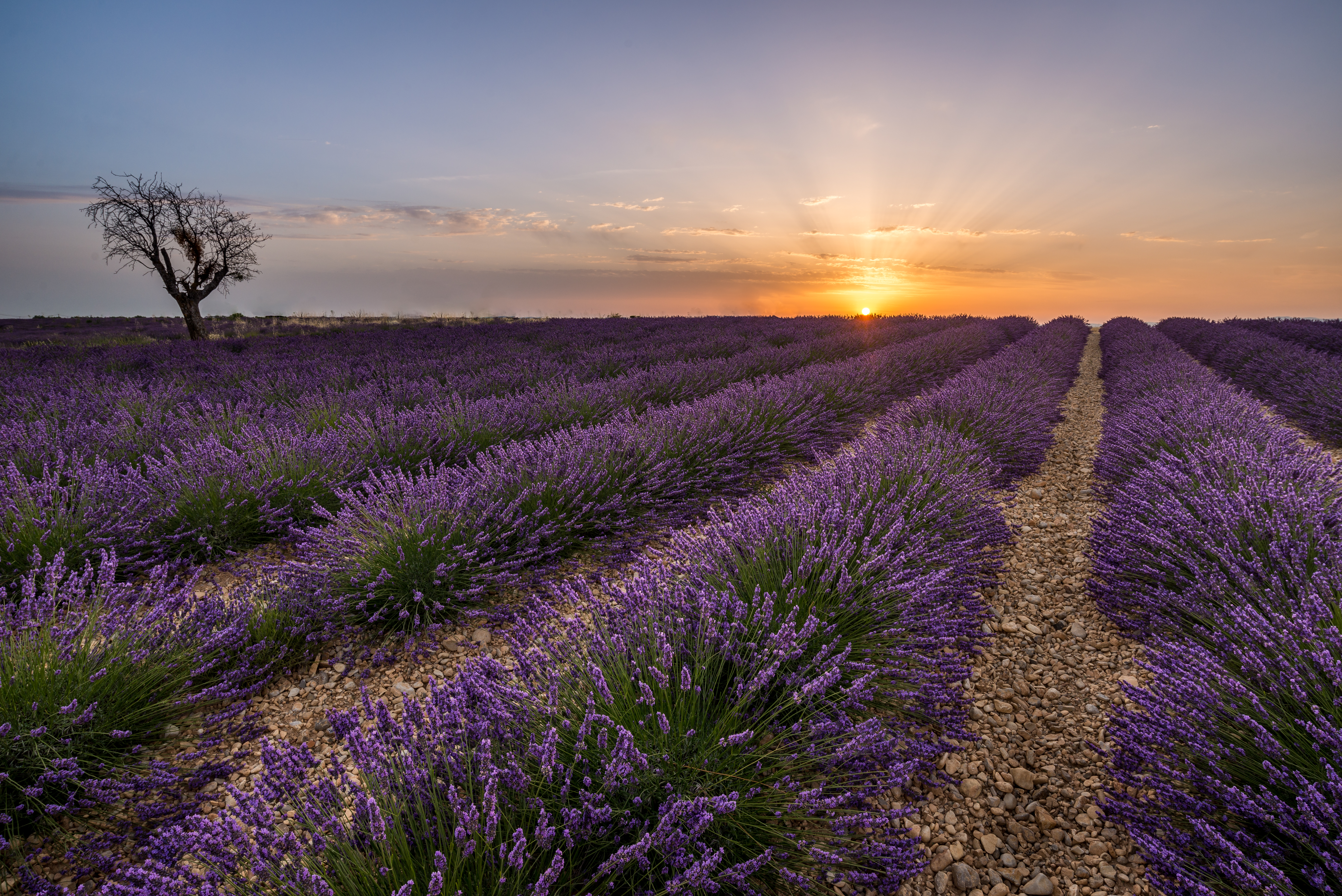
- Lavender fields in Valensole

- Coat of arms
- Location of Valensole
- Location within France Location within Provence-Alpes-Côte d'Azur
- Coordinates: 43°50′20″N 5°59′04″E
- Country: France
- Region: Provence-Alpes-Côte d'Azur
- Department: Alpes-de-Haute-Provence
- Arrondissement: Forcalquier
- Canton: Valensole
- Intercommunality: Durance-Luberon-Verdon Agglomération

Government
  - Mayor (2026–32): Gérard Aurric
- Area^{1}: 127.77 km^{2} (49.33 sq mi)
- Elevation: 595 m (1,952 ft)
- Highest elevation: 651 m (2,136 ft)
- Lowest elevation: 290 m (950 ft)
- Population (2023): 3,137
  - Density: 24.55/km^{2} (63.59/sq mi)
- Time zone: UTC+01:00 (CET)
  - Summer (DST): UTC+02:00 (CEST)
- INSEE/Postal code: 04230 /04210
- ^{1} French Land Register data, which excludes lakes, ponds, glaciers > 1 km^{2} (0.386 sq mi or 247 acres) and river estuaries.

Valensole (French pronunciation: [valɑ̃sɔl]; Occitan: Valençòla) is a commune in the Alpes-de-Haute-Provence department in the southeastern Provence-Alpes-Côte d'Azur region of France. Its inhabitants are called Valensolais (masculine) and Valensolaises (feminine). The commune numbered 3,173 inhabitants as of 2019.

== Geography ==
The city itself, at 595 metres above sea level, is formed by an amphitheater on a hill between the Plateau de Valensole and the valley of Notre Dame. The commune is one of the most expansive of the region and contains many hamlets.

The river Asse forms most of the commune's northern border, then flows into the Durance, which forms all of its western border.

=== Geology ===
The beginning of the Tertiary era is marked by the lifting of the Pyrenees Mountains between 60 and 40 Ma. The repercussions of the lifting formed in the region of Valensole big mountains and little mountainous chains : Lure, Ventoux, Luberon, Nerthe, Étoile..., oriented east-west. During the Pyrenean raising, the Durance fault was active. The west lowered and the east raised, demarcating a vast river-lake zone : the Forcalquier basin, that receives, among others, the sediments coming from the east zone. For 15 thousand years, the Alps continue their formation. The powerful geologic movements accentuate again the east-west fold of the Provencal chains and mountains. The Durance fault is demonstrated once again. The occidental zone raises while the oriental zone sunk, forming a large depression in which waters of the ancestral torrents flowed, coming from south of the Estérel-Corso-Sarde Mountains. These powerful rivers, fed by violent climate phenomenons, transport large quantities of materials : pebbles, sand, clay, soluble limestone, taken into the depression where they accumulate to form an enormous deposit of Valensole's "poudingues", resulting from thousands of years of erosion in a karst environment.

Toward 8 Ma, the Estérel-corso-sardre mountain collapsed, isolating Corsica and Sardinia from the continent, which profoundly modified the hydrographic network. The rivers of Base-Provence that flow toward the plateau of Valensole and toward the Mediterranean Sea. The filling has followed from 5 or 6 thousand years. The visit deposit of Valensole is constituted by layers of pebbles more or less crude without the origins and the currents. The pebbles are cemented in different ways between the following - deposits, compressions, which demarcate the last layers and the layers most crumbly. The height of these deposits reach 838 meters toward Fourevière on the limit of the commune of the Mées and of Puimichel (between Guillot and the Allemands), and 400 meters on the heights of Volonne. Under the weight of this mass of materials, the terrestrial exterior sunk, that provokes movements of the deposit edge.

The levels move, tumble, subside, provoking folds and faults. The accumulation of conglomerates of Valensole spreads out for around 10 thousand years. Toward 3 Ma, the filling-in stopped.

The rivers will rearrange their valleys through the poudingue and the pluvial, glacial, fluvial, erosion will cut the relief of the plateau in forming small valleys and hills.

=== Town planning ===
According to the terminology defined by Insee and the zoning published in 2020, Valensole is an urban municipality. It belongs to the monocommunal urban unit of Valensole, with 3,204 inhabitants in 2017, thus being an isolated town.

== Population ==
Historical population

Year	Pop.	±% p.a.
1793	3,532	—
1806	3,566	+0.07%
1821	3,281	−0.55%
1831	3,521	+0.71%
1836	3,284	−1.38%
1841	3,135	−0.92%
1846	3,049	−0.55%
1851	3,151	+0.66%
1856	3,134	−0.11%
1861	3,072	−0.40%
1866	3,021	−0.33%
1872	3,186	+0.89%
1876	3,065	−0.96%
1881	3,020	−0.30%
1886	2,907	−0.76%
1891	2,807	−0.70%
1896	2,624	−1.34%
1901	2,550	−0.57%

Year	Pop.	±% p.a.
1906	2,509	−0.32%
1911	2,357	−1.24%
1921	1,917	−2.05%
1926	1,924	+0.07%
1931	1,960	+0.37%
1936	1,966	+0.06%
1946	1,790	−0.93%
1954	1,784	−0.04%
1962	1,712	−0.51%
1968	1,791	+0.75%
1975	1,721	−0.57%
1982	1,944	+1.76%
1990	2,202	+1.57%
1999	2,334	+0.65%
2007	2,700	+1.84%
2012	3,280	+3.97%
2017	3,204	−0.47%
2023	3,137	−0.35%

Source: EHESS and INSEE (1968-2023)

== See also ==
- Communes of the Alpes-de-Haute-Provence department
