= Avance =

Avance may refer to:

- Avance (Durance), a tributary of the Durance, France
- Avance (Garonne), a tributary of the Garonne, France
- Avance, South Dakota, a ghost town
- Avance, a brand name of the medication acellular nerve allograft
- Avance (newspaper), a newspaper published in Nicaragua, the central organ of the Communist Party of Nicaragua
- Avance (non-profit organization)
