= Durance =

River in France

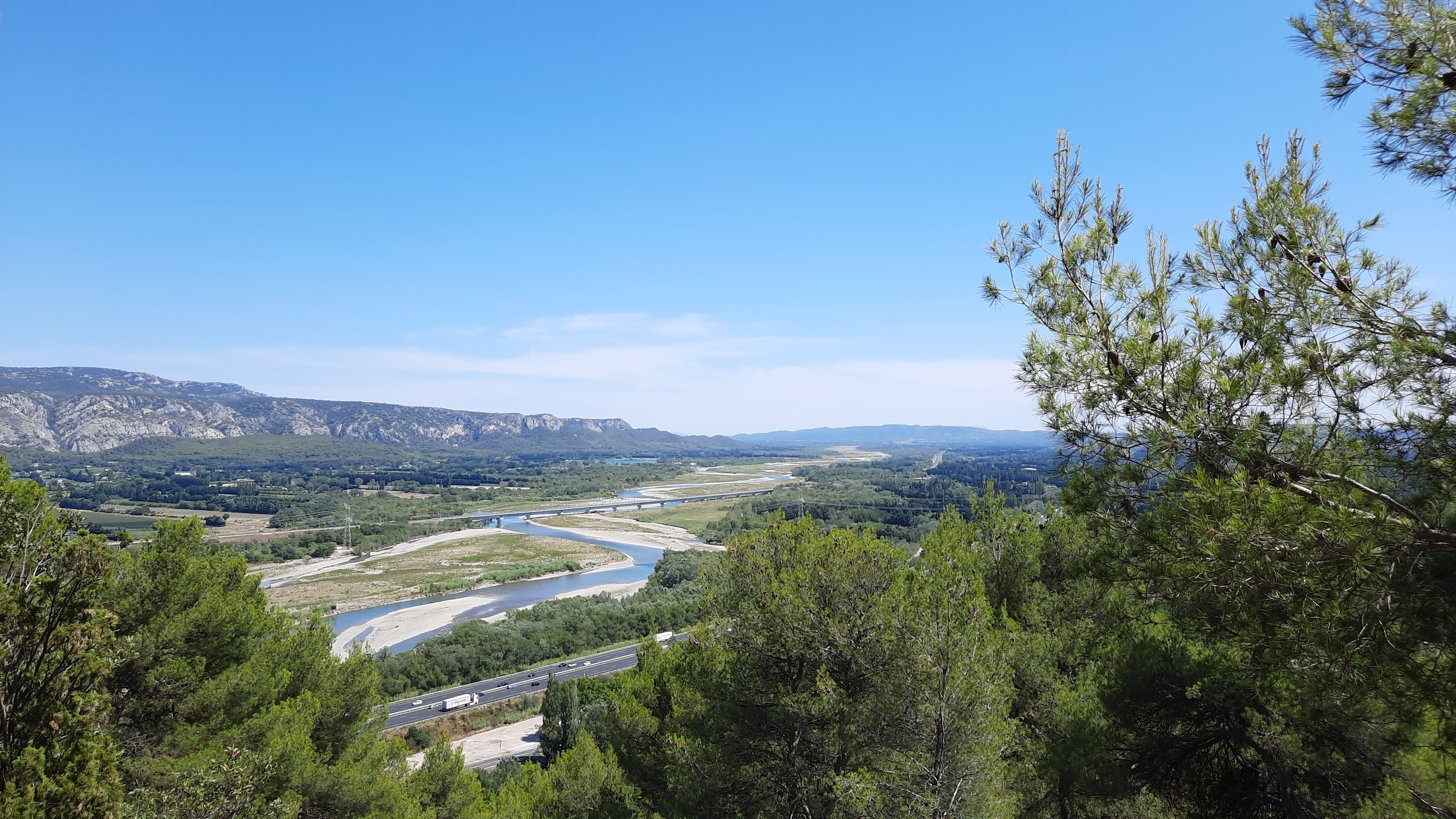
- A view of the Durance south of Cavaillon with the LGV Méditerranée viaduct

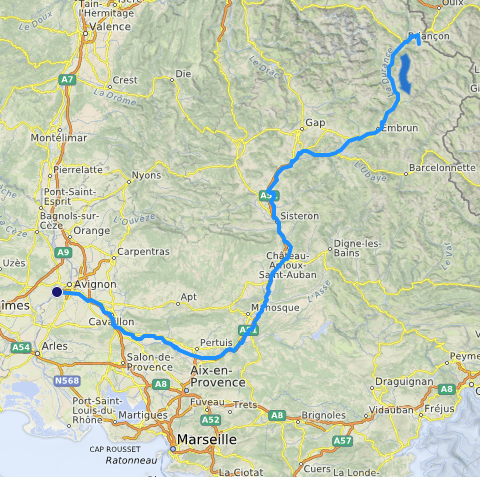

Location
- Country: France

Physical characteristics
- Source
  - location: Cottian Alps
  - elevation: 2,300 m (7,500 ft)
- Mouth
  - location: Rhône
  - coordinates: 43°55′21″N 4°44′35″E
- Length: 323 km (201 mi)
- Basin size: 14,472 km^{2} (5,588 sq mi)
- Discharge
  - average: 188 m^{3}/s (6,600 cu ft/s)

Basin features
- Progression: Rhône→ Mediterranean Sea

The Durance (French pronunciation: [dyʁɑ̃s]; Durença in the Occitan classical norm or Durènço in the Mistralian norm) is a major river in Southeastern France. A left tributary of the Rhône, it is 323.2 km (200.8 mi) long. Its drainage basin is 14,472 km^{2} (5,588 sq mi).

Its source is in the southwestern part of the Alps, in the Montgenèvre ski resort near Briançon; it flows southwest through the following departments and cities:

- Hautes-Alpes: Briançon, Embrun.
- Alpes-de-Haute-Provence: Sisteron, Manosque.
- Vaucluse: Cavaillon, Avignon.
- Bouches-du-Rhône.

The Durance's largest tributary is the Verdon. The Durance itself is a tributary of the Rhône and flows into the Rhône near Avignon. The Durance is the second longest (after the Saône) of the tributaries of the Rhône and the third largest in terms of its flow (after the Saône and Isère).

== Etymology ==
The Durance is documented as Druentia (1st c. AD), Drouéntios (Δρουέντιος; 2nd c. AD), Durantia (854) and Durentia (1127). The name Dru-ent-ia probably means 'the flowing one', stemming from the Proto-Indo-European root *dreu- ('to run, walk fast').

Similar names are found in the names of many rivers in the Western Alps and further: Dora in Italy, Dranse in Haute-Savoie, and the Drôme in south-eastern France. All these rivers have their sources in mountains, and are fast-running.

The Durance retains its name rather than either the Clarée or Guisane, even though the latter two are longer than the Durance when they each merge. The Durance is better known than the other two rivers because the Durance valley is an old and important trade route, whereas the valleys of the Clarée and Guisane are effectively dead ends.

== Hydrography ==
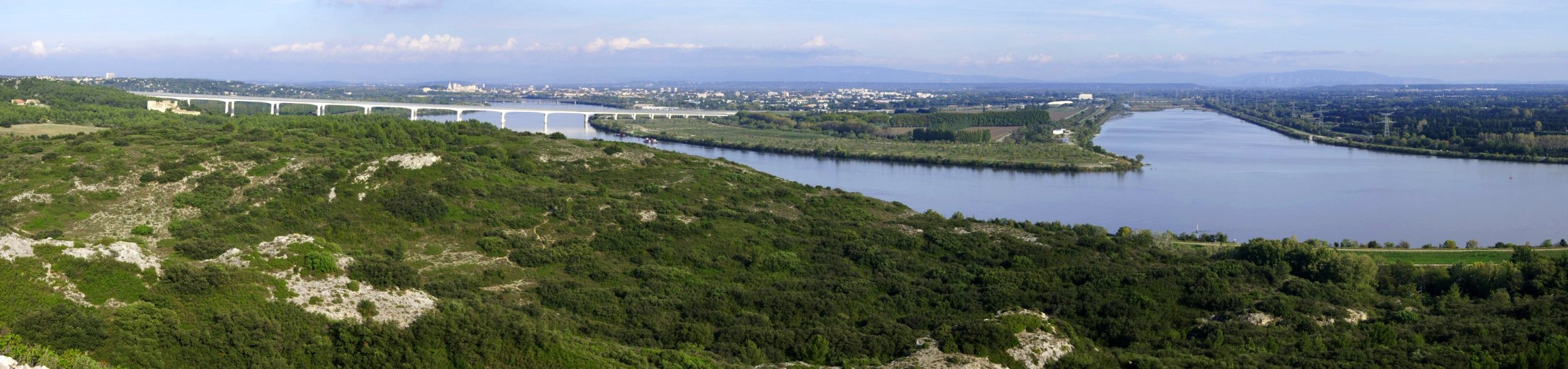
Confluence with the Rhône

The Durance is 305 kilometres (190 mi) long from its source at the foot of Sommet des Anges, at 2,390 metres (7,840 ft) high, above Montgenèvre, to its confluence with the Rhône. However, a longer route is traced by the Clarée-Durance system with a length of 325 kilometres (202 mi). Its descent is unusually rapid at 81 m/km (165 ft/mi) in its first 12 km (7.5 mi), then 15 m/km (30 ft/mi) to its confluence with the Gyronde, and then still nearly 8 m/km (16 ft/mi) to the confluence with the Ubaye. This descent stays relatively steep after this confluence, then shallows to approximately 0.33% in its middle course (to the Mirabeau bridge), then 0.24% in its lower course. For comparison, at approximately 100 kilometres (62 mi) from its source, the Isère is at 330 metres (1,080 ft) altitude and the Durance at 700 metres (2,300 ft), which contributes partially to its fast-flowing nature, including in the lower part of the river. It drops 1,847 metres (6,060 ft) from its source to Mirabeau and approximately 2,090 metres (6,860 ft) from its source to the confluence with the Rhône.

=== Departments and main towns crossed ===
The river only runs through the towns of Briançon and Sisteron — built where the banks are very steep — the other towns are built on slopes close to the river:

- Hautes-Alpes
  - Briançon
  - Embrun
- Alpes-de-Haute-Provence
  - Sisteron
  - Château-Arnoux-Saint-Auban
- Vaucluse
  - Pertuis
  - Cadenet
  - Cavaillon
- Bouches-du-Rhône
  - left bank of the Durance.

The Durance catchment area extends to three other departments: Var, Drôme and Alpes-Maritimes. The Durance is the longest river in Metropolitan France without a department named after it.

=== Source to Serre-Ponçon ===
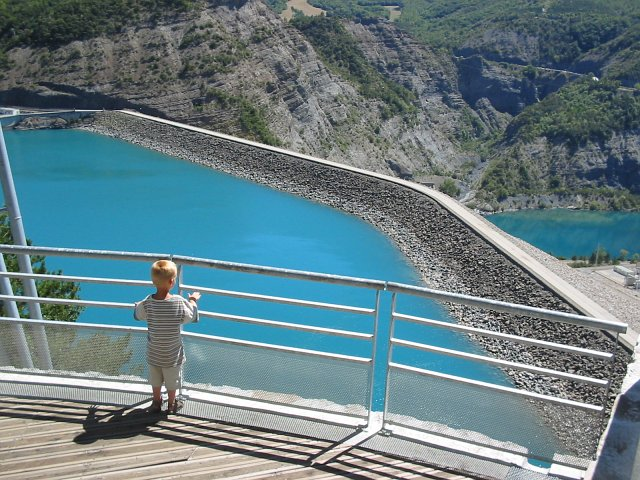
The dam at the Lac de Serre-Ponçon

The source of La Durance is on the northern slope of the Sommet des Anges, where the first small streams combine into a river. This runs near to Montgenèvre and then flows into the larger Clarée river, and then passes through Briançon before the Guisane joins it. It then continues south combining with the Gyronde — the Écrins glacial stream — at L'Argentière-la-Bessée. The confluence with the Guil occurs below Guillestre and Mont-Dauphin. The Durance then flows south-south-west and flows into the Lac de Serre-Ponçon just downstream of Embrun. The confluence with the Ubaye was flooded as the lake filled.

=== Middle section: from Serre-Ponçon to Mirabeau ===
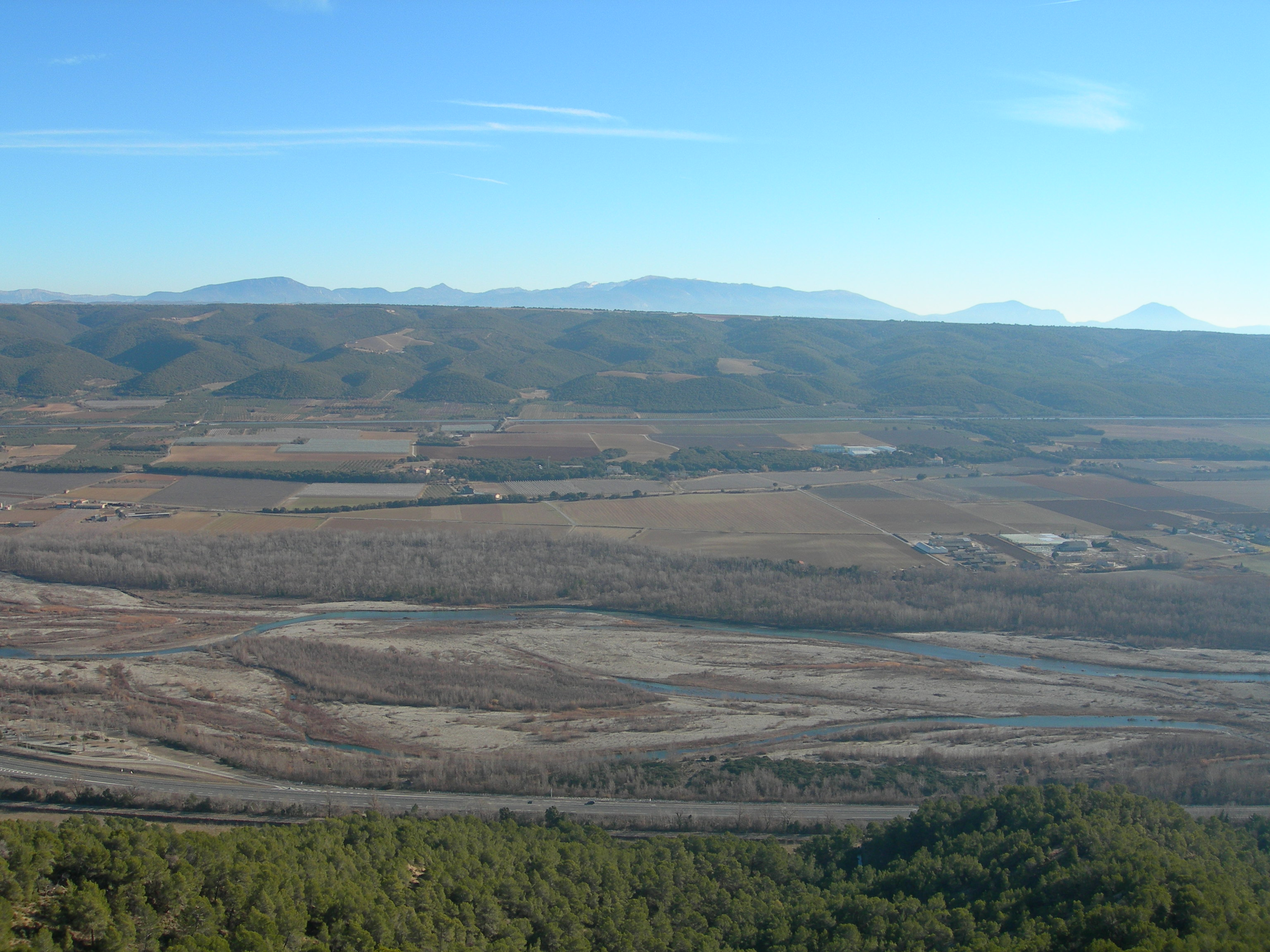
Durance Valley at Les Mées, in the northern part of Plateau de Valensole. In the background is the Mourre de Chanier mountain. The EDF Canal is the thin white line in the distance between the tree line and the base of the hills.

The middle part of the Durance runs through a landscape that changes as the valley increasingly widens. The river itself becomes steeply banked by terraces, and carves a channel, sometimes a few metres deep, sometimes tens of metres deep. In its middle and lower reaches the Durance is affected by the Mediterranean climate: flooding after autumnal rains, with low water levels in summer. Just before the narrow gap in the mountains at Sisteron, the Durance joins Buëch and the Sasse. Water also flows in from the EDF Canal.

Beyond Sisteron further rivers and streams join the Durance: Jabron, Vançon, Bléone near Les Mées and from the Asse (river) a few kilometres to the south of Oraison. The Verdon flows into the Durance near Cadarache. The valley widens still further into an alluvial plain several kilometres wide (5 kilometres (3.1 mi) near Manosque). Here the river was diverted for the development of modern agriculture and the construction of the A51 motorway.

There are several dams along the middle part of the Durance. In addition to main dam at Serre-Ponçon, there are dams at Espinasses, Sisteron, L'Escale and Cadarache. There are small canals whose primary purpose is to draw water from the river into the EDF Canal which in turn feeds the hydroelectric power stations. Some of the water diverted by the dams is used for irrigation.

=== Mirabeau to Avignon ===
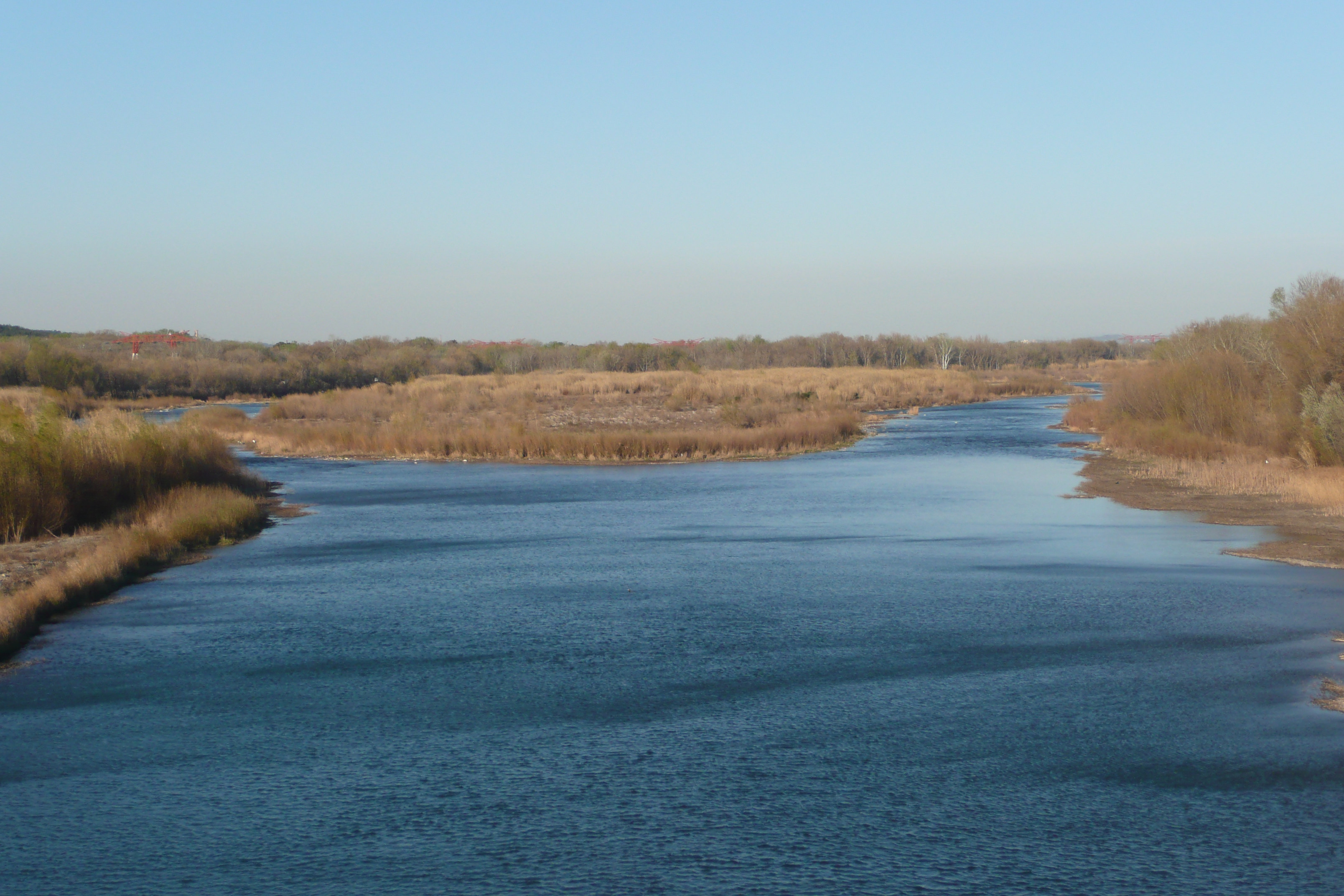
The Durance, close to Avignon

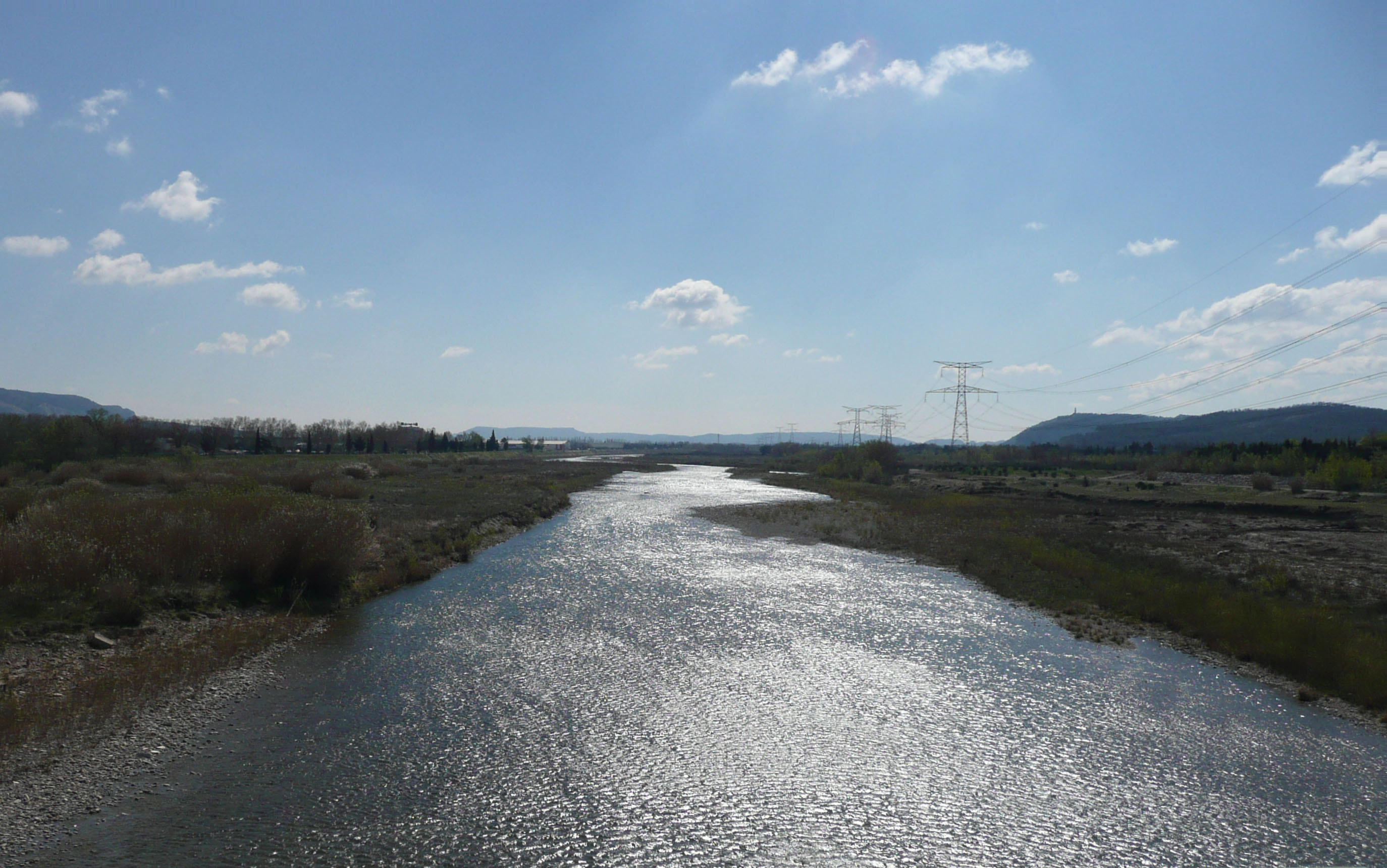
The Durance, close to Cavaillon

The valley narrows for a few kilometres until the water gap at Mirabeau, at a depth of 200 metres (660 ft), then widens again into an even broader plain until the confluence with the Rhône south of Avignon. Its direction changes from southerly to westerly then northwesterly, aligning with the small Provençal mountain ranges between which it flows (Alpilles and Luberon). The Durance receives only one significant tributary on this last part of its course: the Calavon, which flows around the Lubéron range to the north.

=== Summary of tributaries ===
This is a list of rivers longer than 20 kilometres (12 mi) that flow into the Durance. They are listed in order of the confluence, starting upstream.

- (MR) la Clarée;
- (R) la Guisane;
- (R) l'Onde;
- (R) la Gyronde;
- (R) la Biaysse;
- (L) le Merdanel;
- (L) le Guil;
- (R) le Couleau;
- (R) le Rabioux;
- (L) le Torrent de Boscodon;
- (R) le Torrent de Réallon;
- (L) l'Ubaye;
- (R) l'Avance;
- (R) la Luye;
- (R) le Rousine;
- (L) le Sasse;
- (R) le Buëch;
- (R) le Jabron;
- (L) le Vançon;
- (L) la Bléone;
- (L) le Rancure;
- (L) l'Asse;
- (R) la Largue ;
- (L) le Verdon;
- (R) l'Èze;
- (R) le Calavon (a.k.a. le Coulon)

(L) left bank tributary; (R) right bank tributary; (MR) main river, the name given to part of the water course taken into account in the calculation of its total length.

== Hydrology ==
The river is considered "capricious", alternating between the feared flash floods (called the third plague of Provence) and low water levels. The upper Durance is an alpine river with a flow ranging from 18 to 197 cubic metres per second (640 to 6,960 cu ft/s). Its total drainage area is 14,225 square kilometres (5,492 mi^{2}). At the confluence with Ubaye, salmon used to thrive, and trout were found up as far as Sisteron, before the development of the river. Later it becomes a Mediterranean river with the characteristic morphology.

=== Flow ===
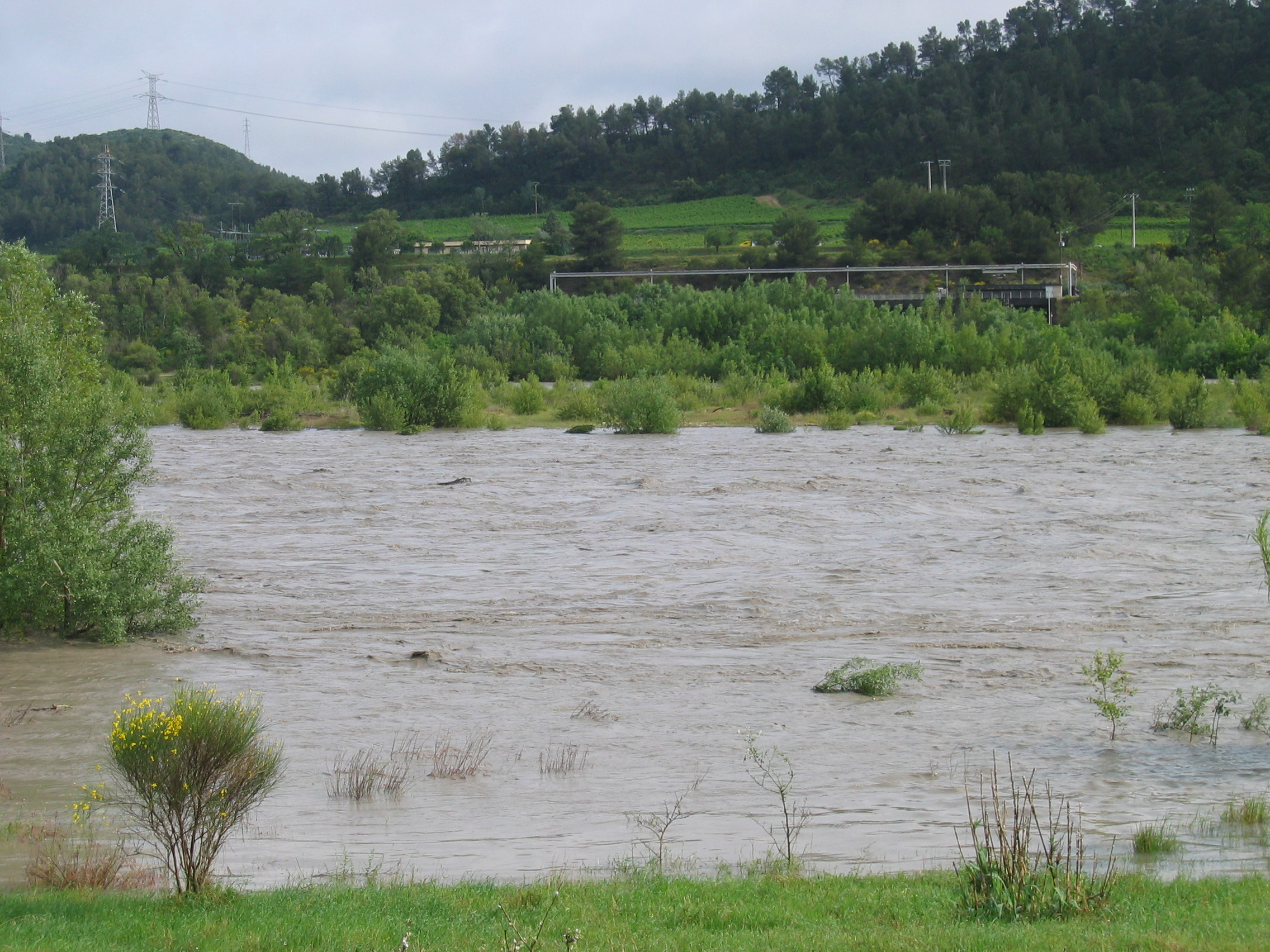
The Durance in flood

The sources of the water are a combination of melting snow and the drainage of rain from the surrounding hills and plateaux which have a Mediterranean climate. The latter's tributaries bring rain water mainly in spring, autumn and winter but little during the summer. At Serre-Ponçon, its basin of 3,600 square kilometres (1,400 mi^{2}) can create a flow as low as 18 cubic metres per second (640 cu ft/s) and a maximum flood of 1,700 cubic metres per second (60,000 cu ft/s) (value recorded in 1957).

At the confluence with the Rhône, the average natural flow of the Durance is approximately 190 cubic metres per second (6,700 cu ft/s), with a high annual variability. It can vary between 40 cubic metres per second (1,400 cu ft/s) (the most severe low water levels) and 6,000 cubic metres per second (210,000 cu ft/s) in catastrophic historic floods, levels reached in 1843, 1882 and 1886. At the outlet into the Lac de Serre-Ponçon, the medium flow is 81 cubic metres per second (2,900 cu ft/s); at Oraison it is 123 cubic metres per second (4,300 cu ft/s) and after the confluence with the Verdon, flow reaches 174 cubic metres per second (6,100 cu ft/s) (250 to 330 m^{3}/s in spring, 100 m^{3}/s in the summer). The contribution of water from the downstream tributaries is very low. The annual maximum flow generally occurs in May or June, but the most violent flash floods occur in autumn. The lowest water levels occur in winter in the upper valley, and in summer in the middle and lower part of the river.

=== Flash floods and low water levels ===
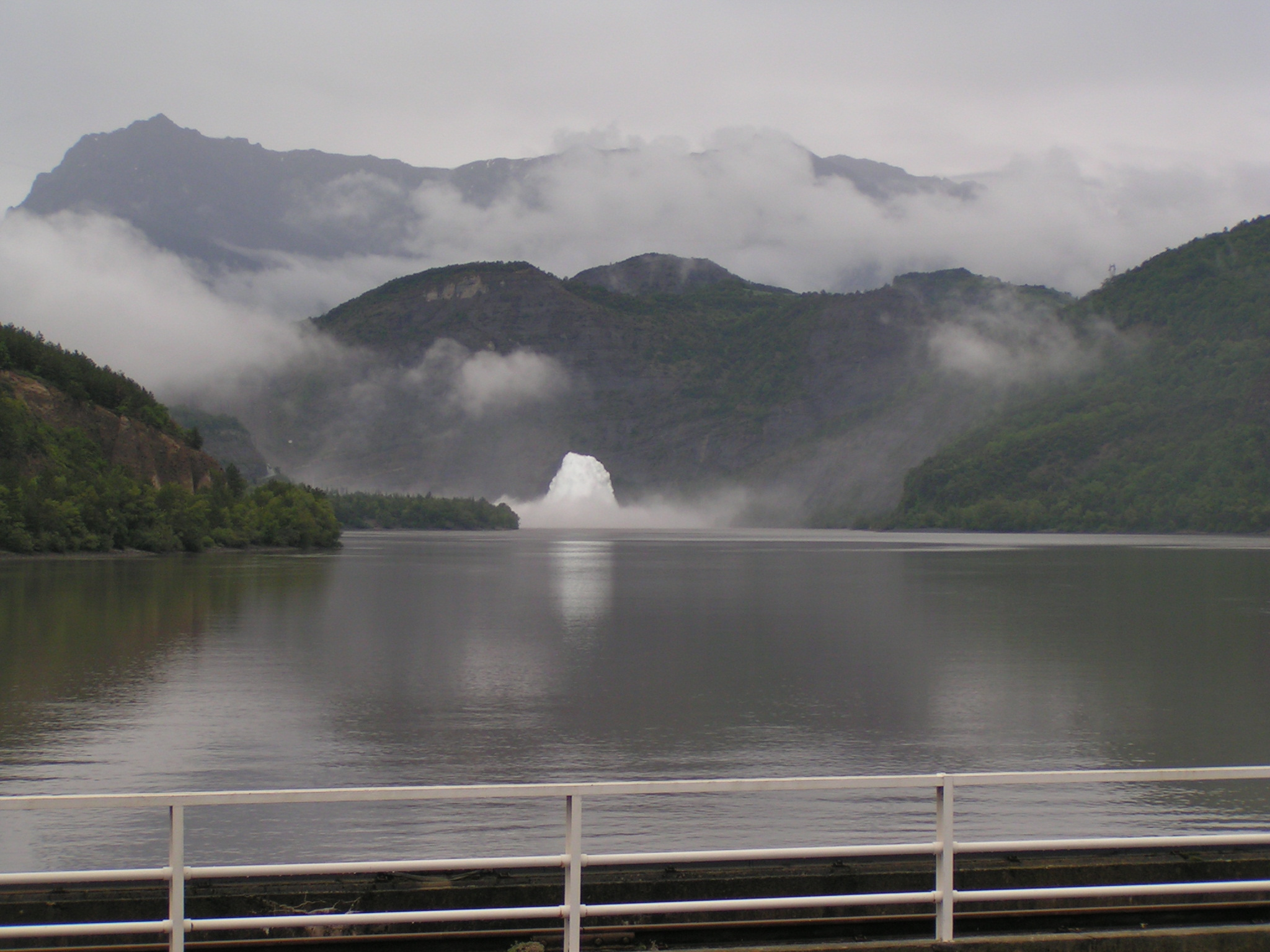
Plume of water rising at the dam of Serre-Ponçon seen from the bridge at Espinasse - May 30, 2008

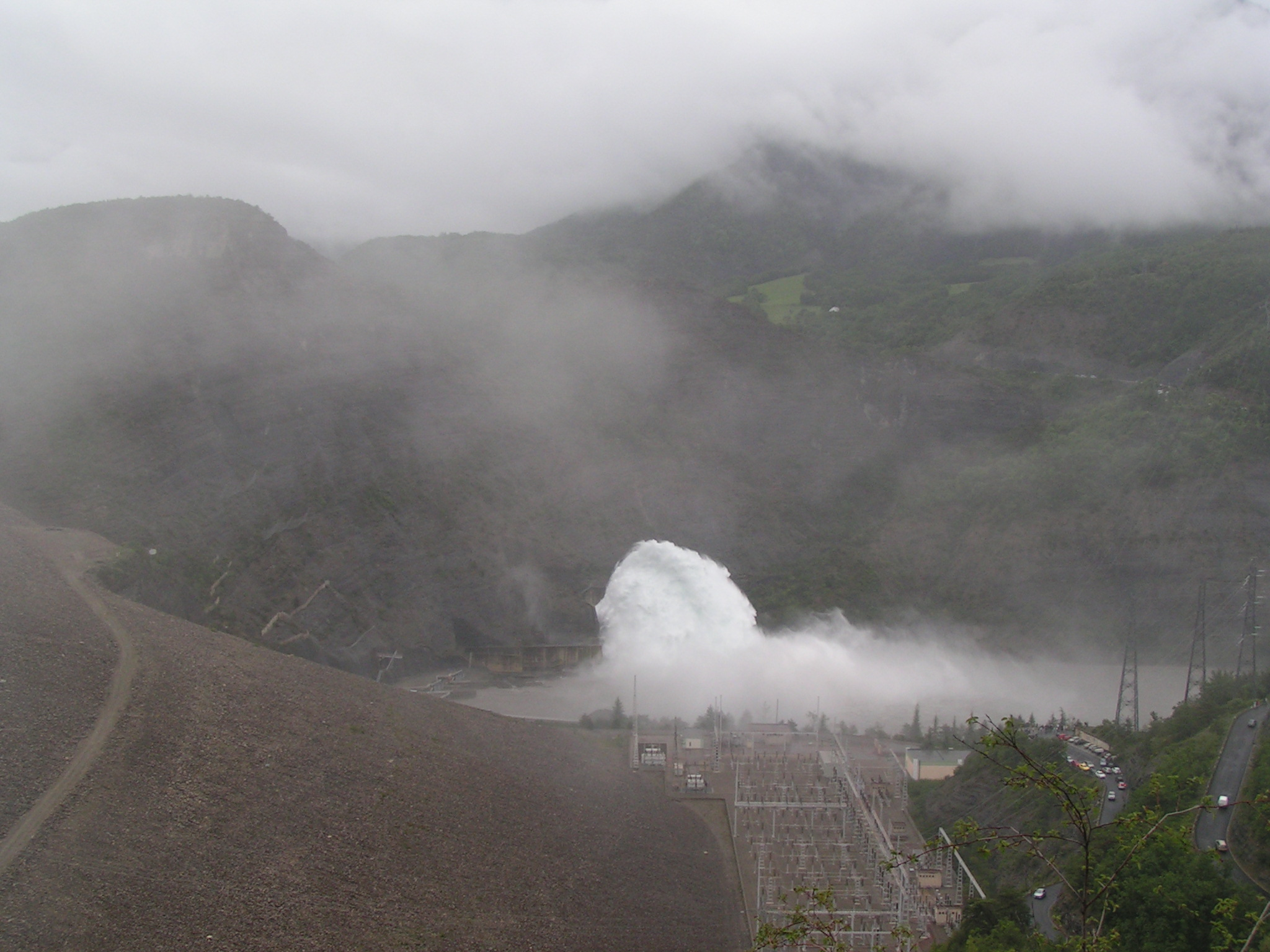
Spillway of Serre-Ponçon dam seen from Espinasse bridge - May 30, 2008

The river is famous historically for its unstable course and violent floods. In the 12th century the Durance had swept away the town of Rama (between Briançon and Embrun, with the confluence of Biaisse) .

These increased in number and force from the second half of the 16th century, though lessened in the 20th century. The period of increased flooding was not only due to the cooling starting from the 14th and until the 19th century (with increased rain and snowfall), but also because the major deforestation of the slopes of the mountains of the basin of the Durance, starting from the 16th century.

Between 1832 and 1890, the Durance had 188 floods of more than 3 metres (10 ft) (measured at the Mirabeau Bridge). The flood of 1843 carried away several newly built suspension bridges: the 1829 bridge at Remollon, the 1835 bridge at Mirabeau, the unfinished bridge at Manosque and the 1838 bridge at Les Mées. The flood of 1872 also swept away the 1847 bridge at Mallemort.

The catastrophic floods of 1843, 1856, 1886 attained 5,000 to 6,000 cubic metres per second (180,000 to 210,000 cu ft/s) For comparison, the Seine flooding of 1910 was estimated at 2,400 cubic metres per second (85,000 cu ft/s). Even lesser floods were devastating. The flood of 31 May and 1 June 1877 swept away the bridge of Tallard.

In the 20th century, the floods were less frequent and violent thanks to the dams and the re-afforestation in the Durance basin, but there were still serious floods in 1957 and 1994 with maxima measured at Mirabeau and at Sisteron of 2,800 cubic metres per second (99,000 cu ft/s); and this volume was increased at the confluence with the Verdon by a further 500 cubic metres per second (18,000 cu ft/s).

The height of the water at the gorge at Cadarache is at 472 millimetres (18.6 in), after an average of 750 millimetres (30 in) of rain because 63% of the rain flows into the Durance.

At Mirabeau, the lowest flow was 27 cubic metres per second (950 cu ft/s) (during the drought of 1921) i.e. a ratio of 1:133 between minimum and maximum.

=== Islands ===
Three types of islands are formed in the bed of the Durance:

- gravel banks, brought by the floods, and generally without or with little vegetation;
- sand and silt banks, which can be highly fertile for plants like willow. These are only ever swept away by exceptional floods;
- accumulations of tree trunks and branches.

== Principal bridges ==
Hautes-Alpes :

- Pont de Savines on Lac de Serre-Ponçon (on route nationale RN94) (length 924 metres).

Alpes-de-Haute-Provence :

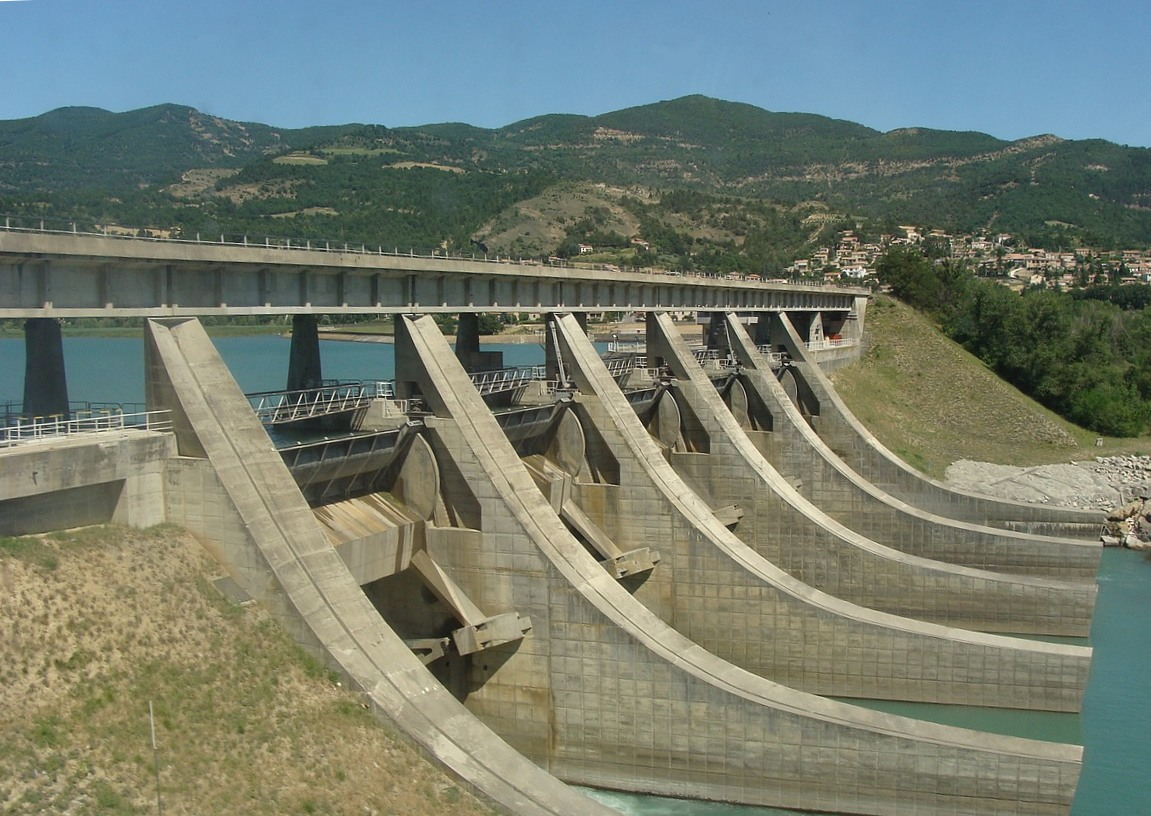
Le dam/bridge of l'Escale

- Old bridge to Baume at Sisteron
- Viaduct of the A51 autoroute south of Sisteron
- Dam/bridge at L'Escale (Route nationale RN 85). This replaced the Trébaste Bridge, 1962–3
- Railway viaduct on the line from Saint-Auban to Digne
- Steel girder bridge at Les Mées (road D4a)
- Pont de La Brillanne (road D4b)
- Aqueduct at Villeneuve (canal EDF).
- Pont de Manosque (road D907)

Between the Vaucluse and the Bouches-du-Rhône :

- Viaduct on the A51 autoroute between Beaumont-de-Pertuis and Cadarache
- Pont de Mirabeau (road ex-RN96)
- Suspension bridge at Pertuis
- Suspension bridge at Mallemort

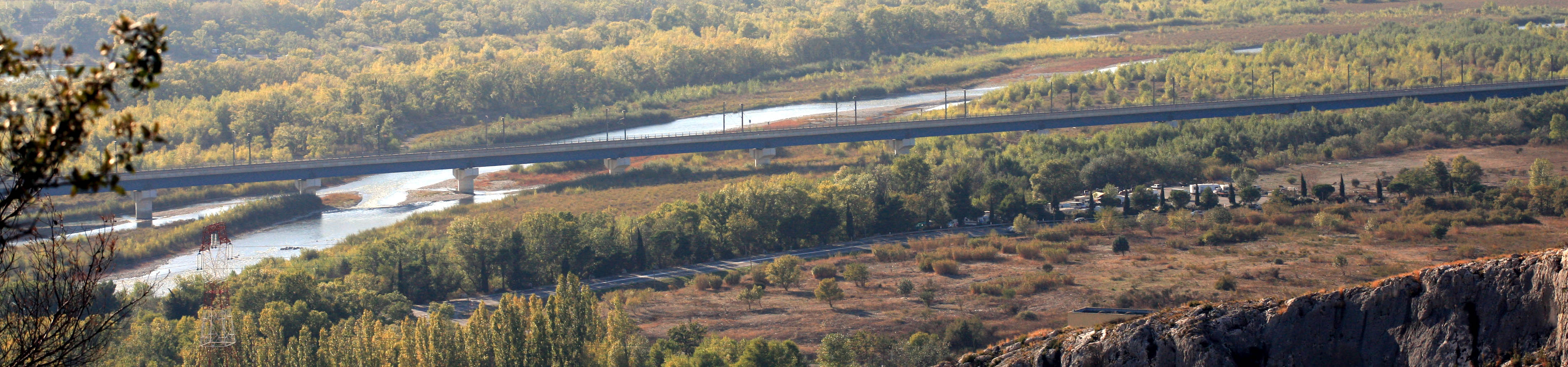
Viaduct at Cavaillon for LGV Méditerranée

- Three viaducts for LGV Méditerranée at Cavaillon (length - 940, 900 et 1500 metres)
- Twin viaducts for Route nationale RN7 and for the A7 autoroute at Bonpas
- Pont de Rognonas (road D970), suspension bridge to the south of Avignon
- Rail viaduct for the old Paris - Marseille line south of Avignon.

== Management of the course ==
=== Dams and canals ===
Dams have been built since the Middle Ages to prevent flooding. At first they were often boxes of wood filled up of stones, but these do not resist the floods for long. Dams have also long been used for irrigation. The first known irrigation canal is the Canal Saint-Julien, dug in 1171 by the Marquis de Forbin. It was followed by the Adam de Craponne canal, 50 kilometres (31 mi) long, dug in nine months in 1554 from Silvacane to Arles), the canal des Alpilles, the canal de Marseille, the canal de Carpentras, the canal de Manosque, the canal de Ventavon, and the hundreds of other smaller ones, totalling 540 kilometres (340 mi) dug between the end of the 16th century and the end of the 19th century.

=== Marseille Canal ===
From 1839 to 1854, the engineer Franz Mayor de Montricher built a canal to supply the city of Marseille with drinking water. It is 80 kilometres (50 mi) long with 17 kilometres (11 mi) underground. The canal is made out of concrete, and the aqueducts out of stone or stone and brick. The volume of water flowing through the canal is 10 cubic metres per second (350 cu ft/s) with the slope of 0.36 metres per kilometre (1.9 ft/mi). The width across the surface of the canal is 9.4 metres (31 ft), and 3 metres (9.8 ft) at its base.

The water was first abstracted near the bridge of Pertuis, at an elevation of 185 metres (607 ft), 50 kilometres (31 mi) from Marseilles. From there the canal diverges to the west from the Durance to Le Puy-Sainte-Réparade. Following the construction of the large EDF canal, which follows the Durance from Serre-Ponçon until Salon-de-Provence and the Étang de Berre, the water for the canal of Marseilles is now taken from the EDF canal, below Saint-Estève-Janson. From there to Marseille the canal follows an 80-kilometre (50 mi) path, of which 17 kilometres (11 mi) is underground. The Durance provides today two-thirds of the water for the city of Marseilles.

=== Hydroelectric installation ===
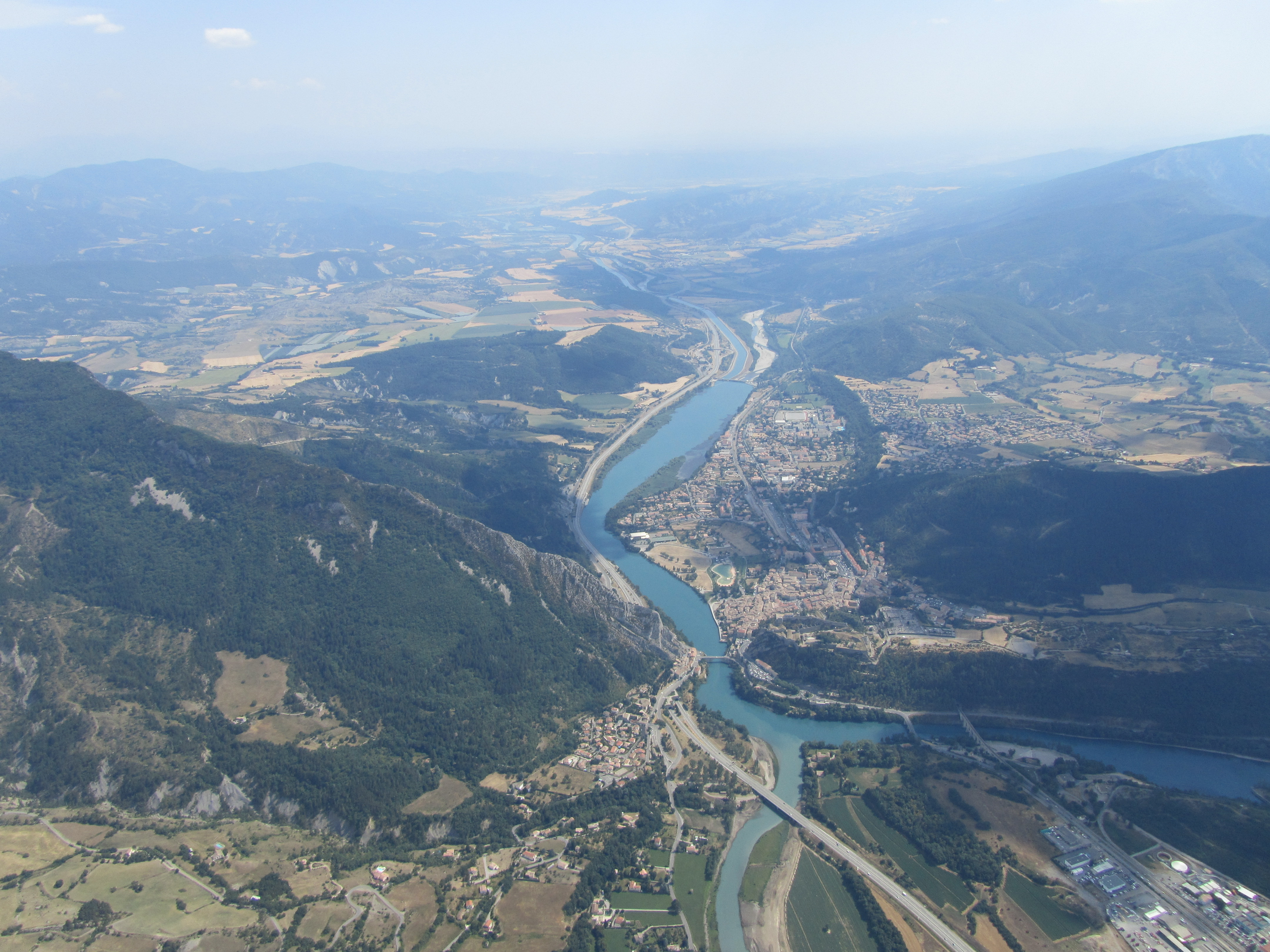
Sisteron from the air showing dam to the south of the town, and confluence with Buech from the right

In 1955, the law defined the EDF Durance-Verdon project had three objectives:

- production of electricity;
- irrigation and the supply of water to towns;
- minimisation of the flooding.

Over 40 years, this project required the construction of 23 dams and water extraction points starting upstream of Claux sur Argentiere down to Mallemort and the supply of 33 hydroelectric power stations and several control stations.

This programme was an almost complete success:

- the Durance-Verdon project produces 6 to 7 billion kWh per annum (10% of the French hydroelectric production);
- the reservoirs provide drinking water to the whole area, and irrigate all of Provence (a third of all French irrigation);
- the lakes are a tourist attraction (Serre-Ponçon attracts 10% of the tourists visiting Hautes-Alpes);
- although routine floods are prevented, the project cannot have any effect on major floods, as shown by the flood of 1994, which reached 3,000 cubic metres per second (110,000 cu ft/s) in Cadarache. Indeed, the lake at Serre-Ponçon only controls the upper reaches of the Durance, and does not control the lower tributaries, whose role is important in the creation of the major floods. All the other dams are only to abstract water. Only the flow of the Verdon is controlled by a dam, Lac de Sainte-Croix, and only if there is enough storage capacity at the time of the flood.

==== Impact of the works ====
The Durance used to have an average natural flow of 188 cubic metres per second (6,600 cu ft/s) and behaved like a Mediterranean river, but dams and canals have changed it considerably. When the flow is low, most of the water in the river now flows in "industrial channels" which by-pass the natural course of the river to run through hydro-electric power stations. These channels can take up to 250 cubic metres per second (8,800 cu ft/s), so that it is only at the time of high flows that the water not diverted uses the river's natural channel.

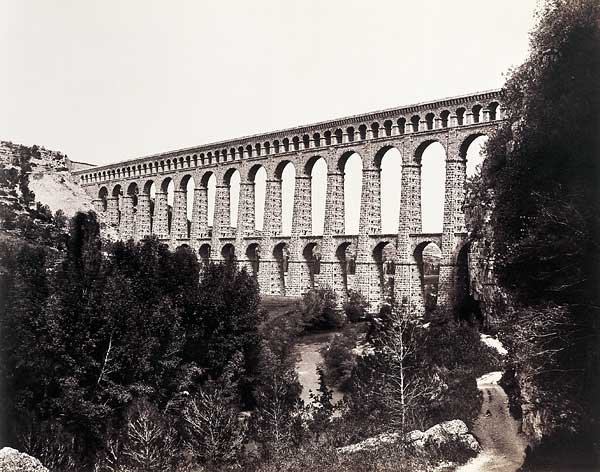
Roquefavour Aqueduct

== Ecology ==
Along the river there are many habitats of both regional and European importance that are naturally governed by the varying flow of the river. These habitats include both mountain and Mediterranean types. The river with its valley is an important biological corridor, within the national green infrastructure and the Pan-European ecological network. Consequently, it is classified as a Natura 2000 protected area.

Currently there are between 150 and 200 species of benthic macroinvertebrates, but with few plant species (due to the greatly changing flow of the river).

Water quality is considered good in the higher valley, in spite of the number of dams, which deprive the Durance of the power needed to carry sediment away. This quality was obtained thanks to actions of clean-up projects on the river itself and on the tributaries of the Luye and Calavon (also called le Coulon)). There remain some black spots in the valley (downstream from the Arkema factory at Château-Arnoux, below the confluence with the Calavon.

The 320 millimetres (13 in) depth variation results in significant temperature variations, from 0 to 28 °C (32 to 82 °F) seasonally; daily temperatures have 7.5 °C (45.5 °F) of amplitude in the summer and 10 °C (50 °F) in the winter. These are a significant factor in the biodiversity of the river. The dams in the valley have reduced the incidence of floods and so have allowed the colonisation of alluvial space by alder and poplar in riparian forests. The banks, although less wet, still accommodate 110 species of birds during the year, plus 82 species of migratory birds, which rest, feed and sometime reproduce. One-hundred-ten species of animal hibernate there. Avian diversity increased after the dams were built, but there was probably once a greater diversity. For some families of birds the number of individuals also increased.

There are approximately 75 species of mammals in the Durance catchment area, including: Eurasian beaver, southwestern water vole, Eurasian water shrew, many species of bat (barbastelle (Barbastella barbastellus, large murine (Myotis myotis), large rhinolophe (Rhinolophus ferrumequinum), minioptère of Schreibers (Miniopterus schreibersi), small murine (Myotis blythii), small rhinolophe (Rhinolophus hipposideros), vespertilion with indented ears (Myotis emarginatus), and vespertilion of Capaccini (Myotis capaccinii)). invasive are becoming more problematic including coypu and the recently arrived muskrat. Otters have recently become extinct in the entire catchment area.

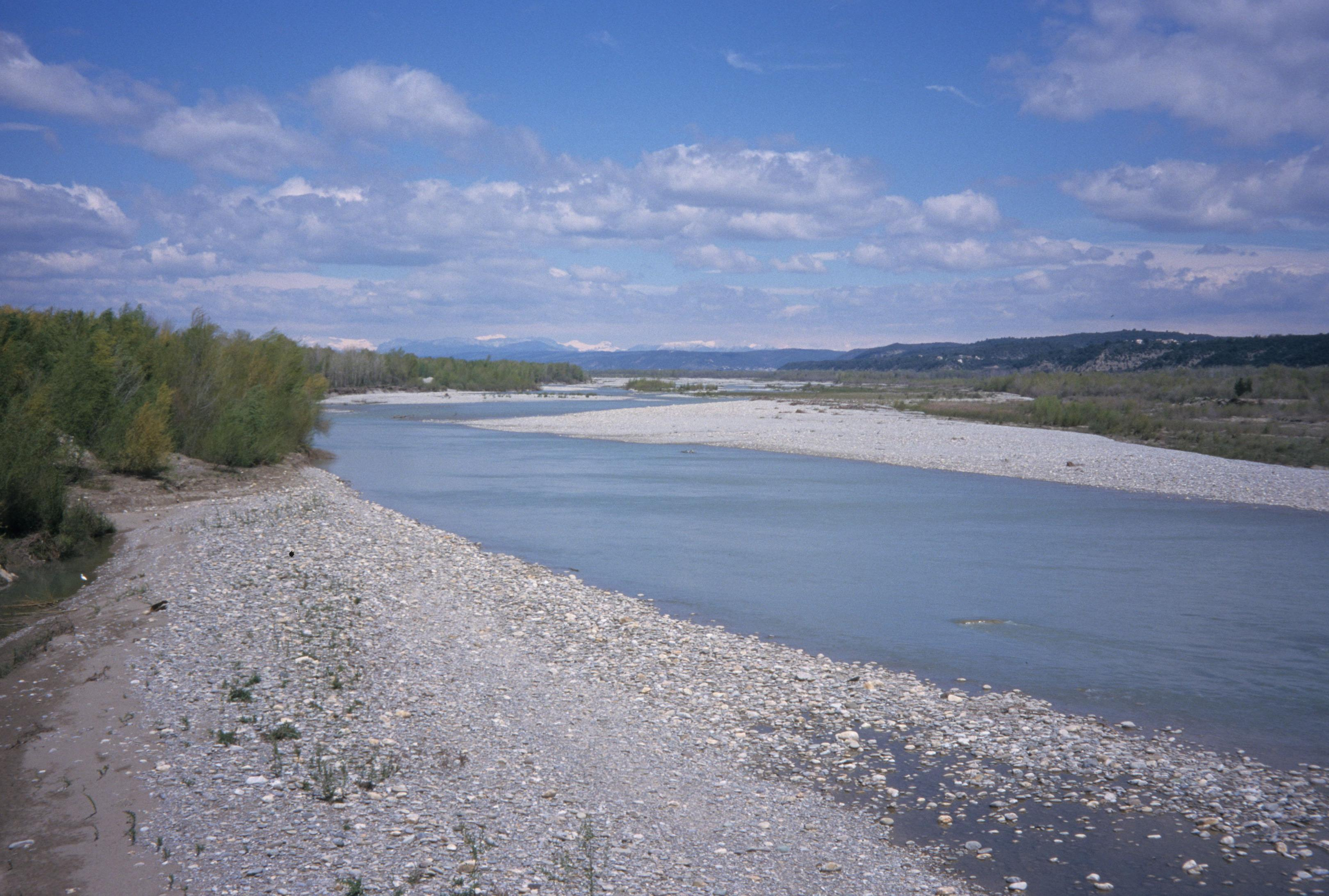
The Durance close to Manosque

The populations of algae and water plants (100 species on average) and water invertebrates (77 species) are more varied than before the dams compared with populations on the similar Asse and Buëch. Ludwigia, the primrose willow, is an invasive plant having gradually spread since 1986 in the stagnant water in dead gravel pits and ponds.

There are only fourteen fish species, including some native species: souffia, south-west European nase and large populations of Zingel asper and spined loach which are both endangered species of fish. But the silting and the lack of oxygen has greatly reduced the number of trout. The European brook lamprey has been seen in recent times but it may have disappeared since.

== History ==
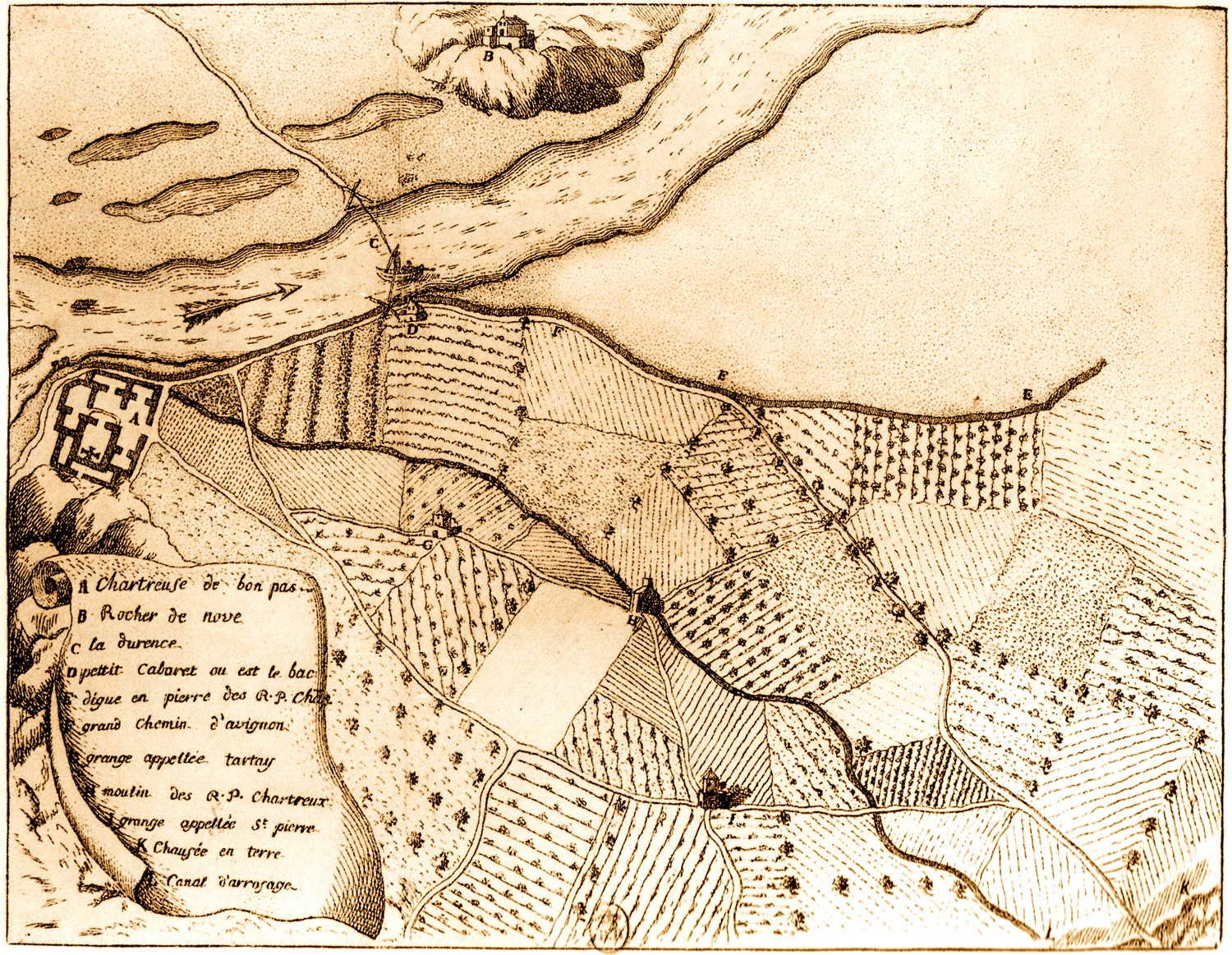
A section of the river between Noves and Chartreuse de Bonpas

The Durance played a very important part in the history of Provence, and largely contributed to the economic growth and population of the Marseilles area, after having been an obstacle for centuries. From Antiquity until the 19th century, the Durance was famous for the difficulty of crossing it, its massive floods and an inconstant flow. The width of its bed, the force and depth of its current, and the changes of course after the floods hindered crossing by ford. The only durable fords are those of Mirabeau and Pertuis, obviously unusable in periods of floods. The changes in the flow also limited river navigation (in spite of size of the river in periods with a high flow. It sometimes needed several ferries to cross the various arms or channels. The unstable and sometimes steep banks prevented easy access to ferries. In more recent times even suspension bridges often had to be re-built after floods.

=== Prehistory ===
Twelve million years ago, the Durance flowed directly into the Mediterranean. During the Riss glaciation, the source of the Durance was at Sisteron, where the icecap finished. As the ice-cap receded, the Durance course changed towards the west, between Luberon and Alpilles, and flowed into the Rhône.

=== Antiquity ===
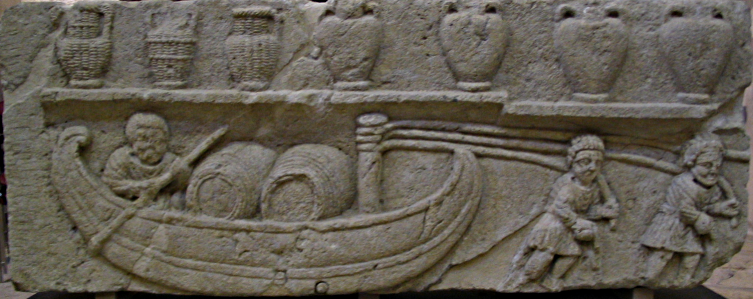
Bas-relief Gallo-Roman time: trade of wine on the Durance (Cabrières-d'Aigues, Vaucluse)

In pre-Roman times, the Durance was the border between various Celto-Ligurian people established along its course, such as the Cavares (Cavaillon) and the Salyes (Bouches-du-Rhône).

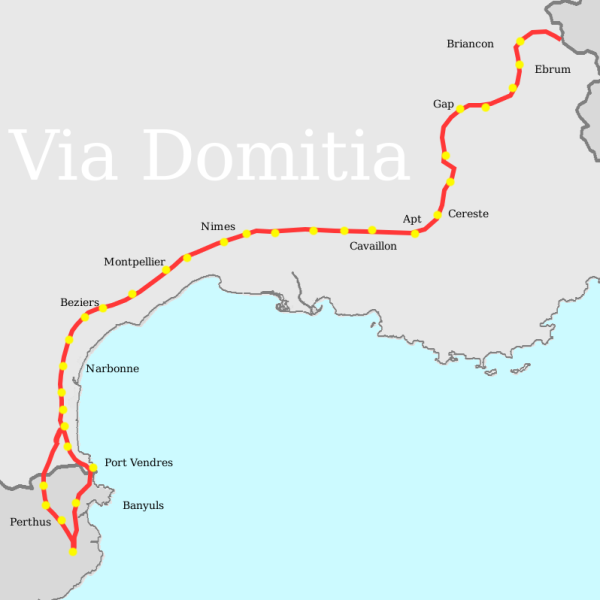
The Via Domitia crossing the Durance at Cavaillon

The valley of the Durance is a route through the Alps, used by the Via Domitia. A statue of Janus was erected at Montgenèvre, the only passage between Cisalpine Gaul and Gallia NarbonensisStrabon (1st century) reported that a ferry was established in Cavaillon, The great Roman way from Spain to Italy only crossed the Durance at Cavaillon and Sisteron. The existence of a bridge at Sisteron was recorded. At other places there were ferries, in particular at Pertuis, whose name is based on it ferry. Although it was difficult to cross, except in Sisteron, the Durance was nevertheless navigable. The bas-reliefs at Cabrières-d'Aigues depict the river being used for the transport of various liquid food products such as wine and olive oil. Gallo-Romans used the towpaths (helciarii) and the wind to move upstream. Several specialized businesses maintained this system transport. Workers known as nautes had a monopoly of transport on large rivers and used boats, whereas the utricularii operated on the small rivers and in the marshes using rafts floating on inflated goatskins. There were two groups of utriculari, one in Sisteron and one in Riez.

This trade fed the activity of an important port, near to the crossroads at Sisteron, at the place called 'Le Bourguet'. In the vicinity of L'Escale a port existed before the Roman conquest, but was developed during the 1st century BC, and was prosperous until the Crisis of the 3rd Century, before recovering its economic activity until the beginning of the 5th century.

=== Middle Ages ===
In the Middle Ages, the county of Forcalquier stretched all along the Durance, from Cavaillon to La Roche-de-Rame, close to Embrun. From the 12th to the 19th century, the river was used for floating timber downstream, in particular by the monks of Boscodon Abbey, who were given the privilege in 1191 to use the river.) The timber was used in the towns of the southern plains and in the shipyards.

Other goods were transported by the river, including salt, those these were subject to ten tolls along the 300 kilometres (190 mi) of the river.

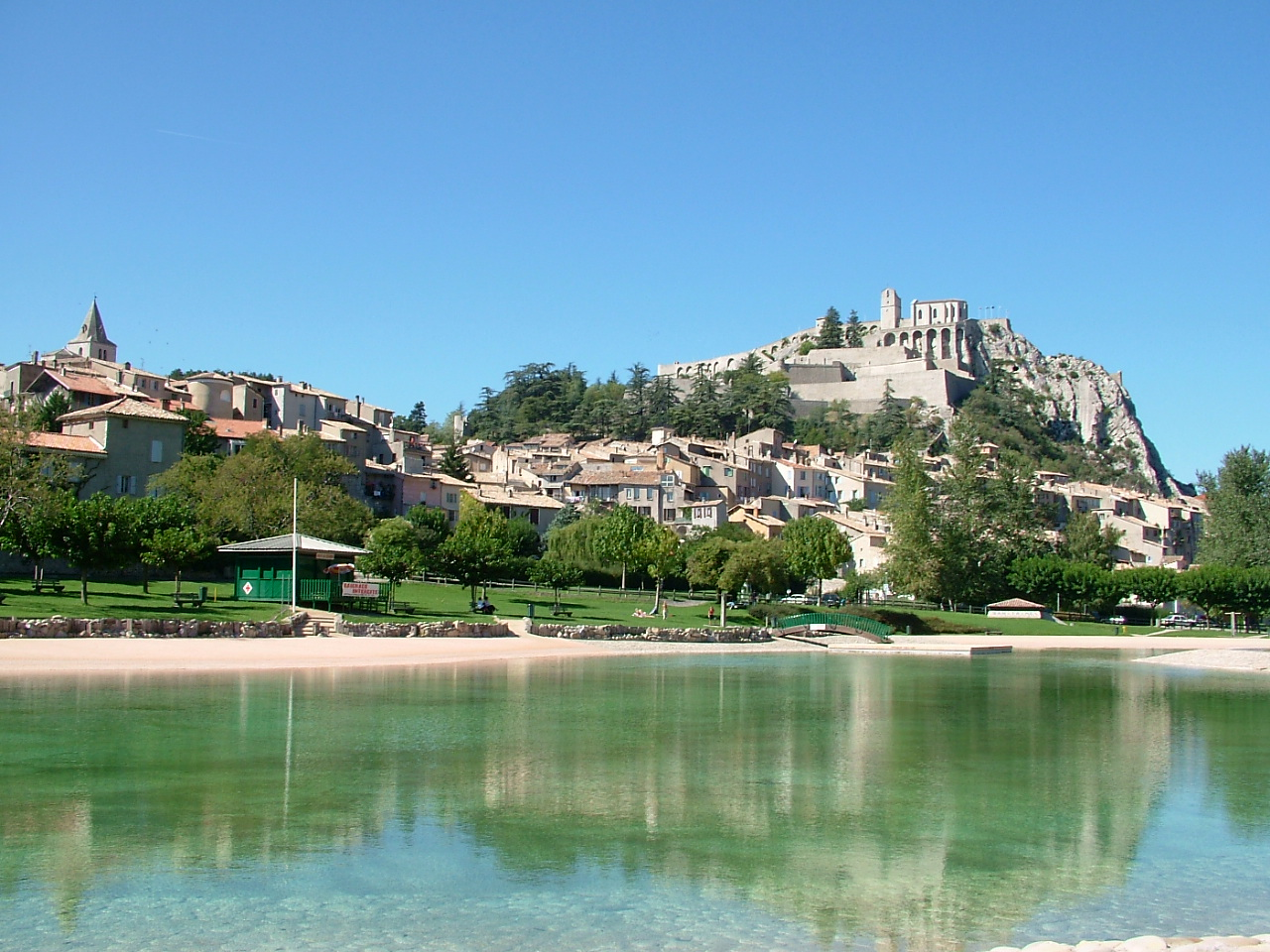
Sisteron built on banks of the Durance

The bridge of Sisteron, erected in the Middle Ages remained until the middle of the 19th century, the only crossing between two firm banks along the Durance. After the year 1000, the number of ferries increased, including some Cable ferries plied between the two banks of the main channel. The oldest known one was the one between La Roque-d'Anthéron and Cadenet (in Gontard), recorded in 1037. This ferry at Cadenet and one at Mirabeau were used to transport flocks of sheep for seasonal migrations. Thereafter, there is evidence of ferries at many other places notably Rognonas, La Brillanne (13th century), Noves, Orgon, Le Puy-Sainte-Réparade, Meyrargues, Pertuis, Peyrolles, that of Cante-Perdrix in Mirabeau, Manosque, Giropey, Château-Arnoux, Le Bourguet, Volonne, Bompas. Other ferries were established to supply the windmills built at the end of the 18th century in Poët, Upaix and Claret. Nevertheless, the ferry services were scarcer than on the Rhône with a ferry every 9 to 11 kilometres (5.6 to 6.8 mi) on average, versus every 5.2 kilometres (3.2 mi) on the Rhône. Starting from the 12th century, wood bridges were also built. They lasted varying times until they were destroyed in various ways:

- at Maupas (now Pont de Bonpas at Caumont), at the end of the 12th century until its destruction by the Count of Toulouse in 1241;
- at Mirabeau, the beginning of the 13th century, close to Sainte-Madeleine-du-Pont;
- at Savines, the most used bridge on the Upper Durance (built in the 15th century)
- the ancient bridge of Sisteron which was rebuilt in 1365.

=== 19th century ===
In 1843, 1856, 1882 and 1886 there were catastrophic floods. The 1852 floods affected the entire basin of the Durance, from Sisteron to its confluence in Avignon. It washed away many cultivated alluvial terraces, broke dams and destroyed canals.

The irrigation syndicates and the local services that maintained the roads and bridges requested exceptional help from the State. A service to monitor the river was created, the Service spécial de la Durance, in order to study the hydrology of the river, using the kilometre-long divisions from 1868 between the confluence with the Verdon with that with the Rhône. This division allows surveying and mapping of the land at risk.

The construction of the Marseille canal in the middle of the 19th century allowed the metropolitan area of Marseille to develop quickly.

=== 20th century ===
The Durance was ceased to carry freight because of competition from road and rail. There were only 10 raftmen remaining in 1896 and only one in 1908.

Hydroelectric installations and chains of locks on the Durance, and its tributaries the Verdon, Buëch and Bléone had the most significant economic impacts and are the most visible change in the landscape. The major part of the flow was diverted into canals downstream from Serre-Ponçon, and the flow in the river's natural bed is a minimal flow of 2 to 5 cubic metres per second (71 to 177 cu ft/s), which is only 1/40 of its natural flow. The silt in the river bed has become stabilised by vegetation and this also reduces the flow. Thanks to the reservoirs at Serre-Ponçon and Sainte-Croix, which together can hold more than 2 billion tonnes of water, irrigation remains possible in summer even during the driest years. The predictable water levels have also allowed development of the local economy through summer tourism.

Beginning in the 1950s, aggregate was extracted from the river bed for road surfacing and wear-resistant concrete. The majority of the quarries have closed or are closing. The few factories that used the river's energy have closed (an aluminium factory at L'Argentière-la-Bessée) or are being closed (Arkema at Saint-Auban).

At Cadarache an experimental nuclear fusion reactor, ITER, is under construction.

4/67 Durance Helicopter Squadron created in 1976, is charged with protecting the air force base at Apt-Saint-Christol and the nuclear missile site at Plateau d'Albion.

== In the arts ==
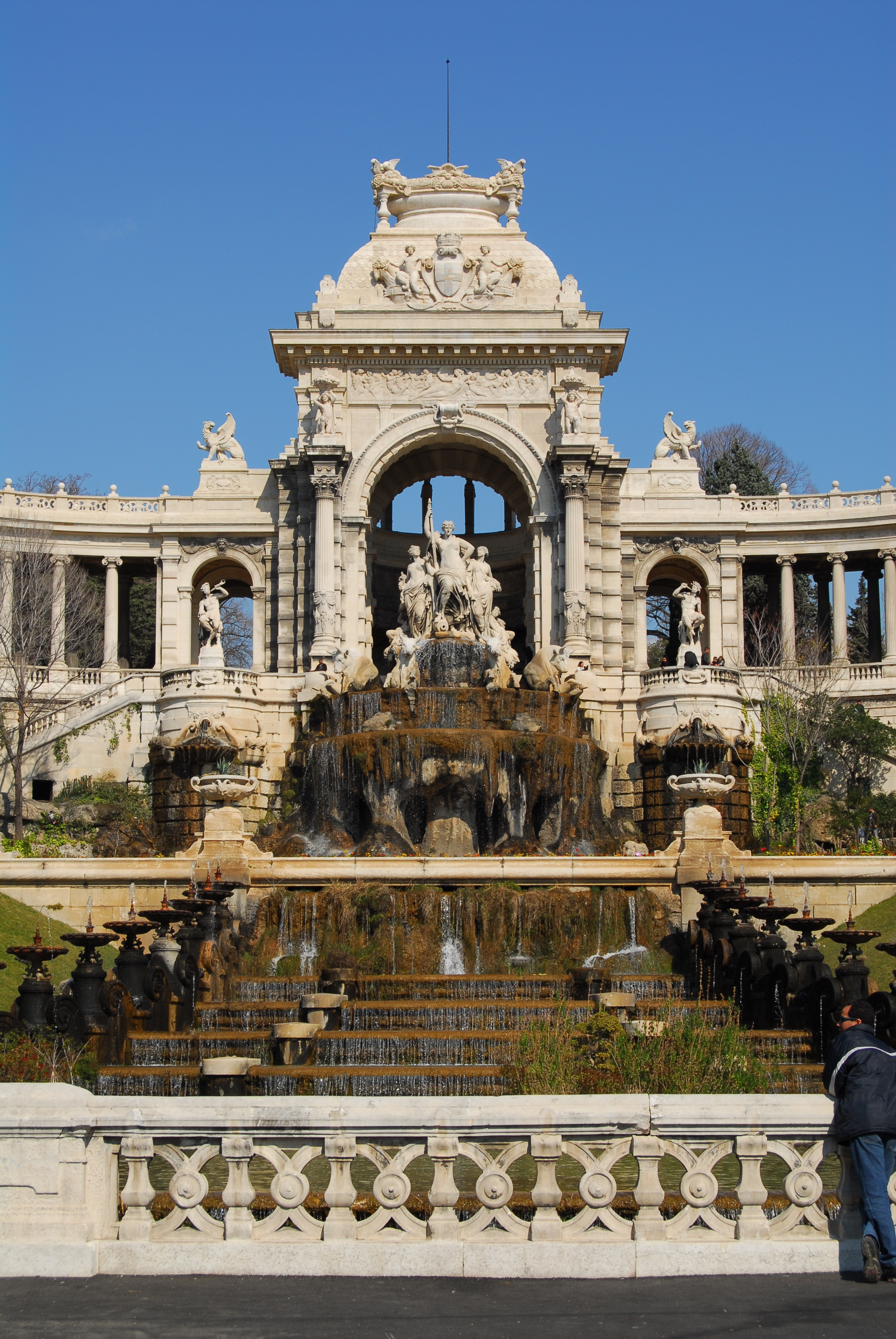
The Palais Longchamp

The Durance is represented in the form of an ornate monument at the Palais Longchamp, in Marseille, built between 1862 and 1869 by the architect Espérandieu, to celebrate the arrival of water from the Durance, via the Canal de Marseille. It is also depicted beneath a sculpture of a pregnant woman in Charleval, Bouches-du-Rhône.

References in literature include:

- Alexandre Dumas refers to the Durance as one of the three scourges of Provence
- poets Adolphe Dumas (1806–1861), Félibrige, republican and traditionalist, Paul Arène, Clovis Hugues and Élémir Bourges who referred to this river;
- the best known writer to be inspired by the Durance, Jean Giono, who makes use of it in his imaginary geography of Provence, transforming it into river that flows to the sea and he refers to it as masculine, and describing its flow through the water gap at Sisteron without mentioning the town, then describing an imaginary Rebeillard highland. Horseman on the Roof is also set along the course of the Durance.

Among the painters to have represented it are Guigou and Monticelli, close friends, who settled in Saint-Paul-lès-Durance and made many paintings where it appears, either as background, or as subject (86 of the 421 paintings by Guigou). The Romanian surrealist painter, Victor Brauner, took refuge in 1942 in Remollon and made several paintings on materials that he found.

For several years a club has revived the tradition of rafting, each year building rafts from tree trunks then navigating a section of the Durance with them.

An FM local radio station is called Radio Durance.

In French cinema is the setting of the film L'Eau vive by François Villiers is during the construction of the dam at Serre-Ponçon.

La Durance is also the name of an academic bulletin by history and geography professors at Aix-Marseille.

== Other ==
The Durance-class tanker is a series of multi-product replenishment oilers, originally designed and built for service in the French Navy.

== Notes and references ==
=== Bibliography ===
- Direction of the environment, of sustainable development and agriculture, The Durance: bond of life of the territory régional, District council PACA, 106 pp.
- Claude Gouron, photographer, Helene Vesian, author of the texts, Pierre Magnan, preface writer, The Durance: photographic voyage from the Alps in Provence, Avignon: Alain Barthélemy, 2002.
- Henri Julien, and Jean-Marie Gibelin, You, Durance, Barred, ED. Terradou, 1991, ISBN 978-2-907389-36-5.
- Coolidge, William Augustus Brevoort (1911). "Durance" . Encyclopædia Britannica. Vol. 8 (11th ed.). pp. 692–693.
- Cecile Miramont, Denis Furestier, Guy Barruol, Catherine Lonchambon, The Durance length into broad: ferries, boats and rafts in the history a carpricious river, Forcalquier: the Alps of light, 2005, Collection: The Alps of light, ISSN 0182-4643, num. 149,120 p, ISBN 978-2-906162-71-6.
- Nègre, Ernest (1990). Toponymie générale de la France. Librairie Droz. ISBN 978-2-600-02883-7.
- Jean-Paul Clébert and Jean-Pierre Rouyer, "La Durance", Privat, Toulouse, 1991, in the collection Rivers and valleys of France, ISBN 2-7089-9503-0.

=== Video ===
- Jacques Sapiega, The Durance, course & regard, District council PACA, 2004
