= Bridge-Building Brotherhood =

12th century religious association

The Bridge-Building Brotherhood (Latin: Fratres Pontifices; French: Frères Pontifes) is said to have been a religious association active during the 12th and 13th centuries and whose purpose was building bridges. The "Frères Pontifes" are a legend without any historical background.

== Legend ==
Building bridges greatly helped travelers and in particular pilgrims. It was customary for a bishop to grant indulgences to those who, by money or labor, contributed to the construction of a bridge, even when no brotherhood or religious organization was involved. The register of the Archbishop of York, Walter de Gray, shows examples of indulgences granted in the 13th century for the building of bridges.

The brotherhood Fratres Pontifices ("Bridgebuilding Brotherhood" in English), or Frères Pontifes, is said to have been founded in the latter part of the 12th century by St. Bénézet (a Provençal variant of the name Benedict). Bénézet was a youth who, according to legend, was divinely inspired to build the Pont Saint-Bénézet across the Rhône at Avignon. The old bridge at Avignon, some arches of which still remain, dates from the end of the 12th century. Up to the present day, St. Bénézet is venerated in Avignon as the builder of the bridge and founder of the Frères Pontifes. The Fratres Pontifices are believed to have been very active, and to have built other bridges at Pont de Bonpas, Lourmarin, Mallemort and Mirabeau. They also are said to have maintained hospices at the chief fords of the principal rivers, besides building bridges and looking after ferries. The bridge over the Rhône at Pont-Saint-Esprit has been attributed to the Frères Pontifes, too.

The Brotherhood is supposed to have consisted of three branches-- knights, clergy and artisans, where the knights usually had contributed most of the funds and were sometimes called donati, the clergy were usually monks who represented the church, and the artisans were the workers who actually built the bridges. Sisters are sometimes mentioned as belonging to the same association. In addition to the construction of bridges, the brotherhood allegedly often attended to the lodging and entertainment of travelers and the collection of alms or quête.

There are conflicting reports regarding the recognizance of the Fratres Pontifices by Pope Clement III. One source states that the brotherhood was recognized by Clement III in 1189, and other sources report that Clement III addressed a Papal Bull to the Fratres Pontifices in 1191, but the authenticity of that Papal Bull is questioned.

== History ==
Historical research, however, led to the conclusion that no brotherhood of the kind described by the legend ever existed. There are no historical sources relating to the existence of any such order and there is no evidence of any of the numerous bridges allegedly built by the Order.

It is inconceivable that a youth accompanied by some followers without any construction experience should have built a 900 m-long (3,000 ft) stone arch bridge in an era when all experience and tradition of building large bridges had been lost and when all skilled trades were strictly controlled by the respective craft guilds.

In that era, when neither banks nor banknotes nor demand deposits existed, the financial means for such a large project could be put up only by collecting coins or later on, indulgences. This kind of financing required the sustained initiative of persons interested in the project, typically the heads of the local trading houses, who got together in a confrèrie (corresponding to a present-day syndicate or citizens' initiative) in order to collect the funds over the prolonged period of time required for the execution of the project. Such a confrèrie had nothing to do with a religious order or even less with a monastery, save that often monasteries were asked to audit the use of the funds since they were one of the very few institutions capable of rendering such services. The construction works were executed by professional builders not related to any religious order.

The title "Pontifex Avenione / Pontife d'Avigon" (bridge builder of Avignon) appears not to have been mentioned prior to 1665. The legend was developed into a vivid history by François-René de Chateaubriand (1768–1848) and also by Eugène Viollet-le-Duc (1814–1879). During the Romantic era, other writers have had the brotherhood executing bridges throughout Europe and even in countries as far away as Britain and Sweden (although there was never any historical report of such extensive activities).

They did however, display the ability in making it into well known reference works such as the Encyclopædia Britannica or the German Brockhaus Enzyklopädie
