= Pont de Bonpas =

Bridge between Vaucluse and Bouches-du-Rhône, France

Coordinates: 43°53′17″N 4°55′00″E

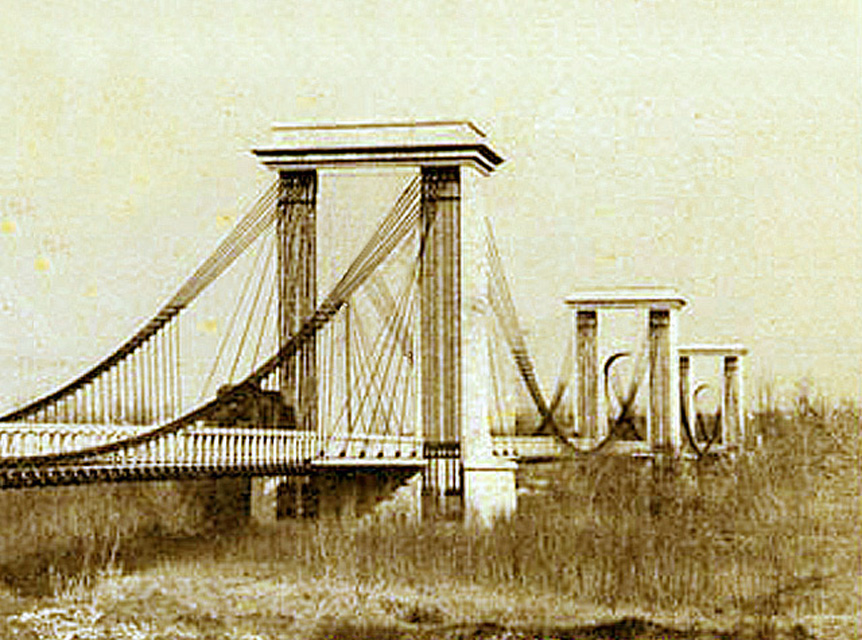
A postcard of the suspension bridge constructed in 1894.

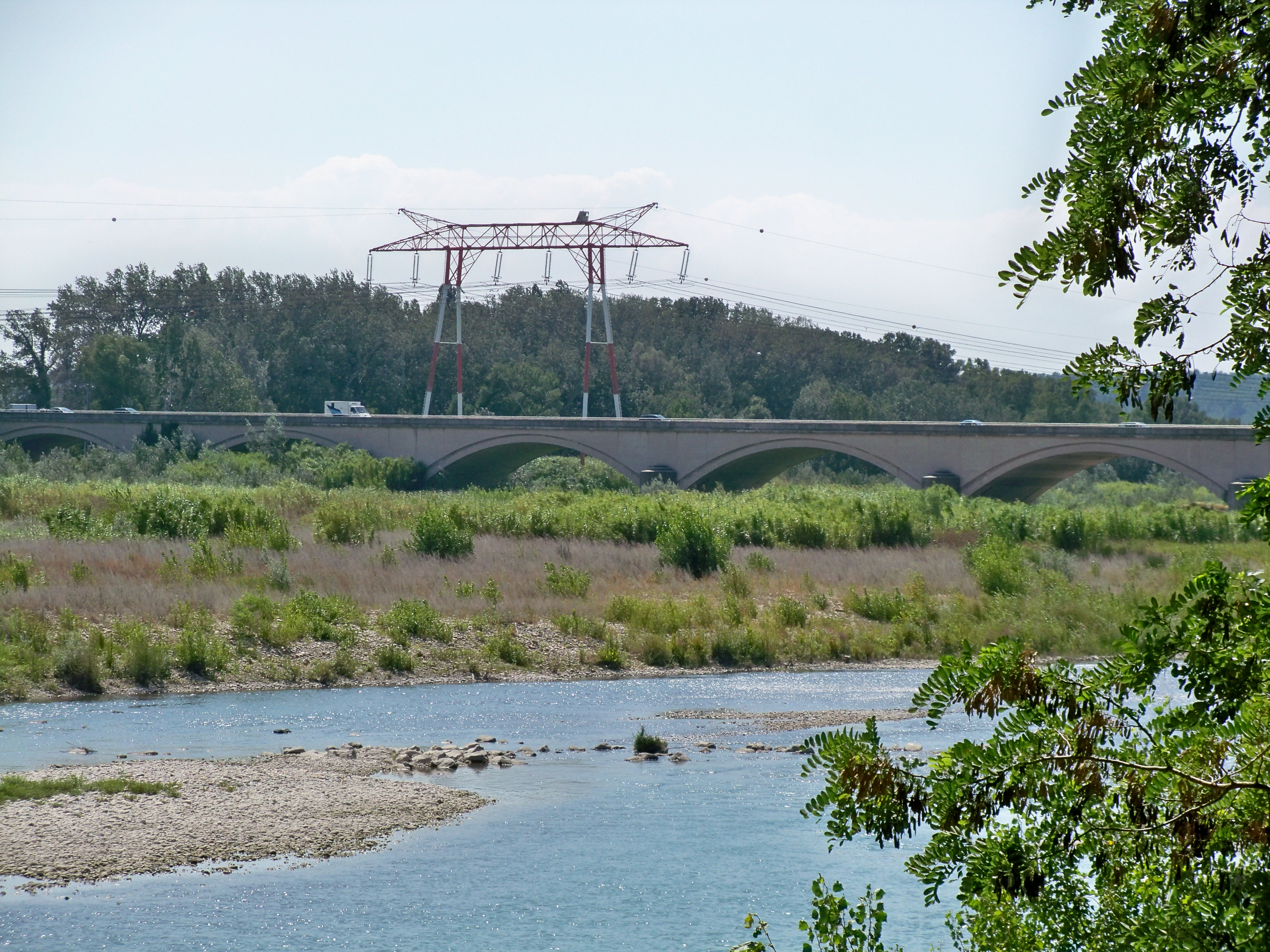
Pont de Bonpas in 2011.

The Pont de Bonpas is a bridge over the Durance river, connecting the south of Vaucluse to the north of Bouches-du-Rhône in southern France. An initial stone bridge was constructed between 1189 and 1199 and destroyed by a 1272 flood. Reconstruction was attempted in 1316 but ultimately failed. A new bridge was not completed until 1812. This was later damaged by a flood, and a suspension bridge opened in 1894, but was destroyed in 1944. The current bridge was constructed in 1954 and is 500 metres (1,600 ft) long with twelve arches.

== History ==
Prior to the construction of a bridge to cross the Durance river, there is evidence that a reaction ferry was used from 1166. A religious organisation, the Bridge-Building Brotherhood, was involved in bridge construction, road repairs, and a variety of other tasks. It began constructing a bridge while providing housing for foreigners beside the Durance River and later completed a stone bridge. It was constructed between 1189 and 1199. In 1270, Alphonse, Count of Poitiers, granted the Bridge-Building Brotherhood the rights over the bridge over the Durance and confirmed the fiefs, rights and jurisdictions it had in the counties of Venaissin and Toulouse. It was destroyed by a flood in 1272.

In 1316, the construction of a new bridge using stones from the old bridge was authorized but failed in 1320. In 1804, plans to construct a new wooden bridge were made, and a 548-metre-long (1,798 ft) bridge with 47 spans opened in 1812. Nine spans were damaged in an 1886 flood, and it became a footbridge. A new suspension bridge opened in 1894 with a length of 520 metres (1,710 ft). In 1944, the bridge was bombed by the 1st FG on 17 August with five near misses and no damage to the structure. During the Nazi German retreat from France, Hitler's forces destroyed the suspension bridge. In 1954, a new bridge was completed to allow river crossings, consisting of 12 arches supporting the 500-metre-long (1,600 ft) structure.
