= Mirabeau, Vaucluse =

Mirabeau
- Commune
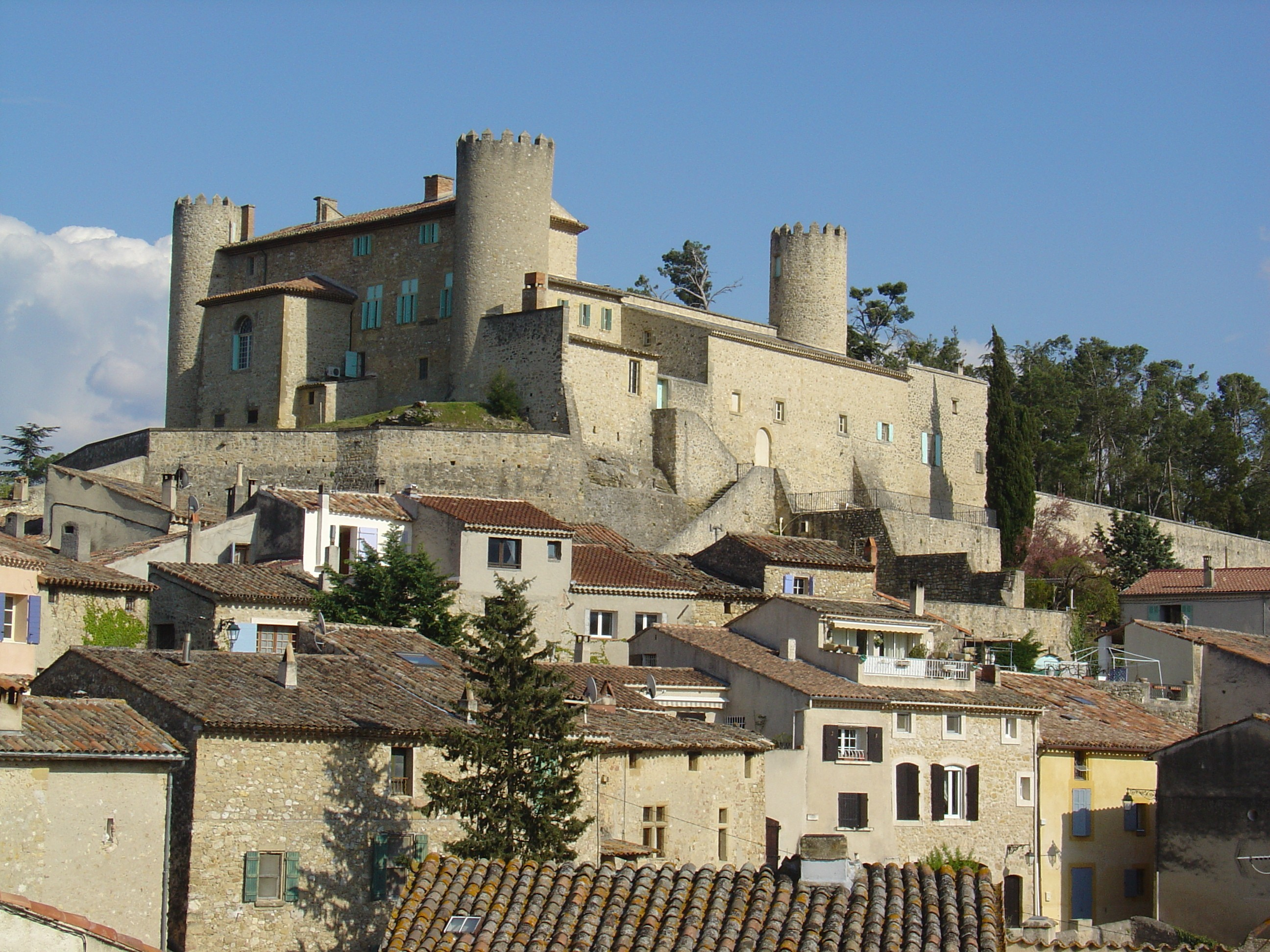
- The castle above the village

- Coat of arms
- Location of Mirabeau
- Location within France Location within Provence-Alpes-Côte d'Azur
- Coordinates: 43°42′18″N 5°39′24″E
- Country: France
- Region: Provence-Alpes-Côte d'Azur
- Department: Vaucluse
- Arrondissement: Apt
- Canton: Pertuis

Government
  - Mayor (2020–2026): Robert Tchobdrenovitch
- Area^{1}: 31.66 km^{2} (12.22 sq mi)
- Elevation: 330 m (1,080 ft)
- Highest elevation: 628 m (2,060 ft)
- Lowest elevation: 214 m (702 ft)
- Population (2023): 1,450
  - Density: 45.8/km^{2} (119/sq mi)
- Time zone: UTC+01:00 (CET)
  - Summer (DST): UTC+02:00 (CEST)
- INSEE/Postal code: 84076 /84120
- ^{1} French Land Register data, which excludes lakes, ponds, glaciers > 1 km^{2} (0.386 sq mi or 247 acres) and river estuaries.

Mirabeau (French pronunciation: [miʁabo]; Occitan: Mirabèu) is a commune in the Vaucluse department in the Provence-Alpes-Côte d'Azur region in southeastern France.

It has several buildings from the 13th century in the centre, including the Chapelle Sainte-Madeleine.

== Geography ==
The commune is situated at the exit of the water gap opened by the Durance (a tributary of the Rhone) in the limestone plateau that since the Middle Ages has been called the plateau of Saint-Sépulcre. The water gap of Mirabeau is used as a crossing the Durance, which for most of its length is wide and rapid.

The village is situated between the communes of Pertuis and Manosque at a place where four departments meet:Vaucluse, Bouches-du-Rhône, Alpes-de-Haute-Provence and Var. It is on Route Départementale 973.

Mirabeau village is in the Luberon Massif and is one of the 77 members of the parc naturel régional du Luberon.

=== Seismicity ===
The cantons of Bonnieux, Apt, Vaucluse, Cadenet, Cavaillon, and Pertuis are classified as Zone Ib (weak risk). All the other cantons in the department of Vaucluse are classified as Zone Ia (very weak risk). Seismicity in these zones only exceptionally causes the destruction of buildings. Since April 2018 the castle is closed for public visitors, due to the risk.

=== Land use ===
The following table shows how the land area is allocated for different purposes:

Type of land use	Per cent of total area	Area (hectares)
Urban areas	1.91%	60.13
Agricultural areas	29.15%	915.85
Natural areas	68.16%	2148.83
Total	100%	3152.62

The natural areas consist principally of the Mediterranean forests covering the Petit Luberon. The agricultural areas are mainly orchards (olive trees, almond trees), lavender fields, vineyards (Appellation d'origine contrôlée (AOC) Côtes du Luberon).

== Climate ==
The commune has a Mediterranean climate. Summers are hot and dry and there are sometimes storms. Winters are mild. Precipitation is infrequent and snow is rare. Protected by the Luberon Massif, the commune is partially sheltered from the mistral wind.

== Name ==
Mirabeau (in Provençal Mirabèu) comes from mirar (to see) and bel (beautiful). In the 12th century, Mirabel or Mirabellum meant an elevated place from where you can see a long way.

== History ==
=== Prehistory and antiquity ===
On the Saint-Sépulcre plateau the first traces of human occupation date from the La Tène culture in about 500 BCE. According to specialists, this defensive site, which has not been fully investigated, may hide other archaeological remains.

The Gallo-Roman period is represented by a pottery kiln found at a place called Le Moulin (the mill). It would have provided Gallic amphoras and dolia to the villa near the Ferme de l’Étang where mosaics have been found.

=== Middle Ages ===
The first castrum was built at the beginning of the 12th century. It was in existence when a papal bull of Pope Gelasius II in 1199 confirmed Mirabel as a possession of the abbey Saint-André de Villeneuve-lès-Avignon. Fifty years later, a bull of Pope Alexander III renewed the rights of the Benedictines of Mont Andaon over Mirabello, with obligation to serve the priory consecrated to the Beate Mariae Magdalena de Ponte Cantus Pernicis.

In 1189, the Hospitaliers du Pont de Bonpas, in order to control the passage by ferry over the Durance river in the gorge of Mirabeau built a house near the chapel dedicated to La Magdaleine. This chapel of Cante Perdrix, one of the oldest priories in Provence dedicated to La Magdaleine, became the place of worship of a guild of ferrymen on the Durance. Its façade still bears an inscription on the subject of a solar eclipse in the 13th century.

== See also ==
- Côtes du Luberon AOC
- Luberon
- Communes of the Vaucluse department
