= Les Mées, Alpes-de-Haute-Provence =

Les Mées
- Commune
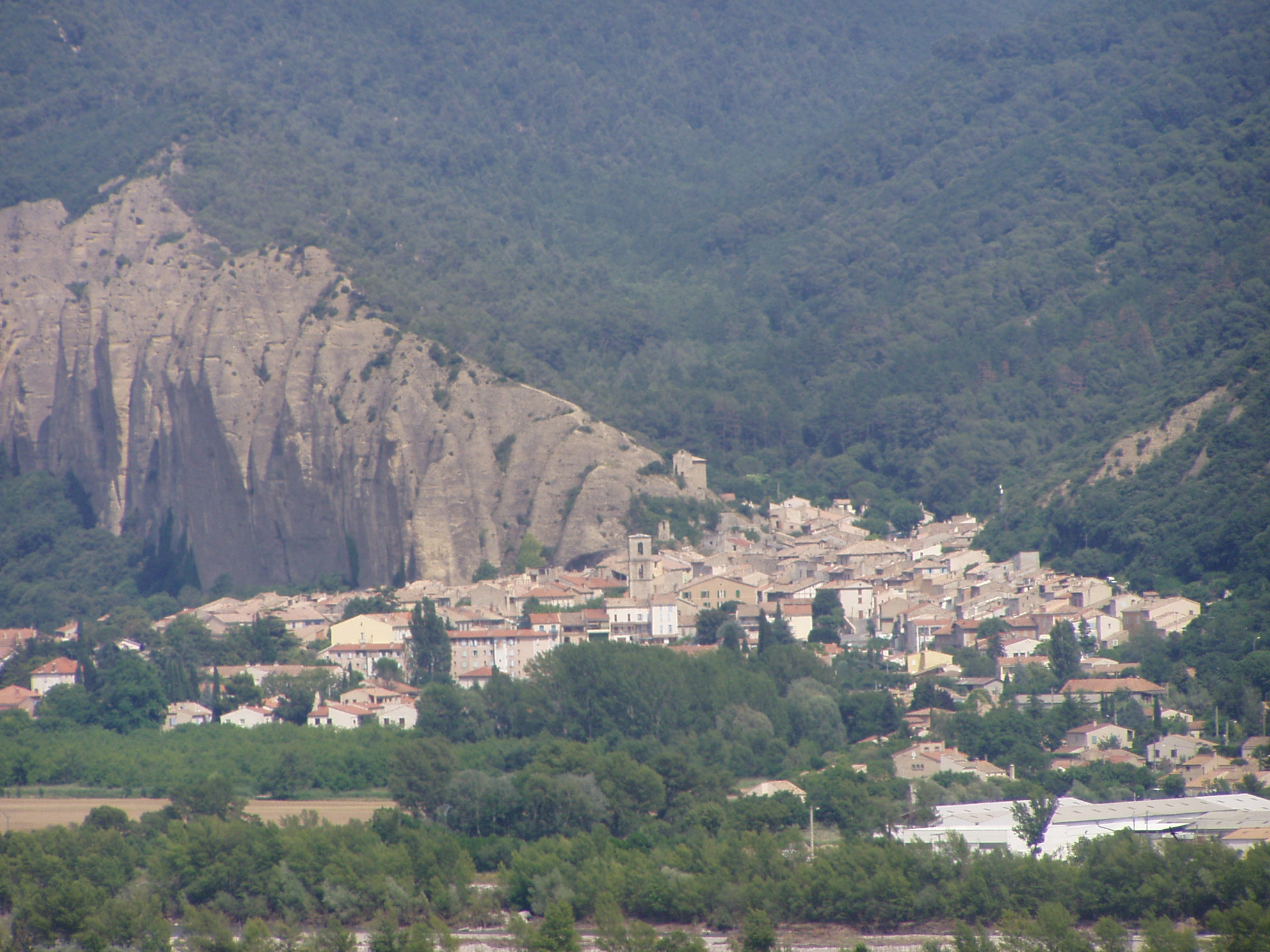
- The village of Les Mées, seen from the village of Peyruis

- Coat of arms
- Location of Les Mées
- Location within France Location within Provence-Alpes-Côte d'Azur
- Coordinates: 44°01′50″N 5°58′38″E
- Country: France
- Region: Provence-Alpes-Côte d'Azur
- Department: Alpes-de-Haute-Provence
- Arrondissement: Digne-les-Bains
- Canton: Oraison
- Intercommunality: CA Provence-Alpes

Government
  - Mayor (2026–32): Max Eymard
- Area^{1}: 65.4 km^{2} (25.3 sq mi)
- Elevation: 410 m (1,350 ft)
- Highest elevation: 824 m (2,703 ft)
- Lowest elevation: 348 m (1,142 ft)
- Population (2023): 4,099
  - Density: 62.7/km^{2} (162/sq mi)
- Time zone: UTC+01:00 (CET)
  - Summer (DST): UTC+02:00 (CEST)
- INSEE/Postal code: 04116 /04190
- ^{1} French Land Register data, which excludes lakes, ponds, glaciers > 1 km^{2} (0.386 sq mi or 247 acres) and river estuaries.

Les Mées (French pronunciation: [le me] or [le mɛs]; Occitan: Lei Mès) is a commune in the Alpes-de-Haute-Provence department in southeastern France.

== History ==
The name Les Mées derives from the Latin metae, meaning 'cones' or 'pyramids', or the Occitan Lei Mèas, meaning 'millstone of wheat', referring to the shape of the rock formations that rise above the village, known as the Penitents of Les Mées. According to legend, the Penitents are monks from the Montagne de Lure who were petrified by Saint Donatus as punishment for falling in love with Moorish women brought back from a crusade. The hooded shapes of the rocks resemble a procession of monks in penance.

== Geography ==
The Bléone forms the commune's northern border, then flows into the Durance, which forms the commune's western border.

== Population ==
Historical population

Year	Pop.	±% p.a.
1793	1,805	—
1806	2,209	+1.57%
1821	2,146	−0.19%
1831	2,129	−0.08%
1836	2,082	−0.45%
1841	2,030	−0.50%
1846	1,950	−0.80%
1851	1,983	+0.34%
1856	1,964	−0.19%
1861	2,030	+0.66%
1866	2,116	+0.83%
1872	2,165	+0.38%
1876	2,214	+0.56%
1881	2,124	−0.83%
1886	2,034	−0.86%
1891	1,993	−0.41%
1896	1,922	−0.72%
1901	1,924	+0.02%

Year	Pop.	±% p.a.
1906	1,753	−1.84%
1911	1,783	+0.34%
1921	1,491	−1.77%
1926	1,449	−0.57%
1931	1,451	+0.03%
1936	1,390	−0.86%
1946	1,542	+1.04%
1954	1,566	+0.19%
1962	2,370	+5.32%
1968	2,063	−2.29%
1975	2,128	+0.44%
1982	2,275	+0.96%
1990	2,601	+1.69%
1999	2,925	+1.31%
2007	3,413	+1.95%
2012	3,548	+0.78%
2017	3,735	+1.03%
2023	4,099	+1.56%

Source: EHESS and INSEE (1968-2023)

== See also ==
- Communes of the Alpes-de-Haute-Provence department
