= Étang de la Bonde =

Lake in Vaucluse, Provence-Alpes-Côte d'Azur, France

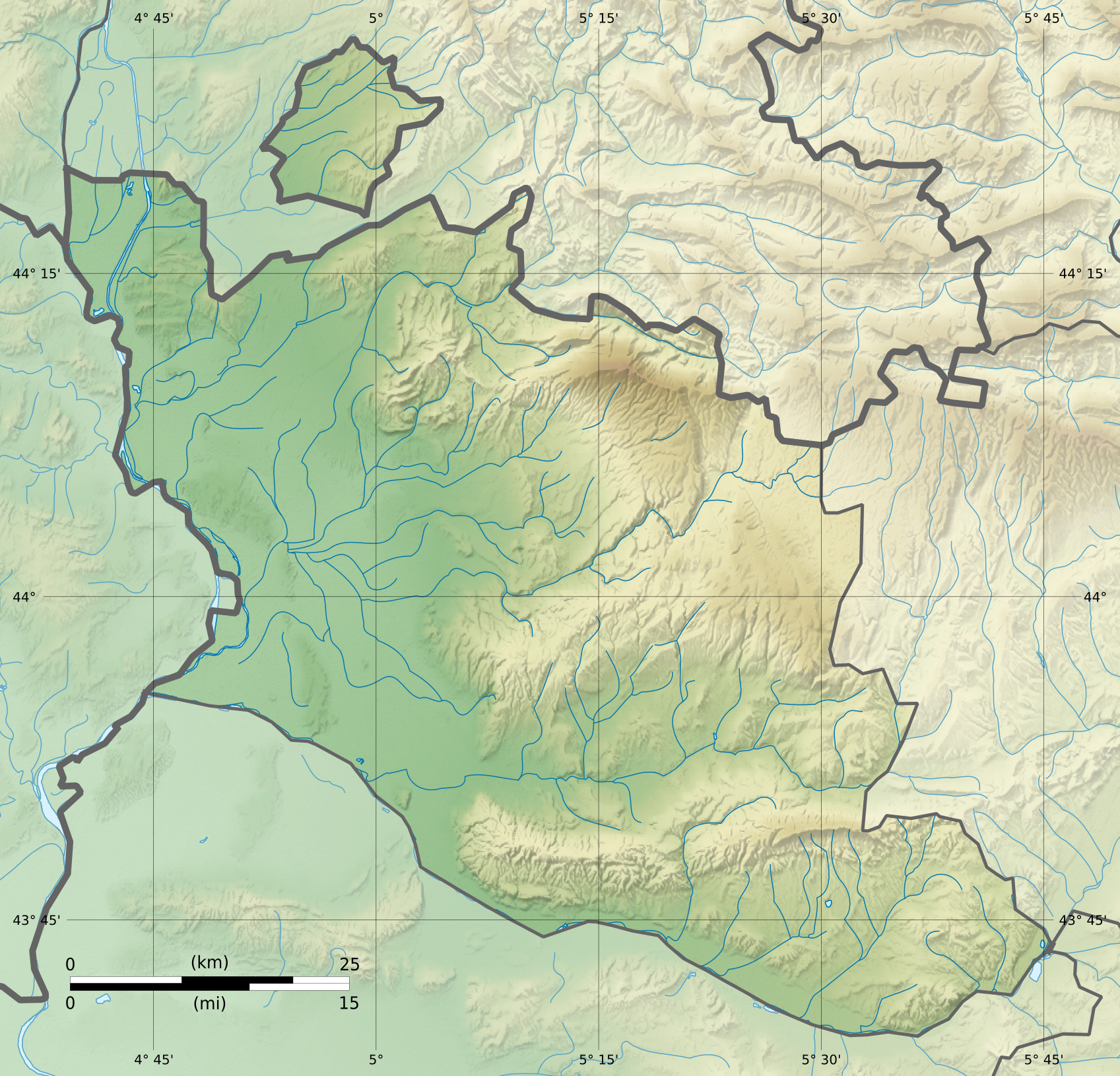
- Location within Vaucluse
- Location: Vaucluse
- Coordinates: 43°45′42″N 5°30′24″E
- Lake type: artificial-regulated
- Primary outflows: Eze
- Basin countries: France
- Surface area: 0.3 km^{2} (0.12 sq mi)
- Average depth: 2 m (6.6 ft)
- Max. depth: 5 m (16 ft)

Étang de la Bonde is a manmade lake in Vaucluse, France. Its surface area is 0.3 km².

The lake is shared by the communes of Cabrières-d'Aigues and La Motte-d'Aigues.
