= Canton of Oraison =

Coordinates: 43.92°N 5.92°E

- Canton
- Situation of the canton of Oraison in the department of Alpes-de-Haute-Provence
- Country: France
- Region: Provence-Alpes-Côte d'Azur
- Department: Alpes-de-Haute-Provence
- No. of communes: {{{nbcomm}}}
- Population (2023): 14,614
- INSEE code: 0410

The canton of Oraison is an administrative division of the Alpes-de-Haute-Provence department, in southeastern France. It was created at the French canton reorganisation which came into effect in March 2015. Its seat is in Oraison.

It consists of the following communes:

1. Les Mées
2. Oraison
3. Villeneuve
