= Oraison =

Oraison Aureson (Occitan)
- Commune
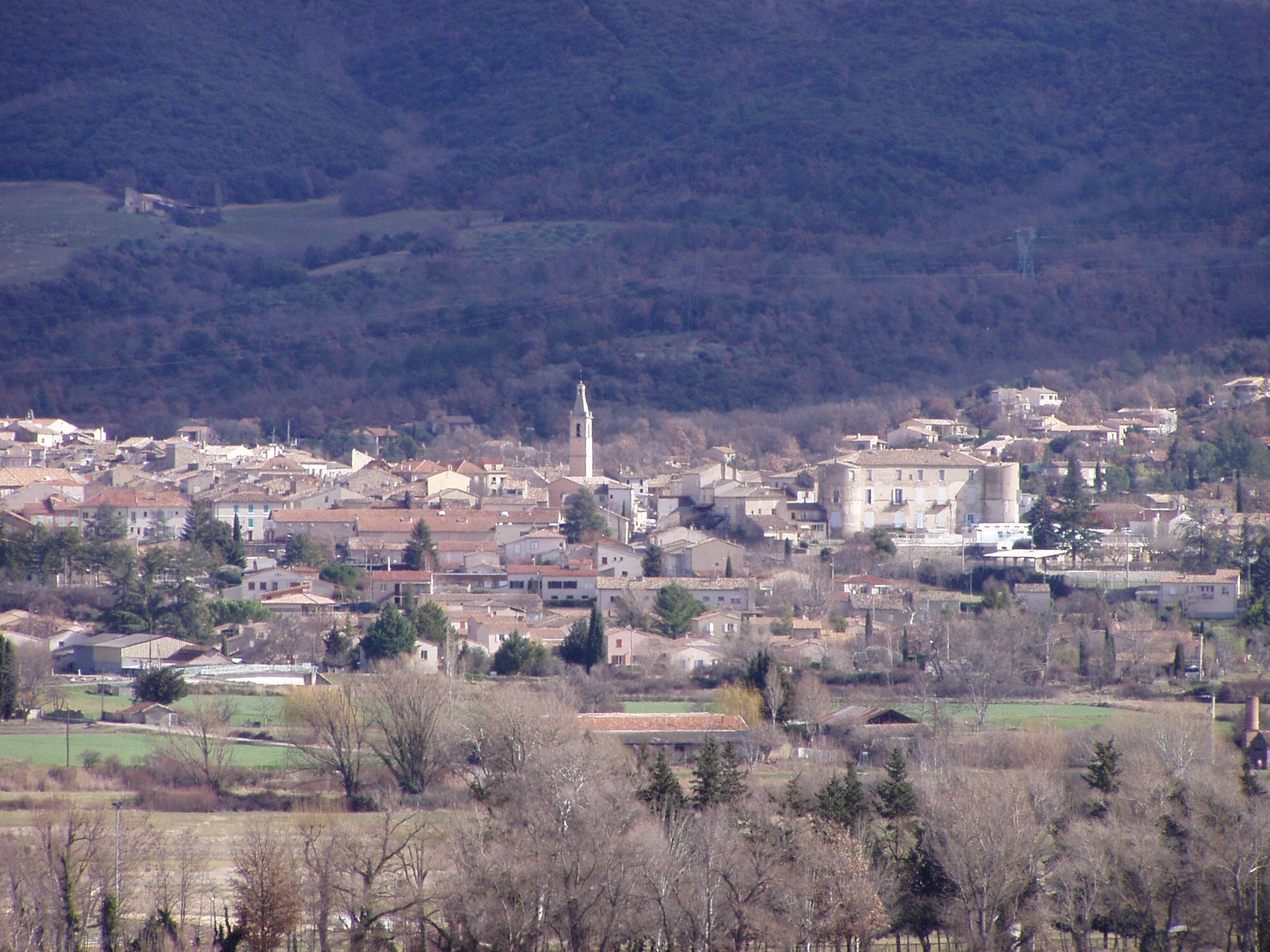
- A general view of the village of Oraison

- Coat of arms
- Location of Oraison
- Location within France Location within Provence-Alpes-Côte d'Azur
- Coordinates: 43°55′05″N 5°55′09″E
- Country: France
- Region: Provence-Alpes-Côte d'Azur
- Department: Alpes-de-Haute-Provence
- Arrondissement: Forcalquier
- Canton: Oraison
- Intercommunality: Durance-Luberon-Verdon Agglomération

Government
  - Mayor (2026–32): Benoît Gauvan (LREM)
- Area^{1}: 38.42 km^{2} (14.83 sq mi)
- Elevation: 373 m (1,224 ft)
- Highest elevation: 645 m (2,116 ft)
- Lowest elevation: 323 m (1,060 ft)
- Population (2023): 6,155
  - Density: 160.2/km^{2} (414.9/sq mi)
- Demonym: Oraisonnais
- Time zone: UTC+01:00 (CET)
  - Summer (DST): UTC+02:00 (CEST)
- INSEE/Postal code: 04143 /04700
- Website: oraison.fr
- ^{1} French Land Register data, which excludes lakes, ponds, glaciers > 1 km^{2} (0.386 sq mi or 247 acres) and river estuaries.

Oraison (French pronunciation: [ɔʁɛzɔ̃]; Occitan: Aureson) is a commune in the Alpes-de-Haute-Provence department in Southeastern France.

== Geography ==
The river Asse forms all of the commune's southern border, then flows into the Durance, which forms all of its western border.

== Population ==
Historical population

Year	Pop.	±% p.a.
1793	1,555	—
1806	1,404	−0.78%
1821	1,471	+0.31%
1831	1,736	+1.67%
1836	1,892	+1.74%
1841	1,855	−0.39%
1846	1,871	+0.17%
1851	1,946	+0.79%
1856	1,998	+0.53%
1861	1,995	−0.03%
1866	2,055	+0.59%
1872	1,962	−0.77%
1876	1,980	+0.23%
1881	1,820	−1.67%
1886	1,780	−0.44%
1891	1,752	−0.32%
1896	1,899	+1.62%
1901	1,944	+0.47%

Year	Pop.	±% p.a.
1906	2,153	+2.06%
1911	2,044	−1.03%
1921	1,735	−1.63%
1926	1,773	+0.43%
1931	1,936	+1.77%
1936	1,784	−1.62%
1946	1,834	+0.28%
1954	1,982	+0.97%
1962	3,054	+5.55%
1968	2,702	−2.02%
1975	2,667	−0.19%
1982	2,963	+1.51%
1990	3,509	+2.14%
1999	4,114	+1.78%
2007	4,999	+2.47%
2012	5,598	+2.29%
2017	5,882	+0.99%
2023	6,155	+0.76%

Source: EHESS and INSEE (1968-2023)

== See also ==
- Communes of the Alpes-de-Haute-Provence department
