= Bénézet =

Catholic saint, patron of Avignon

Saint Bénézet
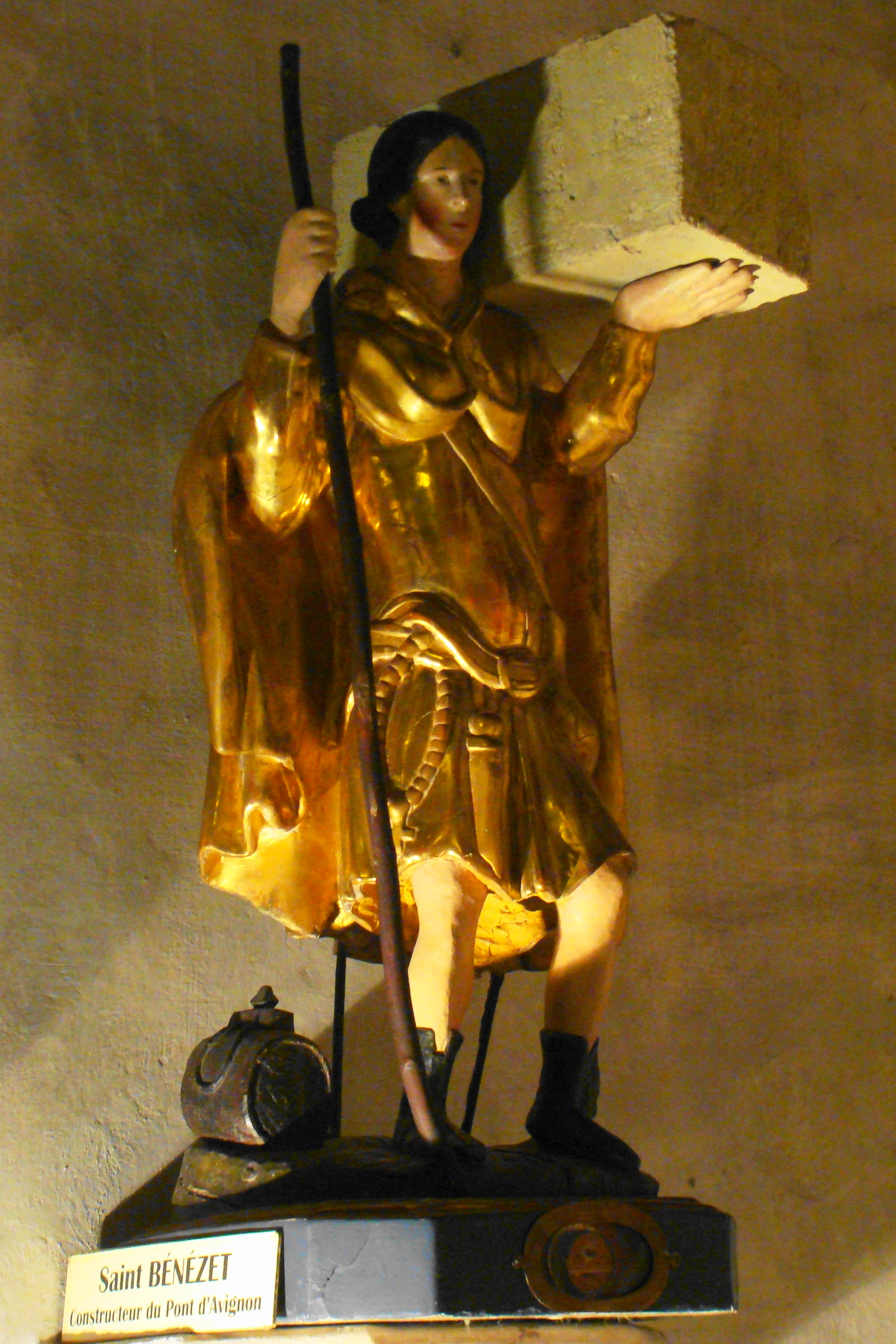
- The statue of Saint Bénézet in Notre Dame des Doms, Avignon
- Born: c. 1163; Hermillon, Savoy, France
- Died: 1184
- Venerated in: Roman Catholic Church
- Feast: April 14
- Attributes: portrayed as a boy carrying a large stone on his shoulder
- Patronage: Avignon; bachelors; bridge-builders

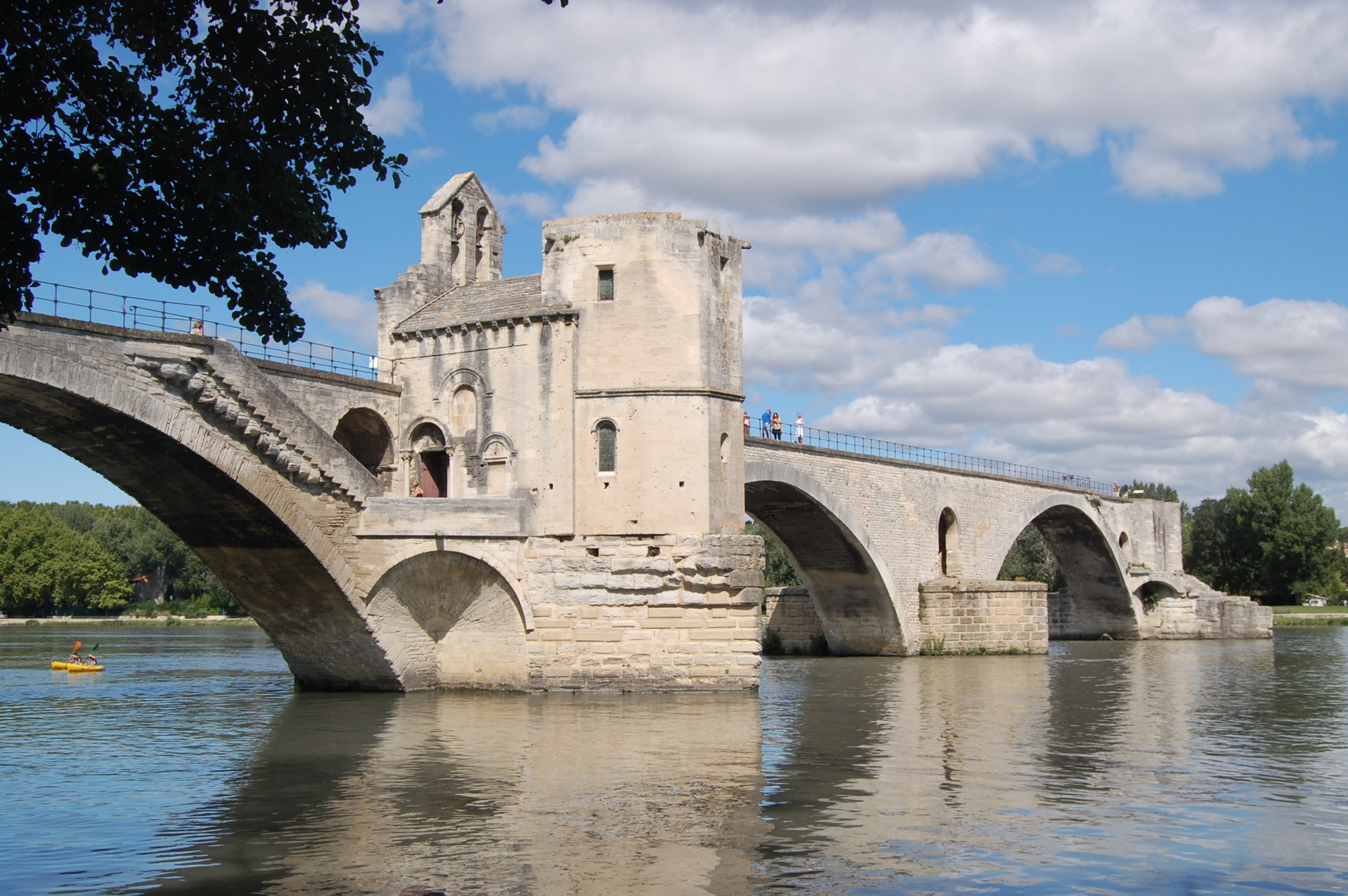
The north side of the Pont Saint-Bénézet with the Chapel of Saint Nicholas

Bénézet (also Benedict, Benezet, Benet, Benoît; c. 1163 – 1184) is a saint of the Catholic Church.

== Biography ==
Christian tradition states that he was a shepherd boy who had a vision during an eclipse in 1177, which led him to build a bridge over the Rhône River at Avignon.

He was told that angels would watch over his flocks in his absence. He built the bridge single-handedly, as ecclesiastical and civil authorities refused to help him. Bénézet, it is said, lifted a huge stone into place, and announced it would be the start of the foundation. This would become the Pont Saint-Bénézet.

According to the legend, there were shouts of "Miracle! Miracle!" when Bénézet had laid the first stone. Eighteen miracles occurred during this incident, including the blind having their sight restored, the deaf hearing again, cripples walking, and hunchbacks had their backs straightened.

Bénézet thus won support for his project from wealthy sponsors who, it is claimed, formed themselves into the Bridge-Building Brotherhood to fund the bridge’s construction.

== Veneration ==
After his death, Bénézet was interred on the bridge itself, in a small chapel dedicated to Saint Nicholas, patron saint of mariners, standing on one of the bridge's surviving piers on the Avignon side. His relics were enshrined there until 1669, when a flood washed away part of the bridge. His coffin, recovered, was opened and the body of Bénézet was found to be incorrupt. The relics were translated to Avignon Cathedral and thence to the Celestine church of Saint Didier. The remains of the bridge are still a pilgrimage site.

== See also ==
- List of Catholic saints
