= Remollon =

- Commune
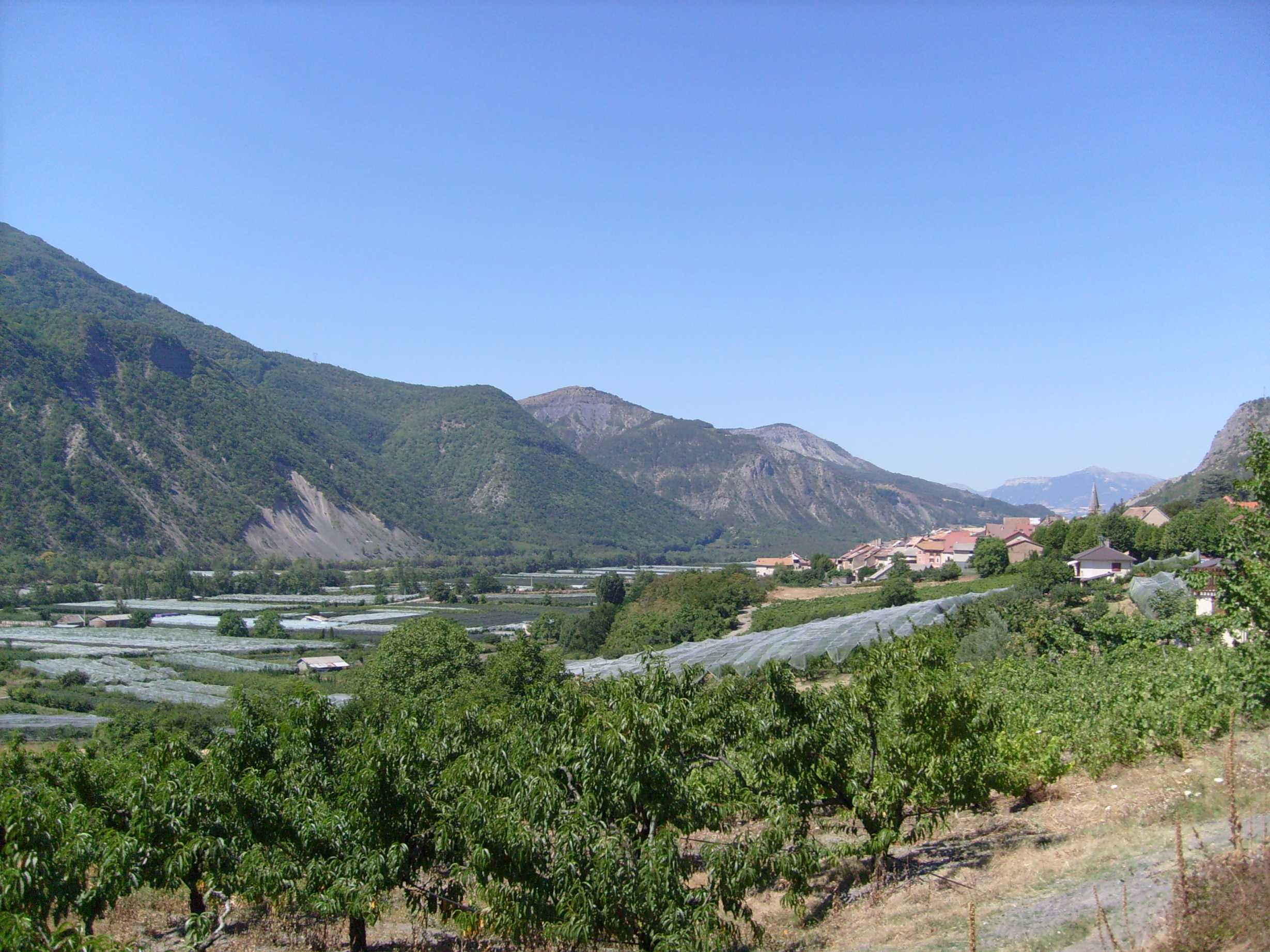

- Coat of arms
- Location of Remollon
- Location within France Location within Provence-Alpes-Côte d'Azur
- Coordinates: 44°28′07″N 6°10′06″E
- Country: France
- Region: Provence-Alpes-Côte d'Azur
- Department: Hautes-Alpes
- Arrondissement: Gap
- Canton: Chorges
- Intercommunality: Serre-Ponçon Val d'Avance

Government
  - Mayor (2026–32): Bertrand Baulet
- Area^{1}: 6.45 km^{2} (2.49 sq mi)
- Elevation: 670 m (2,200 ft)
- Highest elevation: 1,400 m (4,600 ft)
- Lowest elevation: 610 m (2,000 ft)
- Population (2023): 469
  - Density: 72.7/km^{2} (188/sq mi)
- Time zone: UTC+01:00 (CET)
  - Summer (DST): UTC+02:00 (CEST)
- INSEE/Postal code: 05115 /05190
- ^{1} French Land Register data, which excludes lakes, ponds, glaciers > 1 km^{2} (0.386 sq mi or 247 acres) and river estuaries.

Remollon (French pronunciation: [ʁəmɔlɔ̃]; Occitan: Remolon) is a commune in the Hautes-Alpes department in southeastern France.

== Population ==
Historical population
Year	Pop.	±% p.a.
1968	295	—
1975	259	−1.84%
1982	278	+1.02%
1990	332	+2.24%
1999	398	+2.04%
2007	422	+0.73%
2012	440	+0.84%
2017	442	+0.09%
2023	469	+0.99%
Source: INSEE

== See also ==
- Communes of the Hautes-Alpes department
