= Avance (Durance) =

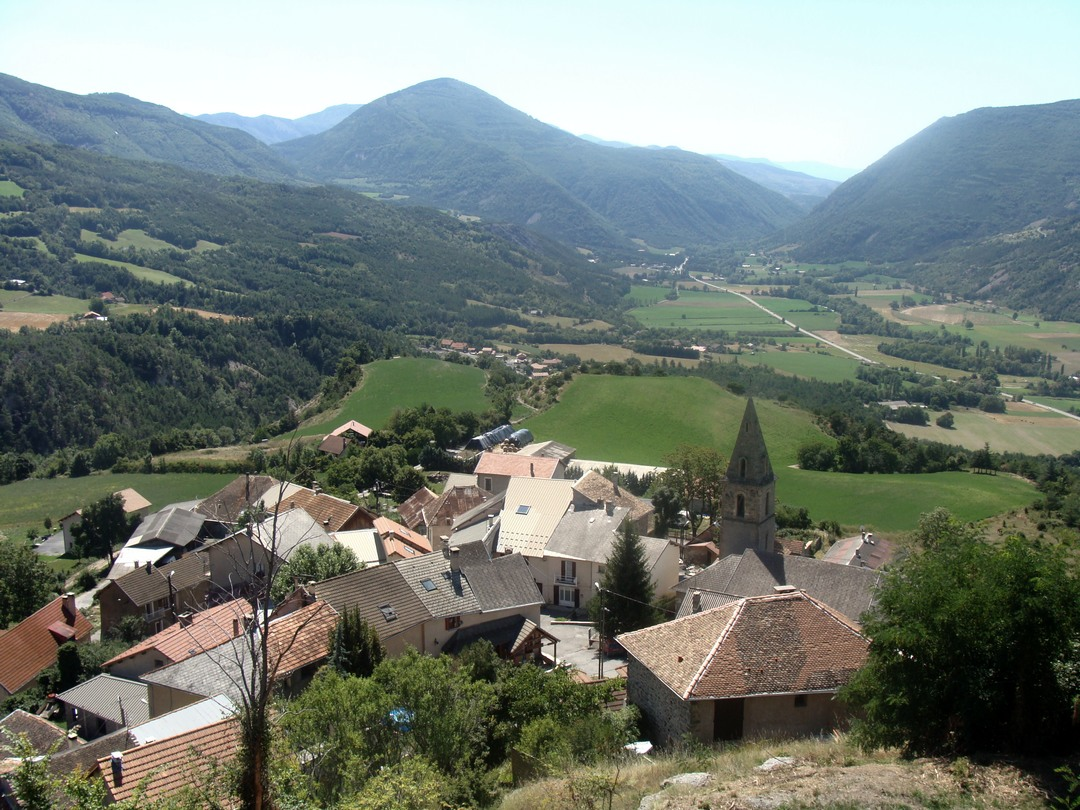

- Location within France Location within Provence-Alpes-Côte d'Azur

Physical characteristics
- Mouth
  - location: Durance
  - coordinates: 44.4758°N 6.0972°E
- Length: 20.65 km (12.83 mi)
- Basin size: 107 km^{2} (41 sq mi)

Basin features
- Progression: Durance→ Rhône→ Mediterranean Sea

The Avance (French pronunciation: [avɑ̃s]) is a river in the Hautes Alpes department, France. It is a right tributary of the Durance. It is 20.65 km (12.83 mi) long. Its drainage basin is 107 km^{2} (41 sq mi).
