= Avance (Garonne) =

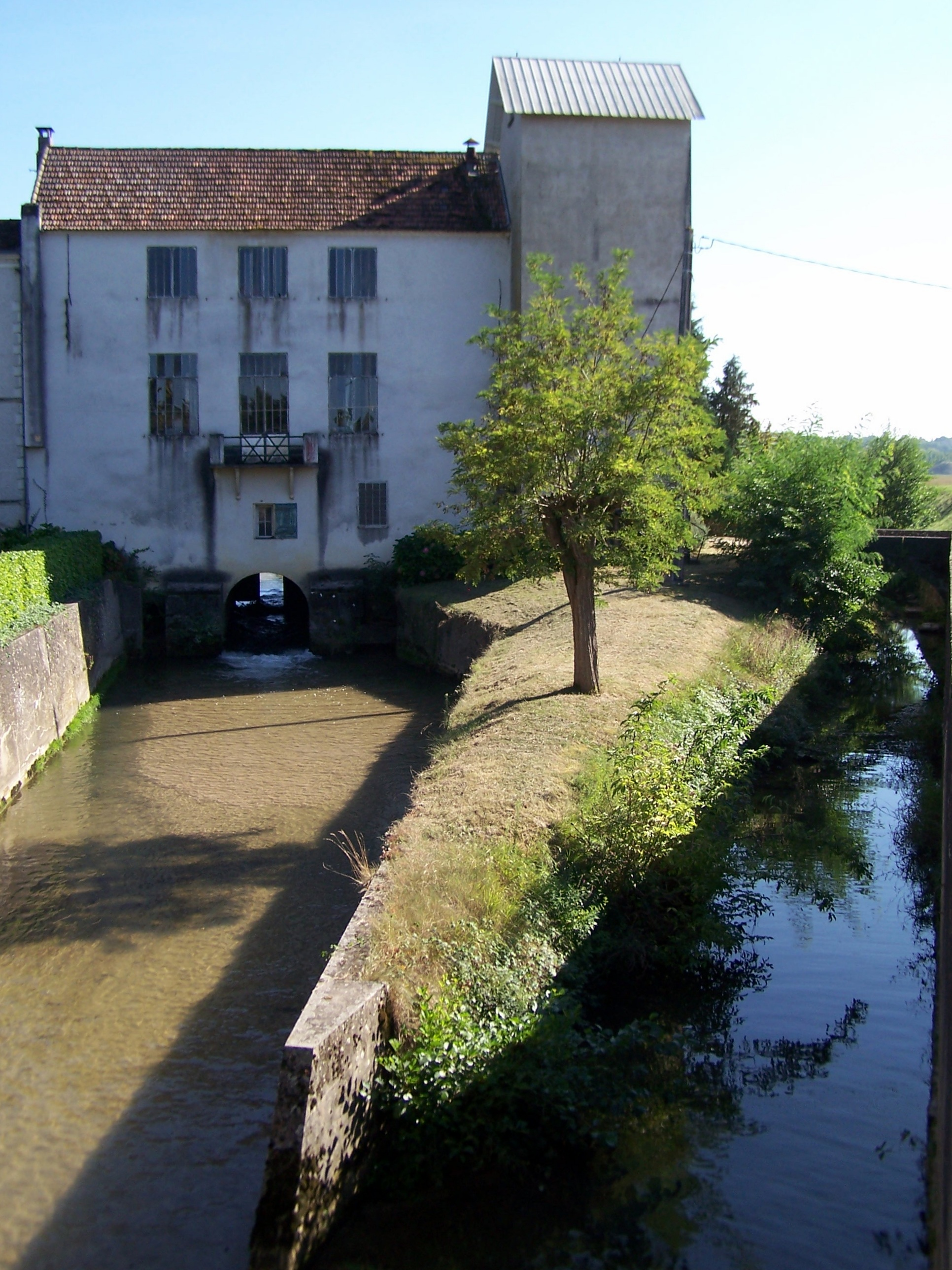
- Mill over the Avance at Gaujac

- Location within France Location within Nouvelle-Aquitaine

Physical characteristics
- Mouth: Garonne
  - coordinates: 44.5008°N 0.1050°E
- Length: 56 km (35 mi)

Basin features
- Progression: Garonne→ Gironde estuary→ Atlantic Ocean

The Avance (French pronunciation: [avɑ̃s]) is a river in Nouvelle-Aquitaine, France. It is a left tributary of the Garonne, into which it flows near Marmande. It is 56 km (35 mi) long.
