= Cabrières-d'Aigues =

- Commune
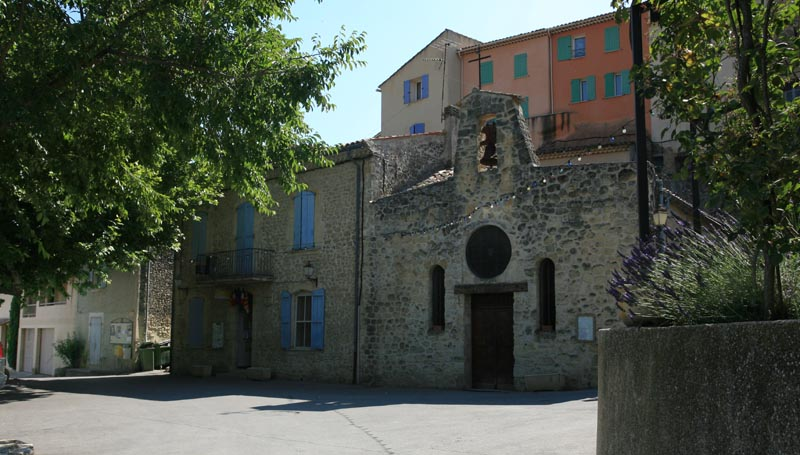
- The village of Cabrières-d'Aigues

- Coat of arms
- Location of Cabrières-d'Aigues
- Location within France Location within Provence-Alpes-Côte d'Azur
- Coordinates: 43°47′07″N 5°29′49″E
- Country: France
- Region: Provence-Alpes-Côte d'Azur
- Department: Vaucluse
- Arrondissement: Apt
- Canton: Pertuis

Government
  - Mayor (2020–2026): Geneviève Jean
- Area^{1}: 18.96 km^{2} (7.32 sq mi)
- Elevation: 375 m (1,230 ft)
- Highest elevation: 1,122 m (3,681 ft)
- Lowest elevation: 300 m (980 ft)
- Population (2023): 946
  - Density: 49.9/km^{2} (129/sq mi)
- Time zone: UTC+01:00 (CET)
  - Summer (DST): UTC+02:00 (CEST)
- INSEE/Postal code: 84024 /84240
- ^{1} French Land Register data, which excludes lakes, ponds, glaciers > 1 km^{2} (0.386 sq mi or 247 acres) and river estuaries.

Cabrières-d'Aigues (French pronunciation: [kabʁijɛʁ dɛɡ]; Provençal: Cabrièras d'Egues) is a commune in the Vaucluse department in the Provence-Alpes-Côte d'Azur region in southeastern France.

== See also ==
- Côtes du Luberon AOC
- Communes of the Vaucluse department
- Étang de la Bonde
- Luberon
