= Avance, South Dakota =

Coordinates: 44°55′06″N 102°14′52″W

Avance is a ghost town in Meade County, located in the state of South Dakota).

== History ==
A post office called Avance was established in 1910, and remained in operation until 1951. The town had the name of John Avance, a local cattleman.
