= Alpes-de-Haute-Provence =

Department in Provence-Alpes-Côte d'Azur, France

Alpes-de-Haute-Provence Aups d'Auta Provença (Occitan)
- Department
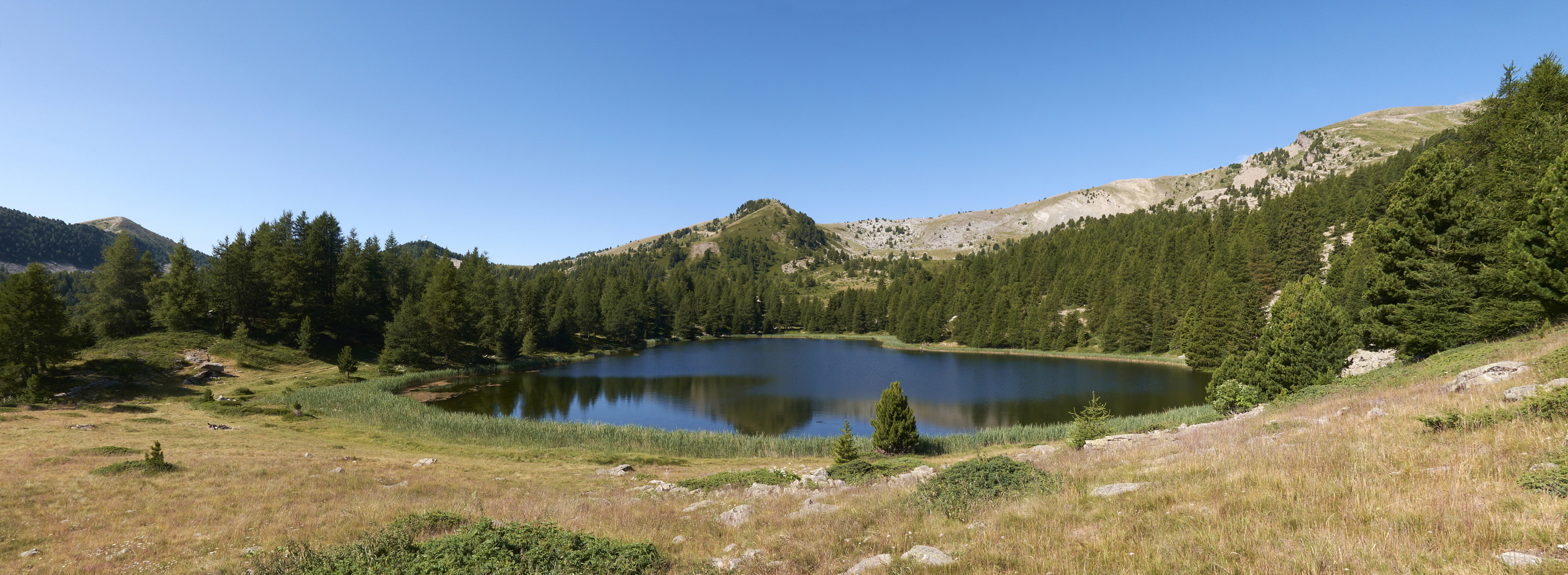
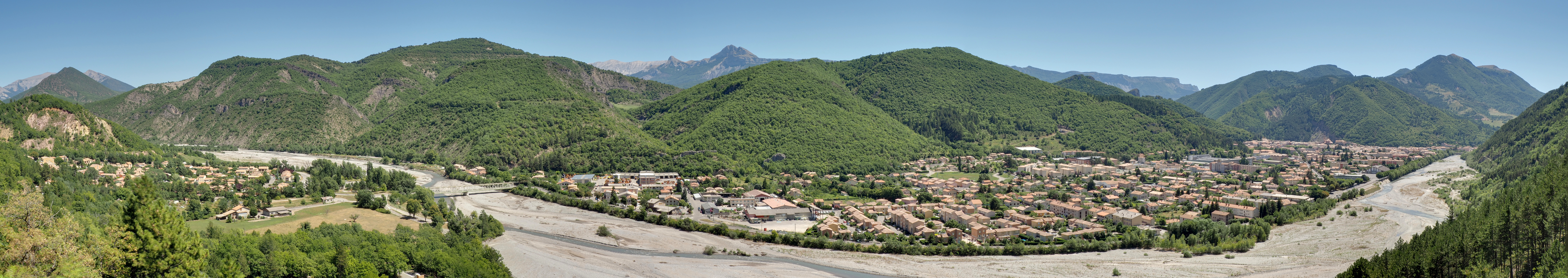
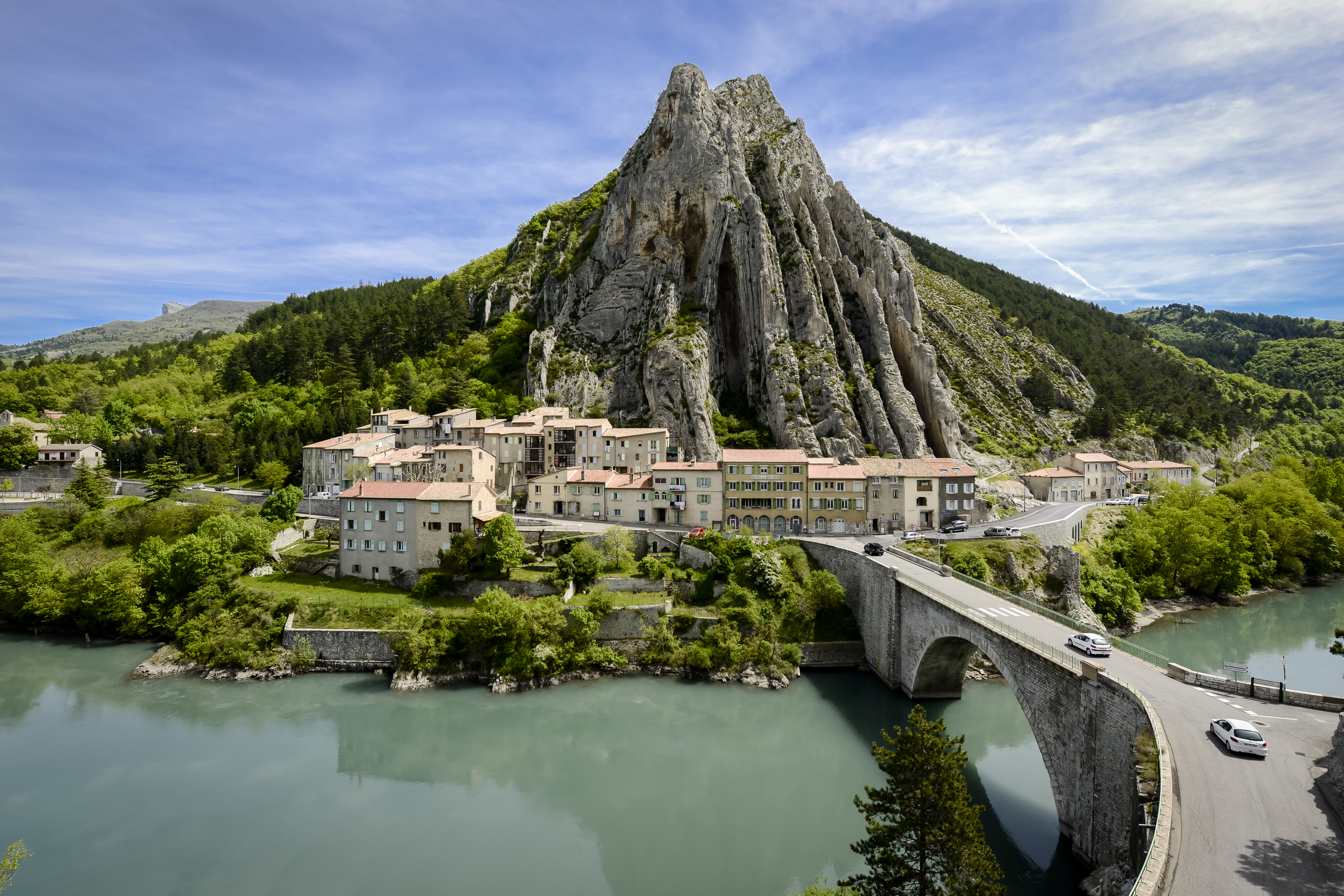
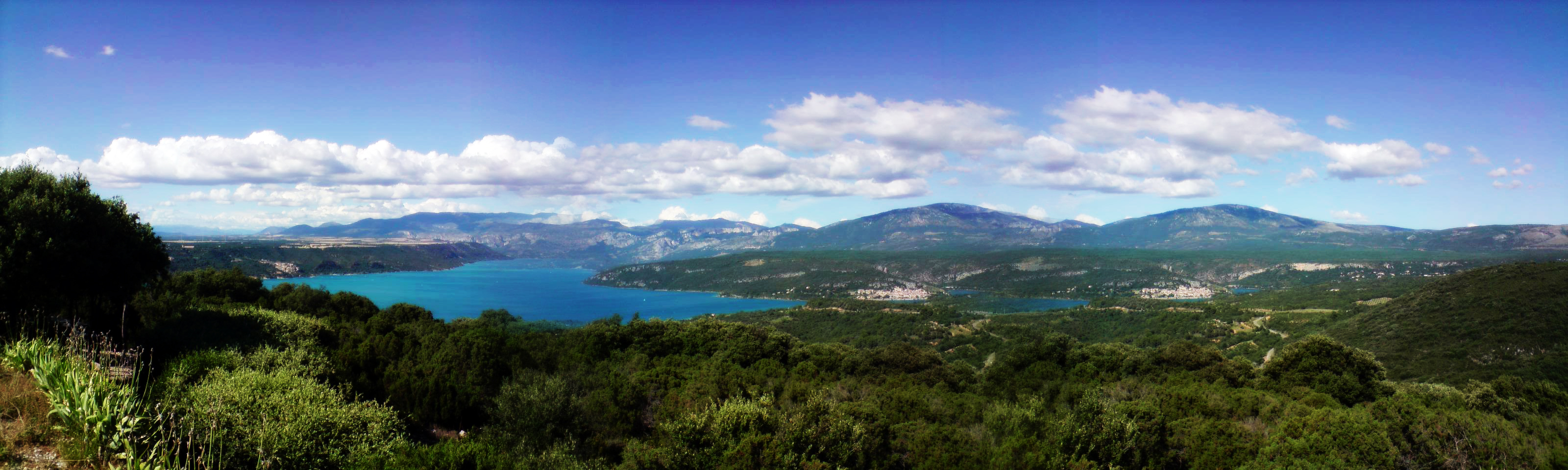
- From top down: Le Lauzet-Ubaye, Digne-les-Bains, Sisteron and Lake of Sainte-Croix

- Flag Coat of arms

- Location of Alpes-de-Haute-Provence in France
- Coordinates: 44°0′N 6°10′E
- Country: France
- Region: Provence-Alpes-Côte d'Azur
- Prefecture: Digne-les-Bains
- Subprefectures: Barcelonnette; Castellane; Forcalquier

Government
  - President of the Departmental Council: Éliane Barreille (LR)

Area^{1}
  - Total: 6,925 km^{2} (2,674 sq mi)

Population (2023)
  - Total: 168,054
  - Rank: 95th
  - Density: 24.27/km^{2} (62.85/sq mi)
- Time zone: UTC+1 (CET)
  - Summer (DST): UTC+2 (CEST)
- Department number: 04
- Largest city: Manosque
- Arrondissements: 4
- Cantons: 15
- Communes: 198
- ^1 French Land Register data, which exclude estuaries and lakes, ponds and glaciers larger than 1 km^{2}

Alpes-de-Haute-Provence (sometimes abbreviated as AHP; French pronunciation: [alp də ot pʁɔvɑ̃s]; Occitan: Aups d'Auta Provença; lit. 'Alps of Upper Provence'), formerly until 1970 known as Basses-Alpes (French pronunciation: [basz‿alp], lit. 'Lower Alps'), is a department in the Provence-Alpes-Côte d'Azur region of France, bordering Alpes-Maritimes and Italy to the east, Var to the south, Vaucluse to the west, Drôme and Hautes-Alpes to the north. Formerly part of the province of Provence, it had a population of 168,054 in 2023, which makes it the 8th least populated French department.

Alpes-de-Haute-Provence's main cities are Digne-les-Bains (prefecture), Manosque, Sisteron, Barcelonnette, Castellane and Forcalquier. Inhabitants are called the Bas-Alpins (masculine) or Bas-Alpines (feminine) in reference to the department's former name, Basses-Alpes, which was in use until 1970. Although the prefecture is Digne-les-Bains, the largest city is Manosque. Alpes-de-Haute-Provence's INSEE and postal code is 04.

== Geography ==
The departmental can be divided into three zones depending on the terrain, climate, population and economy:

- the plateaux, hills and valleys of Haute-Provence, which comprise one-third of the area but two-thirds of the population and the most important cities of the department with almost all of the economic activity apart from mountain tourism. The valley of the Durance, the artery of the department, cuts the rest of the department into two parts:
- the Lower Alps: an intermediate mountain area with valleys and very remote villages
- the High Alps: including the valleys of Ubaye, Blanche, and the high Verdon (upstream of Colmars-les-Alpes) where the economy is built around mountain tourism (skiing). In the Haute-Ubaye, the mountain peaks exceed 3000 m above sea level and all the passes are close to or above 2000 m in altitude. In this part of the department is one of the highest roads in Europe: the main road D64 reaches an altitude of 2802 m near the Col de la Bonette (2715 m) and connects the region of Barcelonnette to the Tinée and Vésubie valleys.

The relief of the land compartmentalises the region: the enclosed valleys are difficult to access, so dividing the country into as many local areas which communicate very little with the outside. In 1877, 55 communes only had access to trails or mule paths.

The seismic hazard is moderate (zone 3) to medium (zone 4) with different faults such as the Durance located in the department.

=== Hydrology ===
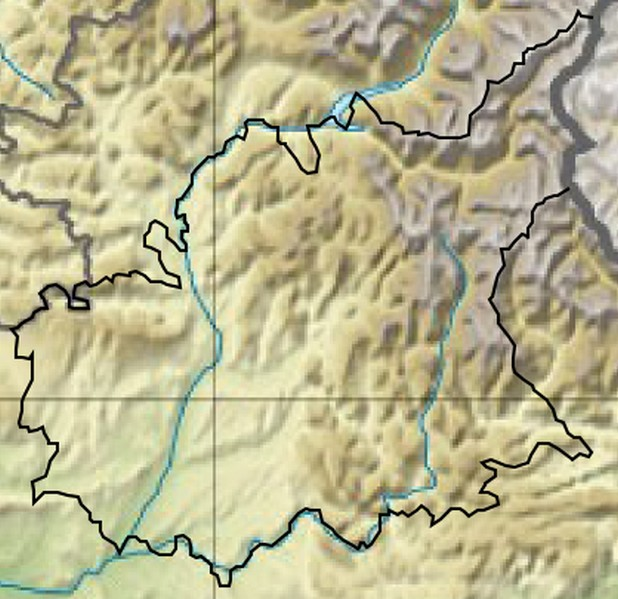
Hydrology and topography

The main river is the Durance which runs in the west of the department. It is in the Durance valley that the most important traffic routes are found: the A51 autoroute and the railway main line. Almost all of the department is in the watershed of the Durance except for the extreme south-east (the cantons of Annot and Entrevaux) which are drained by the Var.

The main tributaries of the Durance in the department are the Ubaye, the Bléone, the Asse, the Verdon on the left bank, the Buëch, the Jabron, and the Largue on the right bank.

The Durance and its tributaries have a torrential character, with a transition between the snow regime of the high valleys and the Mediterranean rainfall regime in the lower mountains and below. The summer low water levels are severe and violent floods occur when heavy rains fall which is often in autumn. The Durance, Verdon, Bléone and Buëch have had the construction of several dams and the diversion of parts of the river for irrigation and power generation in the 20th century.

=== Climate ===
The climate of the Alpes-de-Haute-Provence department is a Mediterranean climate degrading by altitude and latitude. In fact, while in the lower valleys and flat lands of Haute-Provence an inland Mediterranean climate prevails, by contrast in the hills it is more mixed with the valley of the Ubaye characteristic of the inner Alps, with a marked continentality: winters are very harsh with stormy summers. In between, the two influences mingle in the area of the Lower Alps. The characteristics of both climate trends are found throughout the department to a greater or lesser extent:

- dry air and little fog (less than 20 days per year)
- infrequent rainfall (less than 90 days per year) but heavy (650 to 1500 mm per year)
- frequent thunderstorms in the mountains in summer
- High sunshine hours in all seasons (2550 to 2850 hours per year)
- high thermal amplitudes, diurnal (over 10 °C) and annual (18 °C)
- fresh and bright winters
- very hot summers barely tempered by altitude.

Haute-Provence is therefore of interest to European astronomers looking for a partly cloudy night sky and one not affected by light pollution. Many amateur observatories have been built, and the Observatoire de Haute-Provence is one of the largest observatories in continental Europe. It is an active astronomy research centre.

Comparison of local Meteorological data with other cities in France
Town	Sunshine (hours/yr)	Rain (mm/yr)	Snow (days/yr)	Storm (days/yr)	Fog (days/yr)
National average	1,973	770	14	22	40
Saint Auban	2,774	695	9	33	6
Paris	1,661	637	12	18	10
Nice	2,724	767	1	29	1
Strasbourg	1,693	665	29	29	56
Brest	1,605	1,211	7	12	75

Climate data for Saint Auban
Month	Jan	Feb	Mar	Apr	May	Jun	Jul	Aug	Sep	Oct	Nov	Dec	Year
Mean daily maximum °C (°F)	9.0 (48.2)	10.8 (51.4)	14.6 (58.3)	17.2 (63.0)	21.7 (71.1)	26.1 (79.0)	29.9 (85.8)	29.3 (84.7)	24.4 (75.9)	19.0 (66.2)	13.0 (55.4)	9.2 (48.6)	18.7 (65.7)
Daily mean °C (°F)	4.3 (39.7)	5.4 (41.7)	8.7 (47.7)	11.3 (52.3)	15.5 (59.9)	20.0 (68.0)	22.7 (72.9)	22.3 (72.1)	18.2 (64.8)	13.6 (56.5)	8.3 (46.9)	4.9 (40.8)	12.9 (55.2)
Mean daily minimum °C (°F)	−0.4 (31.3)	0.0 (32.0)	2.8 (37.0)	5.4 (41.7)	9.2 (48.6)	12.8 (55.0)	15.5 (59.9)	15.3 (59.5)	11.9 (53.4)	8.2 (46.8)	3.6 (38.5)	0.6 (33.1)	7.1 (44.8)
Average precipitation mm (inches)	45.0 (1.77)	37.1 (1.46)	41.7 (1.64)	67.1 (2.64)	63.6 (2.50)	53.0 (2.09)	34.3 (1.35)	55.8 (2.20)	79.1 (3.11)	84.2 (3.31)	73.0 (2.87)	61.0 (2.40)	694.9 (27.36)
Average precipitation days (≥ 1 mm)	5.2	4.6	5.2	8.0	7.5	5.9	4.1	4.6	5.8	7.6	6.4	6.4	71.3
Mean monthly sunshine hours	170	187	232	225	260	302	343	310	247	191	159	148	2,774
Source: Meteorological data for Saint Auban – 461m altitude, from 1981 to 2010 January 2015 (in French)

== Demographics ==
Historical population

Year	Pop.	±% p.a.
1801	133,966	—
1821	145,115	+0.40%
1831	155,896	+0.72%
1841	156,055	+0.01%
1851	152,070	−0.26%
1861	146,368	−0.38%
1872	139,332	−0.45%
1881	131,918	−0.61%
1891	124,285	−0.59%
1901	115,021	−0.77%
1911	107,232	−0.70%
1921	91,882	−1.53%
1931	87,893	−0.44%

Year	Pop.	±% p.a.
1936	85,090	−0.65%
1946	83,354	−0.21%
1954	84,335	+0.15%
1962	91,843	+1.07%
1968	104,813	+2.23%
1975	112,178	+0.97%
1982	119,068	+0.86%
1990	130,883	+1.19%
1999	139,561	+0.72%
2007	156,067	+1.41%
2012	161,241	+0.65%
2017	163,915	+0.33%
2023	168,054	+0.42%

The population was once fairly evenly distributed in the territory, including in the mountainous areas where mountain agriculture was well developed. From the middle of the 19th century, however, it began to decline due to a strong rural exodus. There were more than 150,000 inhabitants in 1850 but it fell to less than 100,000 after the First World War. It was not until 1960 that the trend changed upwards quite strongly from less than 90,000 in 1954 to nearly 140,000 in 1999 and 168,054 in 2023 (population density 24 inhabitants/km^{2}). However, if this figure is close to the number of inhabitants the department had 150 years earlier, the distribution and activity of the population are very different. The population is now concentrated in the valley of the Durance and the South West of the department, and agriculture employs less than ever before. Services, mainly tourism and local services, is now the main industry.

The population of the department is sightly similar to Guam.

The department has never really developed: in 1870 there were 27 small mines (one lead, four oil shale and 22 lignite).

=== A departmental resort ===
According to the general census of the population, 32.8% of available housing in the department are second homes.

=== A very dense and very uneven settlement ===
The department of Alpes-de-Haute-Provence is one of the least densely populated of France with barely more than 20 inhabitants per km^{2}. The population is concentrated mainly in the valleys of the Durance, the Bléone (up to Digne) and the nearby flat lands. The rest of the department is sparsely populated (less than 10 inhabitants per km^{2} over most of the territory).

82 (41%) of the communes have less than 200 inhabitants, 7 communes have less than 50 and many villages have been abandoned. The towns are small: only Digne-les-Bains and Manosque approach or exceed 20,000 people. The arrondissement of Barcelonnette is the least populated arrondissement in France and the only one in France with less than 10,000 inhabitants. The city of Castellane is the smallest sub-prefecture in France.

Among the 15 cantons in the department, 5 have a resident population of less than 10,000 inhabitants: Barcelonnette, Castellane, Riez, Seyne, and Valensole.

The ten most populous communes are:

Commune	Population (2023)
Manosque	22,718
Digne-les-Bains	17,979
Sisteron	7,850
Oraison	6,155
Forcalquier	5,222
Château-Arnoux-Saint-Auban	5,107
Villeneuve	4,360
Les Mées	4,099
Pierrevert	3,945
Sainte-Tulle	3,558

In contrast, the three communes with less than 20 inhabitants in 2023 were Archail (14 inhabitants), Saint-Martin-lès-Seyne (7 inh.) and Majastres (5 inh.).

== History ==
Basses-Alpes was one of the 83 original departments created during the French Revolution on 4 March 1790 under the Act of 22 December 1789.

On 12 August 1793, the department of Vaucluse was created from parts of the departments of Bouches-du-Rhône, Drôme, and Basses-Alpes. Basses-Alpes lost the canton of Sault to Vaucluse at this point. Seventeen years later, in 1810, the canton of Barcillonnette was transferred over to Hautes-Alpes.

The department of Basses-Alpes was occupied by fascist Italy from November 1942 to September 1943.

On 13 April 1970, the department of Basses-Alpes was renamed to Alpes-de-Haute-Provence.

Here is an unflattering excerpt from an article called "Basse Alpes" from the Atlas Larousse published at the beginning of the 20th century:

"Scattered whitish rocks stand out like bones, a thin topsoil where bushes languish, some mountain flowers and stunted trees ... these mountains form almost everywhere a dreadful desert which will not have more inhabitants: this is the Sahara without the sun of Africa, with the snows of Siberia." (P. Joanne).

"On these steep slopes deforestation and flooding have resulted in a lack of fertile soil and agriculture has been the most miserable. There is a small harvest of wheat, wine in small quantities (but good), and truffles in large numbers. In the southern part, which has the climate of Provence, there are olive trees, mulberry trees, and orange trees. Aromatic plants abound, and there are 250,000 beehives. Manosque because its location is by far the second largest city of the department (with 5,500 inhabitants). Near Manosque are the lignite and gypsum mines. Despite a fairly active trade in olive oil, wine and raw silk, this department is also one of the least populated." (Larousse Illustrated Atlas, Printing Larousse, Paris, 1900).

=== Heraldry ===
Arms of Alpes-de-Haute-Provence	Blazon: Azure, a fleur de lys of Or surmounted by a Label of three points gules all over a terrace in base argent indented of three points.

== Administrative division ==
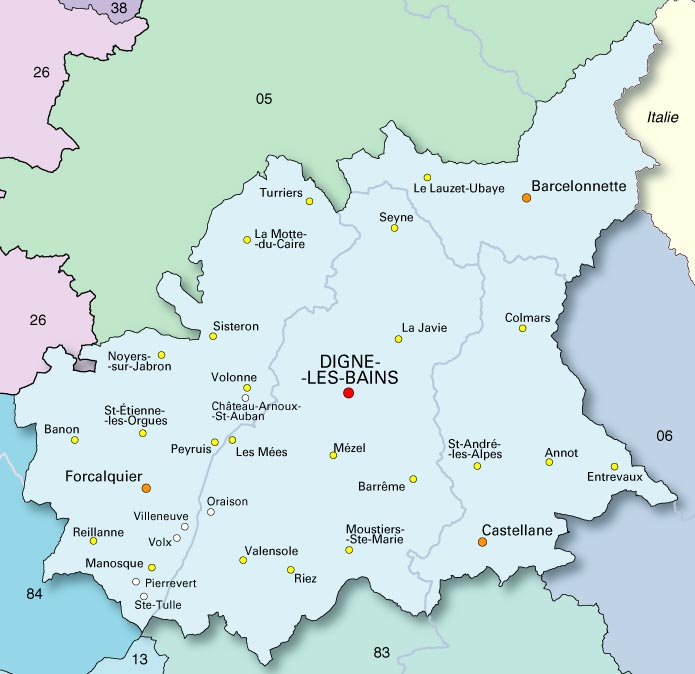
Map of the Alpes-de-Haute-Provence department

Alpes-de-Haute-Provence is subdivided into 4 arrondissements, 15 cantons and 198 communes.

Arrondissement	# of communes
Barcelonnette	14
Castellane	41
Digne-les-Bains	46
Forcalquier	97

=== Ancient communes and changes to the administrative divisions of the communes ===
The rural exodus of the 19th and 20th centuries has had a significant impact on the population of towns: some were completely or almost completely abandoned by their inhabitants which led to the disappearance of fifty communes since the creation of the department. Some villages still exist and sometimes gave their name to a new commune created by mergers (e.g. La Mure-Argens) and others are nothing more than a pile of stones (like Levens in the commune of Majastres). They are sometimes listed on maps (e.g. Bédejun in the commune of Chaudon-Norante). At its formation, the department had 270 communes (262 after changing the limits of the department) but it is now 198. Apart from eight communes which were attached either to Hautes-Alpes (the three communes of the Barcillonnette canton, or to Vaucluse (the canton of Sault) many communes have disappeared.

In 1854, the state of communes in the department was as follows:

- Arrondissement of Barcelonnette: 20 communes, 4 cantons
- Arrondissement of Castellane: 48 communes, 6 cantons
- Arrondissement of Digne-les-Bains: 87 communes, 9 cantons
- Arrondissement of Forcalquier: 51 communes, 6 cantons
- Arrondissement of Sisteron (former): 50 communes, 5 cantons

in total 256 towns and 30 townships.

Special cases of mergers and changes in municipal boundaries

- some communes have chosen a name without historical connection, e.g. Val-de-Chalvagne formed by the merger of three communes (Castellet-Saint-Cassian, Montblanc and Villevieille)
- some communes have absorbed a large number of others – such was the case of Digne and Castellane with seven towns merged: Villars-Brandis, Taloire, Eoulx, Taulane, Chasteuil, and Castillon when creating the namesake

Also some other noteworthy atypical cases:

- merger then separation: Archail and Draix then split between Saint-Martin-les-Eaux and Manosque
- merger with one commune then another: Aurent (merged with Braux then Castellet-lès-Sausses)
- a first merger of two communes followed by a merger with another commune: Peyresq with La Colle-Saint-Michel (under the name of Saint-Michel-Peyresq), the new entity was then merged with Thorame-Haute
- merged communes but not adjacent: Le Poil merged with Senez.

There are still some cases of communal associations since 1973 (some have also gone more or less quickly in favour of a "simple aggregation"). For example, La Mure-Argens with Argens enjoying this status (with the Mayor delegated specifically for Argens, a city hall annex and an electoral district).

=== Politics ===
==== Departmental Council of Alpes-de-Haute-Provence ====
In the 2021 departmental election, the Departmental Council of Alpes-de-Haute-Provence was elected as follows:

Party	Seats
The Republicans	20
Miscellaneous left	4
French Communist Party	2
Miscellaneous centre	2
Socialist Party	2

The department has an electoral tradition markedly old left. There are strong republican traditions such as the number of Political clubs during the French Revolution and the resistance to the coup of Napoleon III in 1851. The tradition of the left is also manifested in rural areas since all cantons devoted to agriculture very early showed an inclination to vote for Republican candidates. The installation of the large chemical plant at Saint-Auban also had a favorable effect on the vote for the left (see below) and has been a breeding ground for the political organization of the left in the department by the trade union movement. The power station at Sainte-Tulle also supplied many activists to leftist organizations.

Exceptions in the department: the alpine areas of Barcelonnette and the upper valley of the Verdon, both territories of emigration but also with a garrison of Chasseurs Alpins in the first. These areas, deeply Catholic, have long opted for elected conservatives – one of the most famous being the former Minister of the Third Republic, Paul Reynaud. A definition of the political choices of the county population is often translated as: the higher the altitude rises, the more the popular vote looks to the right.

Since the end of the First World War the department has been most often depicted, both by the Senate and the National Assembly, as an electoral issue of either the PCF or, especially, the socialist movement – the SFIO or the PS, or by the radical left.

A landmark of the Resistance during the Second World War, at Liberation the department deeply changed is roots to the left, a change that has not really been challenged since. A change, which may be temporary however, was recorded in 2007 when, for the first time in local political history, a right-wing deputy elected in the previous election (in 2002) was re-elected to the National Assembly. The other seat is occupied by the President of the Departmental Council, Jean-Louis Bianco, a former minister with François Mitterrand. In the Senate, the department is represented by Claude Domeizel, a former Socialist Mayor of Volx.

François Mitterrand won the majority of votes of the inhabitants of the department in 1974, 1981, and 1988 although in the last two cases it was 53% of the vote. In 1995, Jacques Chirac was leading the second round of the presidential election with just over 52% but less than the national score. In 2002 it was Jean Marie Le Pen who topped the first round. Finally, in 2007, Nicolas Sarkozy, who reached the top in the first round, with nearly 30% of the votes, gained 53.2% in the second round.

In European referendums, the department has voted "No" during the consultation on the Maastricht Treaty at 51.6% (majority of 2238 votes) and "No" during the consultation on the European Constitutional Treaty at 60.3% (majority 16,575 votes).

==== Members of the National Assembly ====
Constituency	Member	Party
Alpes-de-Haute-Provence's 1st constituency	Christian Girard	National Rally
Alpes-de-Haute-Provence's 2nd constituency	Sophie Vaginay-Ricourt	National Rally

== Economy ==
The department has, by its own characteristics (mountainous and low population), a character marked by a relatively weak industrial base and a move towards the creation of jobs in the areas of trades and services.

Thus, according to the survey on labour needs by ASSEDIC, most of the jobs available are now from the professions of sociocultural and sports activities (1031 offers listed out of 4752 total in the department), hotel (968 offers), cleaning (438 offers), catering (345 offers).

Of all these offers at least three-quarters were for seasonal jobs.

However, significant changes in the sociological situation of the department are to be expected from the implementation of the ITER project at the mouth of the Durance valley.

=== Primary sector ===
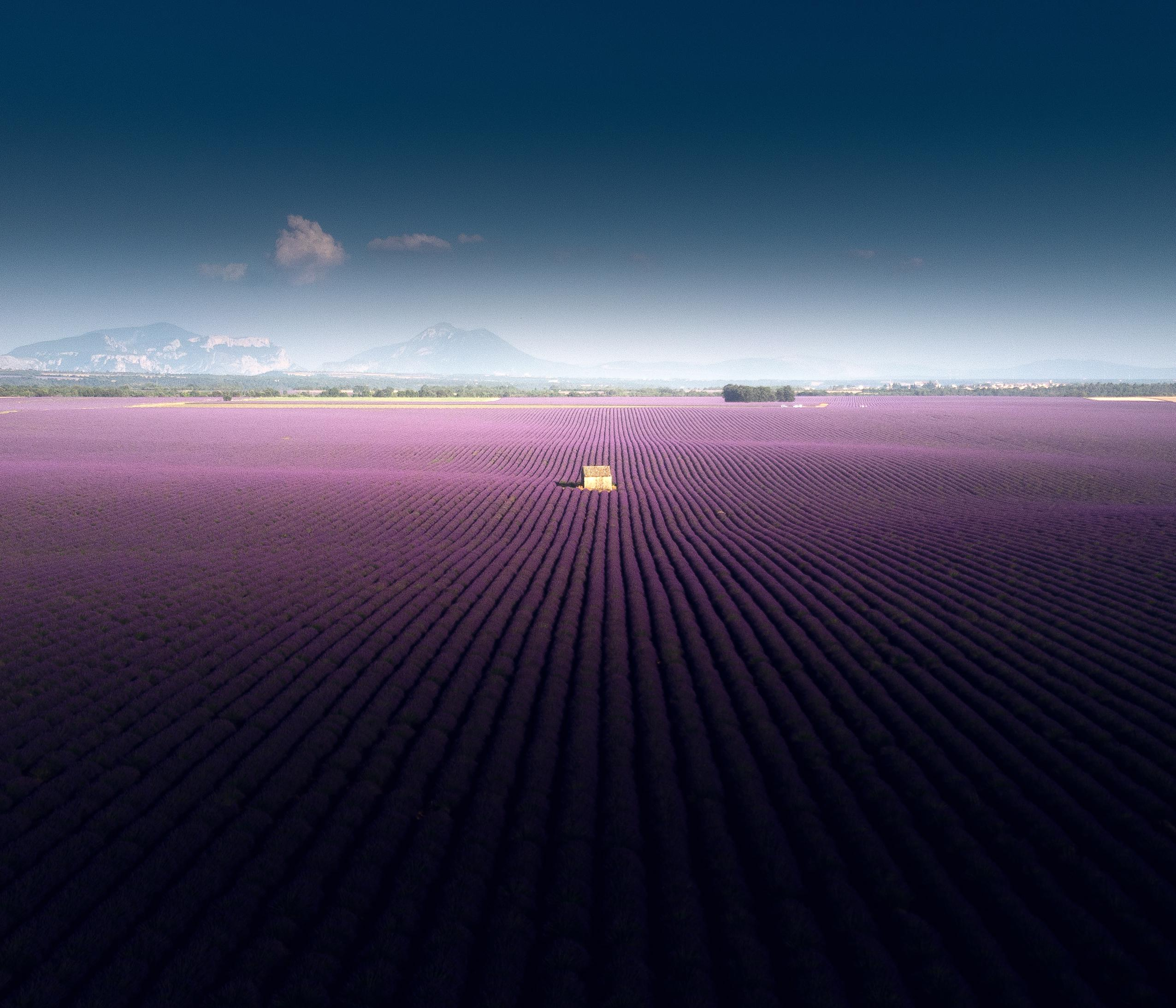
Lavender fields in Valensole

In the Alpes-de-Haute-Provence department agriculture has had a very important place in the economy but the food-producing polyculture has given way to a much more specialized agriculture oriented around fruit, cereals and high value added products (honey, perfumes, and essential oils, cosmetics, olives, and wine).

The cultivated species are temperate species, especially those at higher altitude, and Mediterranean species at low altitude. The production is of a wide variety. In recent years, an increase in the cultivation of lavender has emerged, particularly in the area of Saint-André-les-Alpes.

The utilised agricultural area is 165,809 hectares mostly devoted to farming activities such as grass meadows for over 96,000 hectares.

According to the agricultural census of 2000, the department has 2,947 farms, more than the 1,500 farms under the previous census carried out twelve years previously. The average farm size has increased from 32 to 56 hectares.

This is an area of arboriculture particularly along the Durance, which is the main farming area in terms of number of farms (829 in total).

It is followed by the crop sector (mostly grain) with 740 farms with the rest in the livestock sector.

One of the characteristics of the department is that there are 614 farms devoted to breeding animals other than cattle. These are for the breeding of sheep and goats, including the production of milk used for cheese making under Appellation d'origine contrôlée (AOC) for Banon cheese.

The winemakers of Pierrevert also have an appellation d'origine contrôlée (AOC) ranking for their production.

The Alpes de Hautes-Provence department is a region where 49.1% of the area is forested or 343,691 hectares, with an average rate of 39.4% for the Provence-Alpes-Côte d'Azur region. The National Office of Forests (ONF) manages 86,000 hectares. The main species exploited are Scots pine, black pine, larch, pubescent oak (or white oak), and beech. Fir and spruce are less common. The 2003 heat wave caused the decline of many species of trees, consequently accelerating the return of Mediterranean oaks, alders and linden.

=== Industry ===
Industry is relatively small in terms of business establishments but has several relatively large companies.

At the end of 2004 the department had 937 establishments with 17 exceeding fifty employees.

This is particularly the case of the historic plant at Saint-Auban (the Arkema factory formerly Elf-Atochem), the Sanofi of Sisteron factory (north of Saint-Auban), and Manosque (L'Occitane factory). Some more specialized factories (olive oil, perfumes, wines) produce products with high added value.

At the end of 2006, according to ASSEDIC data, the industrial sector employed 4,261 employees in the department, or a little over 14% of private sector employees.

In the Chemistry sub-sector there are 1,761 employees and agribusiness has 1,205 employees: these are the two main divisions.

The chemical sector includes segments of: pharmacy (Sanofi factory, cited above, with more than 650 employees), basic chemistry (Arkema factory, with more than 500 employees), and cosmetics with more than 450 people.

The industrial sector has lost nearly 400 jobs since 2001 particularly from downsizing at Arkema and despite the good financial health of Total S.A. which owns it. This may change with the implementation of the International Thermonuclear Experimental Reactor (ITER).

The Building sector and public works account for 1,387 active establishments with more than half (758) institutions without any employees (artisans established their behalf). In late 2006, the sector employed more than 3,900 employees including nearly 1,500 in the public works sector particularly driven by the completion of major infrastructure (motorway A51 and others).

=== Tertiary ===
After the depopulation caused by the rural exodus, the department pioneered agritourism in the 1950s although it is no longer the leader in France in this field. Approximately 120 farms offer tourist activities (accommodation, catering or leisure), with 70 certified.

The tertiary sector includes very different enterprises.

Commercial activities have undergone considerable change, and had in 2004 2,473 establishments but with 1,396 (over 56%) with no employees.

In late 2006, however, this sector employed 6,478 people in more than 1,000 establishments. Employee headcounts have risen sharply since 2001 as there have been a total of 627 additional jobs (more than 10% of the workforce) since that date.

The number of employees is about 22% of the workforce employed in the private sector.

This has resulted from the development, particularly in the cities of Manosque and Digne, of major retail shopping areas. Nearly 1,600 employees in the services sector are employed there.

Service activities cover a total of 7,322 institutions in late 2004 with 4,323 (over 59%) with no employees.

It is this sector, however which has the largest number of establishments with more than 50 employees – 96 establishments.

At the end of 2006, this sector employed, among others, 1,141 employees in the transport sector, 3,425 employees in business services, and more than 4,000 in the field of services to individuals.

These sectors are evolving and increasing their activities.

The positive migration flow for the department often originates from the arrival of retired households, due in particular to the significant increase in numbers of elderly and home care services.

The transport sector created sixty additional jobs but it was especially the service sector enterprises and service to individuals (e.g. health and social activity) experienced a dramatic and significant growth.

The health sector has substantially increased its importance in the economy with over a thousand more jobs, especially in the segments of short-term care-giving and maintenance, with nearly 850 related jobs.

This is largely explained by the fact that the major industrial companies in the department, such as companies in the construction sector, use temporary workers, instead of hiring full-time.

In Château-Arnoux-Saint-Auban, the reduction in industrial jobs (160 jobs lost on the Arkema work site) is partially offset by the increase in temporary employment (100 additional jobs ).

Similarly, in Manosque, the first city of the department in terms of employment, and sustainable development (2,000 more jobs in five years), the increase in temporary jobs has been spectacular – reaching 400 jobs. These jobs are in, among other things, the cosmetics industry, the construction industry and public works, and retail. Large retail chains in the city prefer this mode of hiring to permanent staff.

In the field of health and social activities, there has been significant job creation also with 760 more jobs, bringing to 13% the share of employees in the sector in terms of total private employment. This increase is particularly in hospitality and accommodation with nearly a thousand employees, an increase of about 150 jobs since 2001, while the area of home care now employs 741 employees instead of 457 five years earlier.

Finally, note that voluntary work, with nearly 1,000 jobs offered, is also present in the department.

== Tourism ==
The area's scenery provides the background to many activities and sights. Eleven villages have been classified as having special architectural character, including:

- The town of Manosque, known for the birthplace and home of famed Provençal writer Jean Giono
- The town of Sisteron, with its ancient citadel and narrow streets
- The Verdon Gorge, dubbed Europe's Grand Canyon
- Digne-les-Bains, a hot-spa town
- Moustiers-Sainte-Marie, known for its pottery
- Forcalquier Cathedral

In summer many aerial sports use the surrounding mountains such as gliding, hang gliding and paragliding. In winter there is extensive skiing at eleven ski resorts.

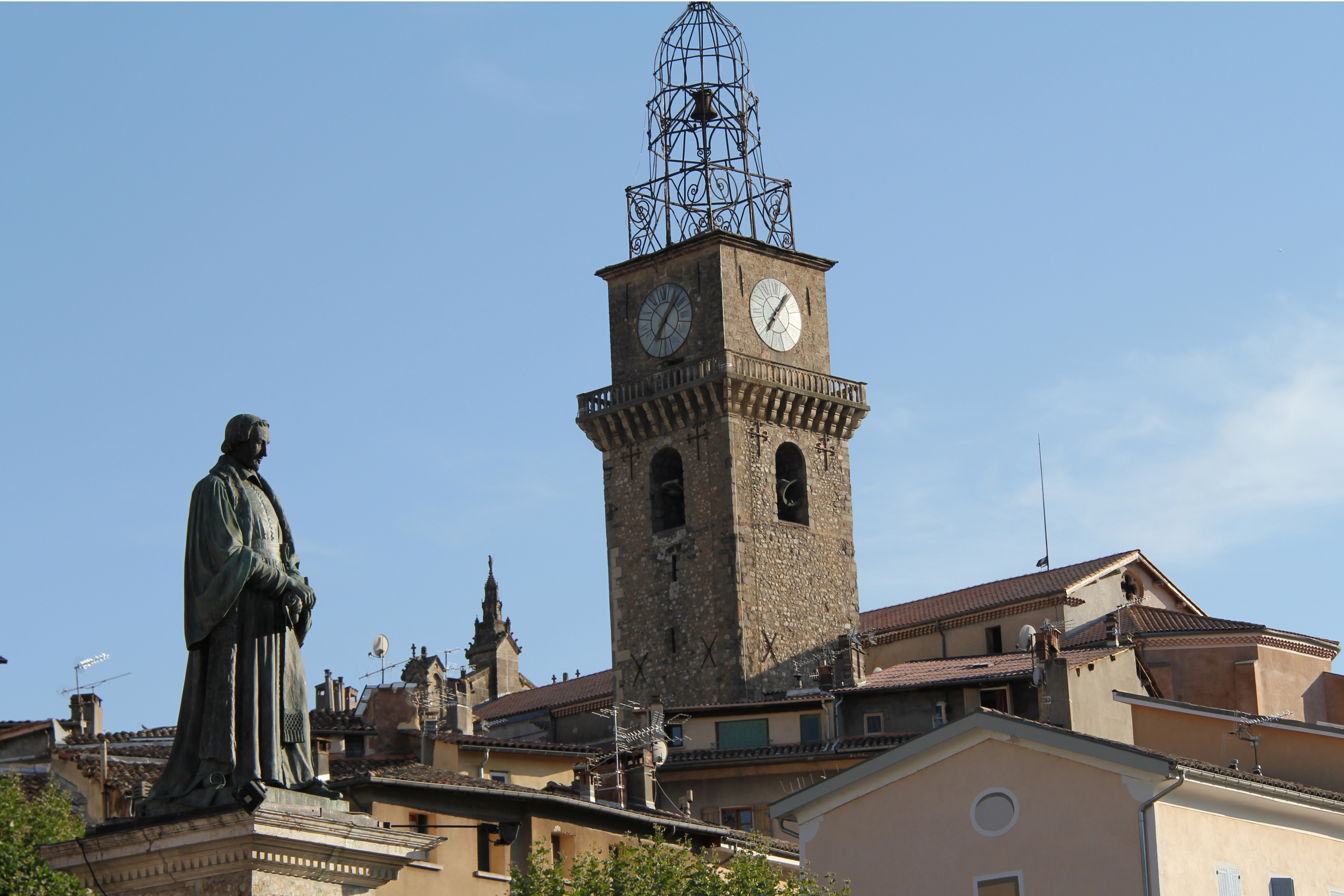
Digne-les-Bains, The prefecture of the Alpes-de-Haute-Provence department

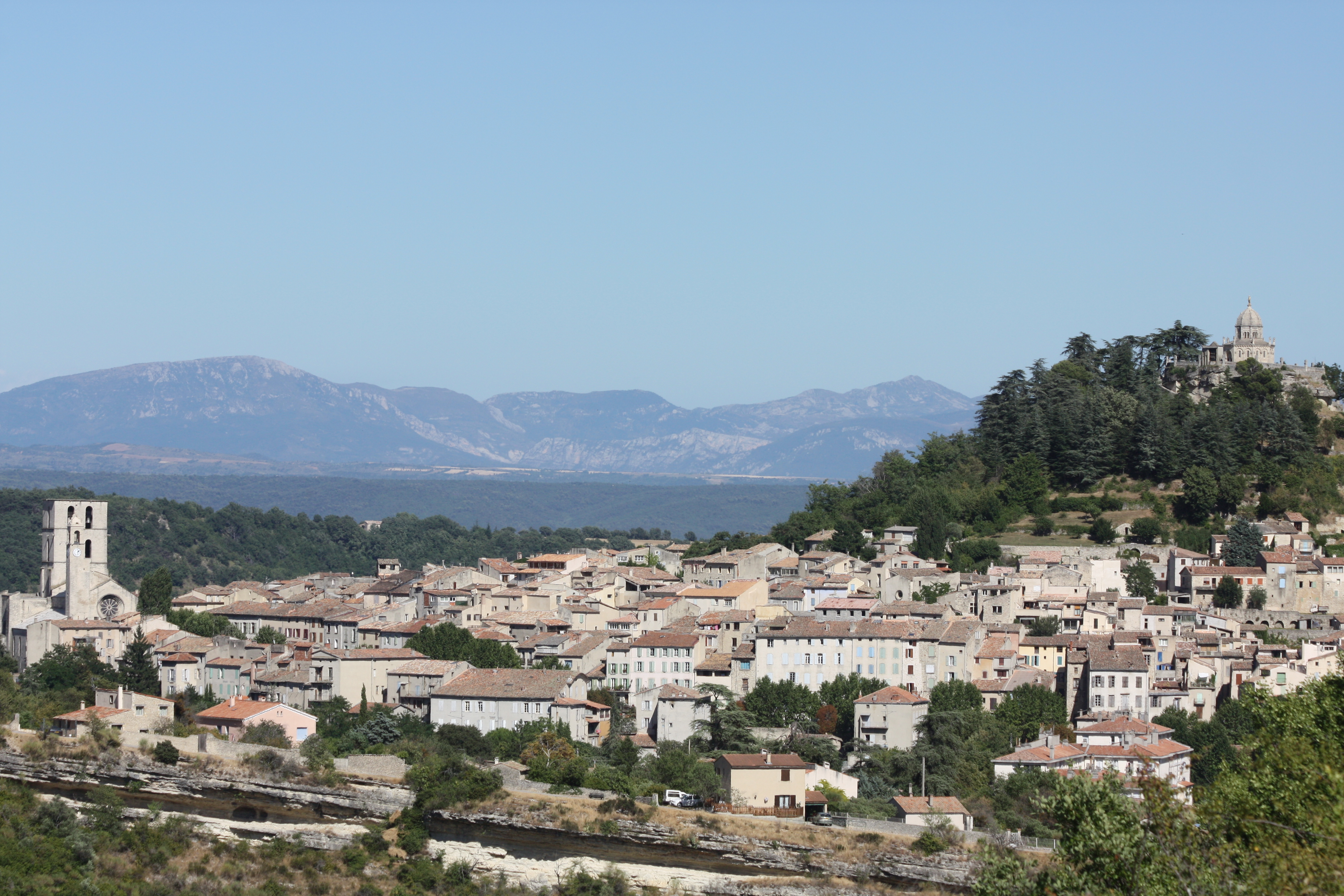
Forcalquier

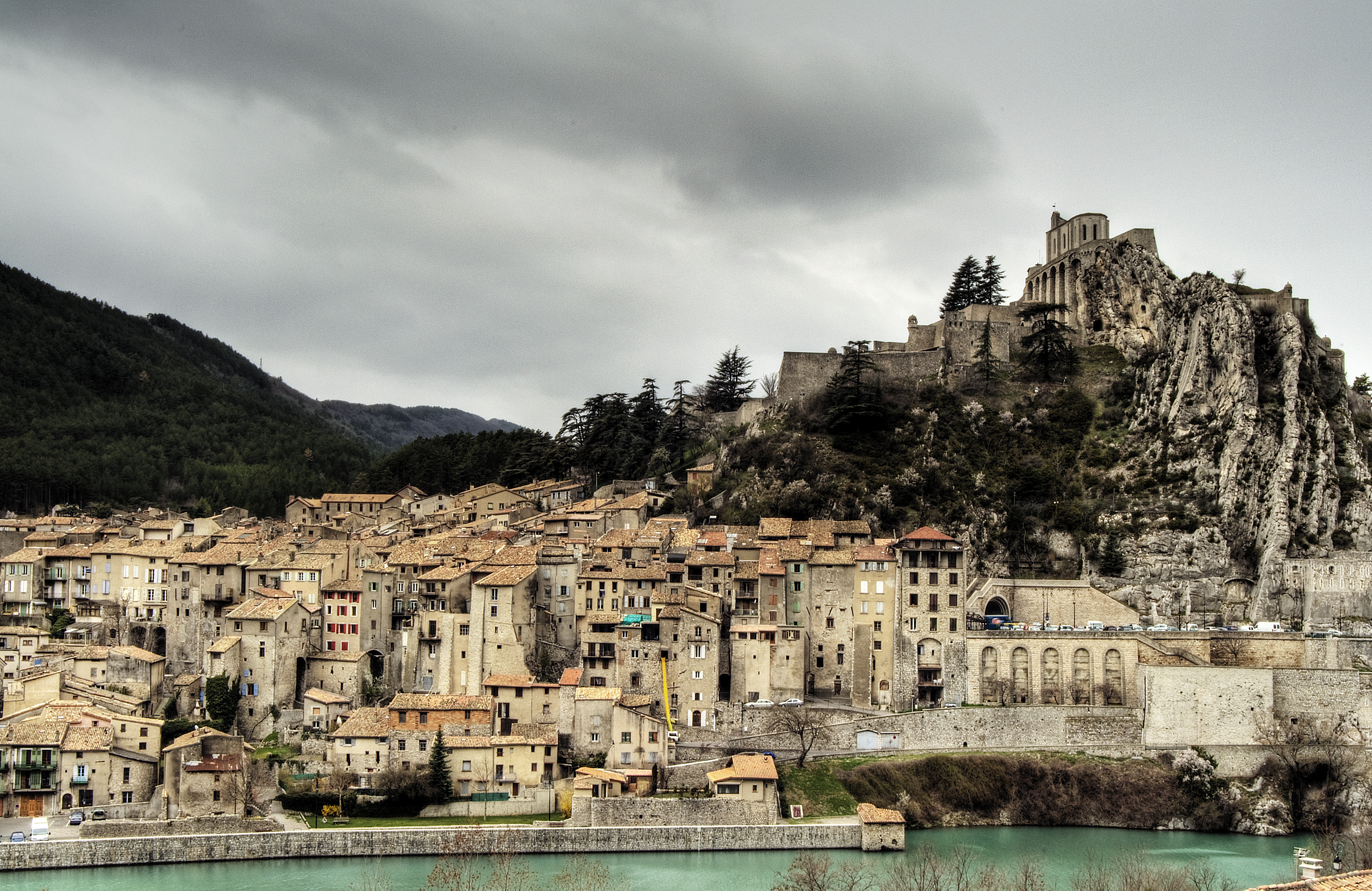
Sisteron

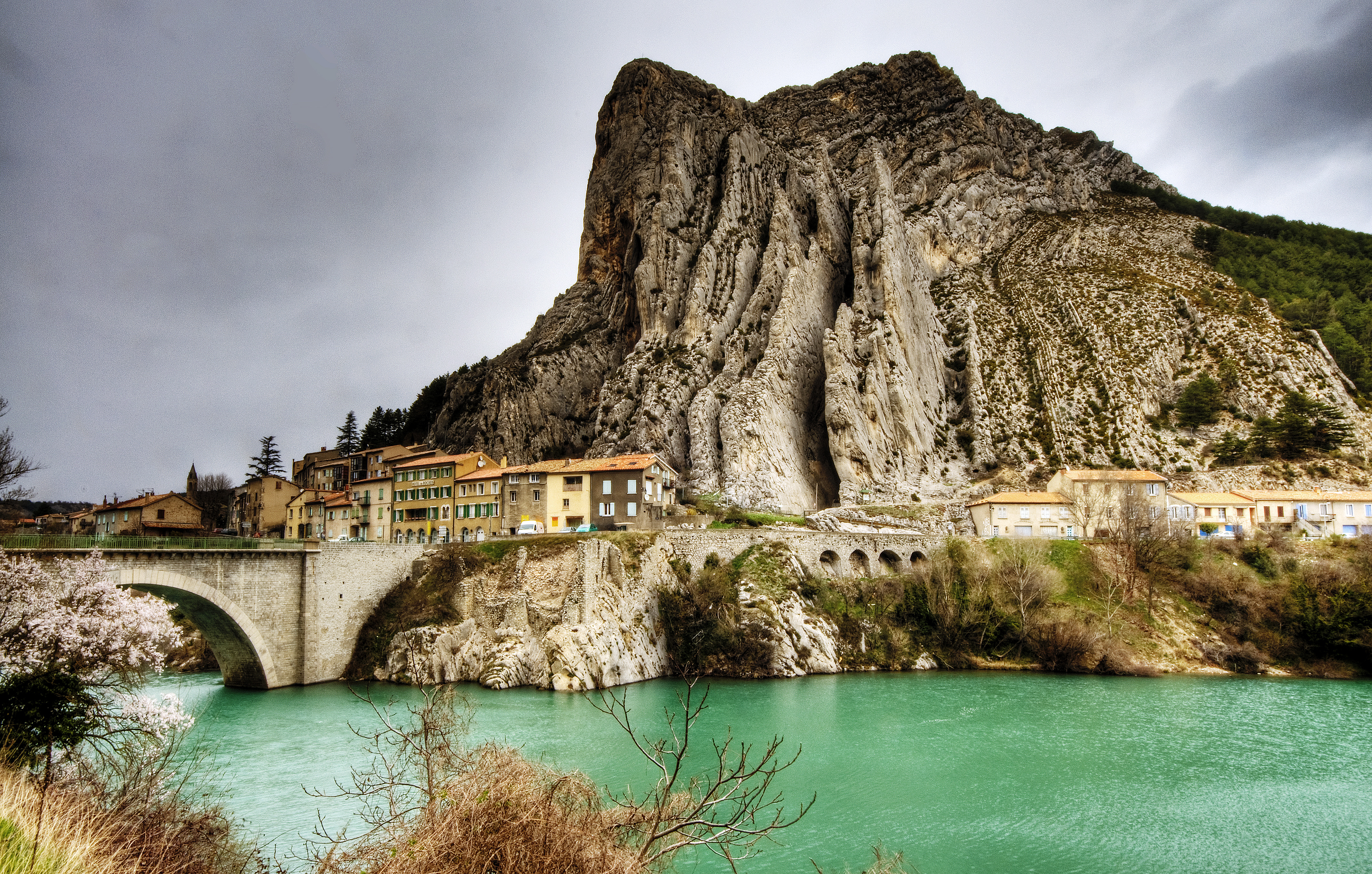
Rocher de La Baume

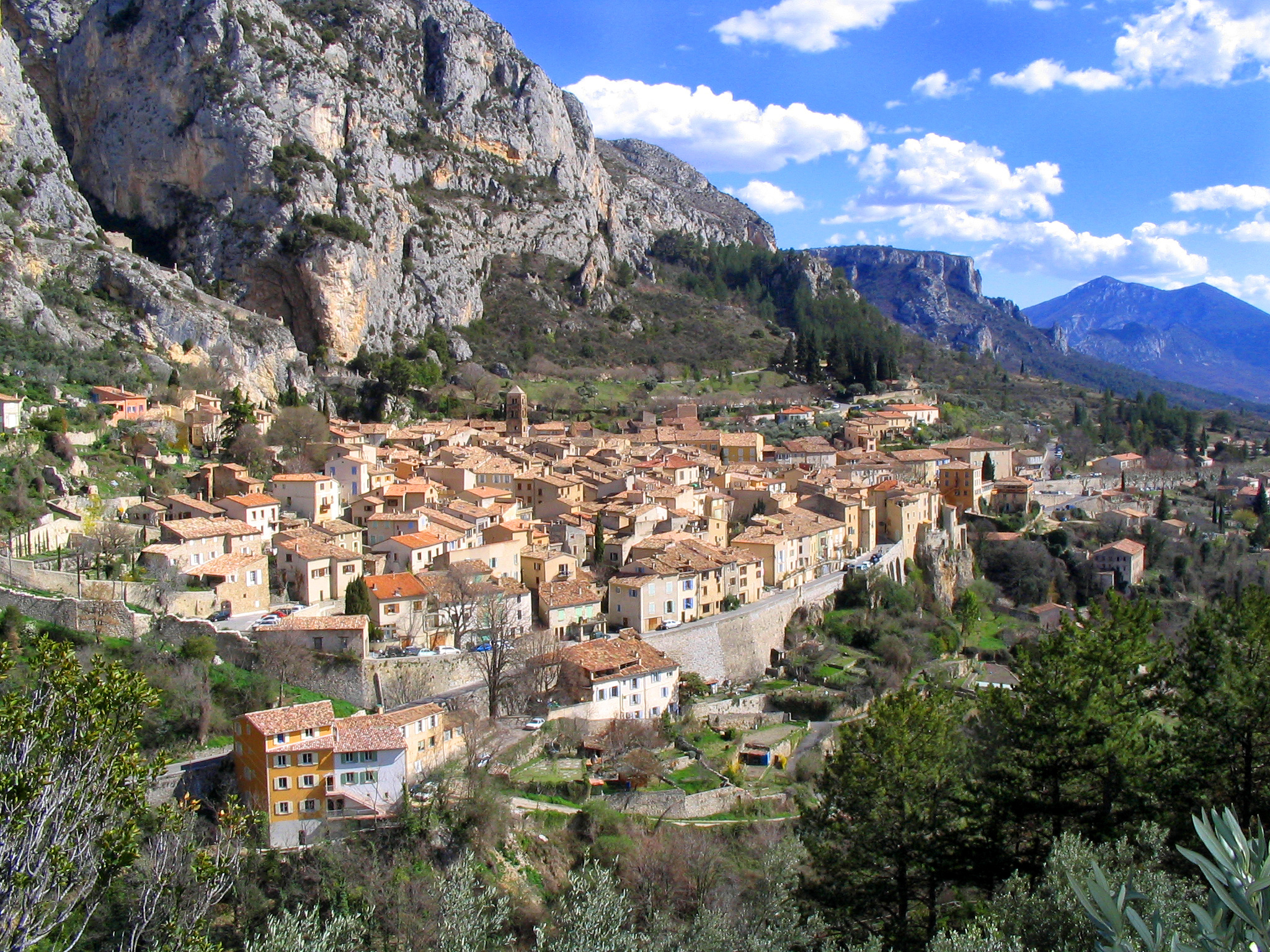
Moustiers-Sainte-Marie

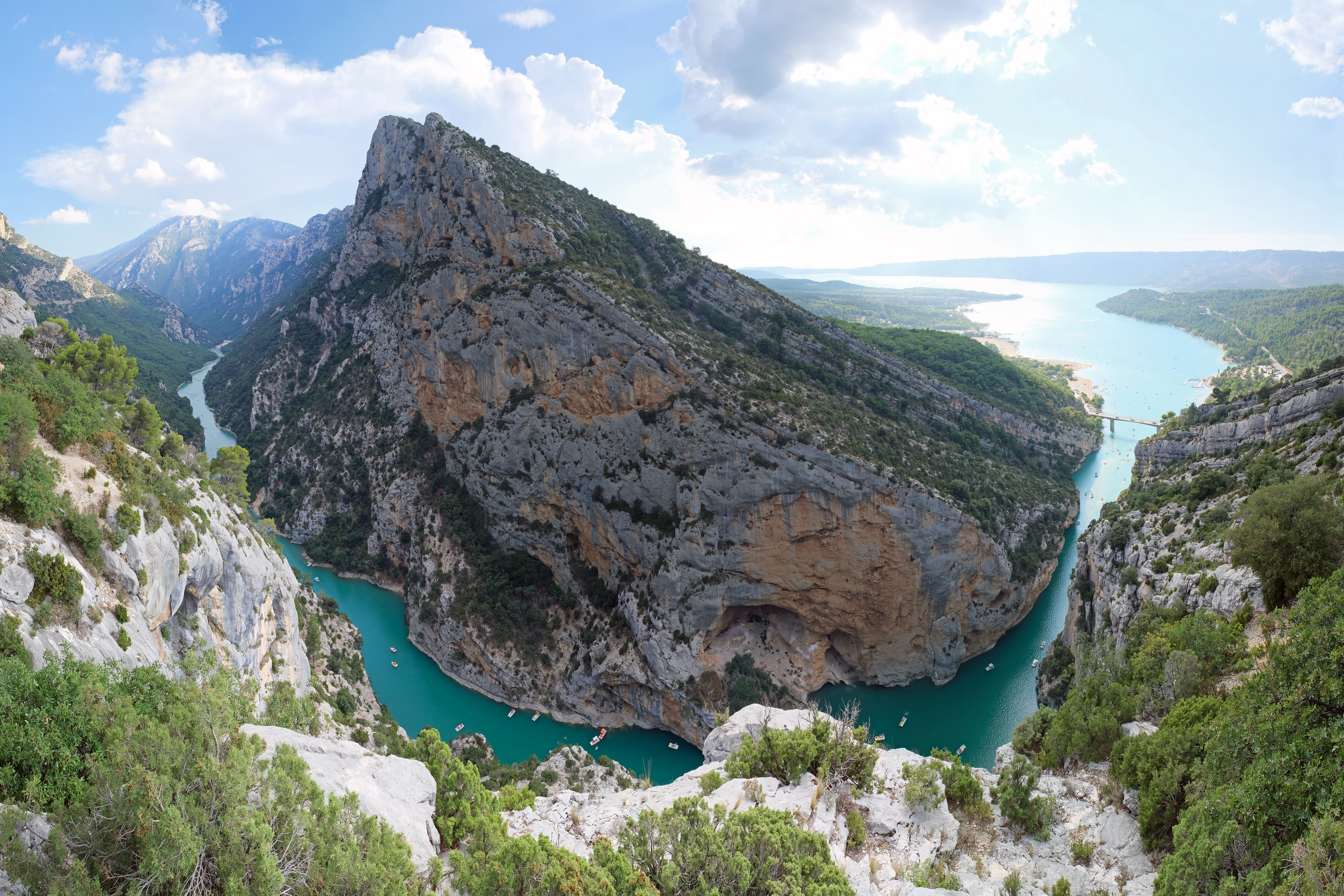
Verdon Gorge

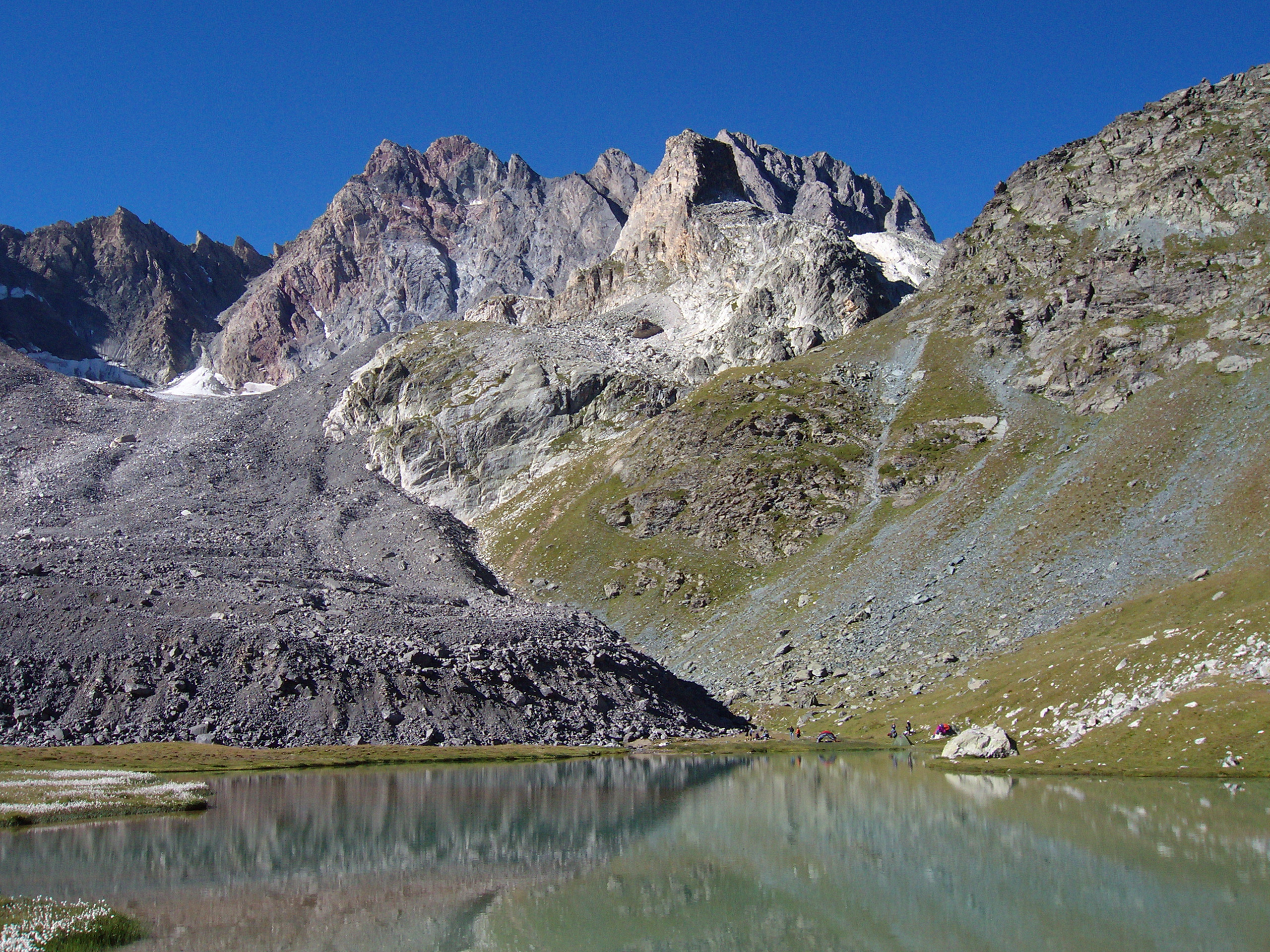
The Aiguille de Chambeyron and the Marinet Lake in the Ubaye Valley

=== Gastronomy ===
Famous dishes from the commune:

- Les tomates à la Provençale from Manosque
- Black Pudding traditionally cooked with leeks
- Scrambled eggs with truffles from Riez
- Pattes a la main de Fours
- Sisteron Lamb
- Pierrevert wine (AOC since 1997)
- Lavender Honey
- Banon cheese
- Génépi from the Ubaye Valley
- Pieds paquets from Sisteron
- Henri Bardouin de Forcalquier Liqueurs.

== Local media ==
=== Print Media ===
Daily newspapers: La Provence, le Dauphine Libere, and La Marseillaise. All three have a local edition.

Weekly Newspaper: Haute Provence info

Free Newspapers: J'y Vais Provence, a bimonthly journal. Cultural information and portraits of artists of the department.

=== Local radio ===
- Alpes 1 (based at Gap, Hautes-Alpes), transmits to the regions of Digne-les-Bains, Sisteron, Barcelonnette and Allos
- Durance FM (based at Reillane), transmits in the regions of Manosque, Digne-les-Bains, and Sisteron
- Fréquence Mistral (based in Manosque), transmits in the regions of Manosque, Digne-les-Bains, Sisteron, and Castellane
- Grimaldi FM (based in Puget-Théniers (Alpes-Maritimes)) transmits to the cantons of Annot and Entrevaux
- Là la radio (based at Gap (Hautes-Alpes)) transmits to the regions of Allos, Barcelonnette, and Colmars-les-Alpes
- Radio Oxygène (based in Fréjus (Var)), transmits in the regions of Barcelonnette and Val d'Allos;
- Radio Star (based in Marseille (Bouches-du-Rhône)), transmits in the regions of Manosque, Digne-les-Bains, and Sisteron
- Radio Verdon (based in Saint-Julien-le-Montagnier (Var)), transmits to the regions of Manosque and Castellane
- Radio Zinzine (based at Limans), funded by the Longo Maï cooperative, transmits to the areas of Manosque, Digne-les-Bains, Sisteron, and Forcalquier.

=== Local TV ===
- Télévision Locale Provence (TLP) is available through TNT channel 30 in the area of Manosque and Val de Durance, by satellite in the FRANSAT package, by Internet on ADSL Orange, SFR/Neuf, Numéricâble in Avignon and its region (soon to be Free) Verdon Info: Information on the area Pays Asses-Verdon-Vaïre-Var (Arrondissement of Castellane).

== Infrastructure ==
=== Road network ===
Many roads in Alpes-de-Haute-Provence are narrow and winding due to terrain. These natural conditions make access to certain parts of the department rather difficult, especially in winter, and particularly the communes in the Arrondissements of Barcelonnette and Castellane. They are therefore quite isolated from the rest of the department and the region.

National Highway N85 between Digne-les-Bains and Castellane passes through several narrow gorges including that of Taulanne which is especially narrow.

=== Rail network ===
There are several railway lines in Alpes de Haute-Provence. These are:

- the Chemins de Fer de Provence line (known as the Train des pignes) from Nice – Digne
- two lines of the SNCF:
  - the Lyon-Perrache – Marseille-Saint-Charles (via Grenoble) line
  - the Saint-Auban – Digne line (service provided by coaches) is now abandoned. It formed the junction between the Train des Pignes and the Lyon-Marseille lines. A project to reopen the line is being studied and included in the planning between the State and Region.

Old abandoned lines:

- the Volx – Forcalquier line
- the Volx – Cavaillon line
- the Chorges – Barcelonnette line (never opened)

== Notable people ==
=== Scientists ===
- Pierre Gassendi (1592 at Champtercier – 1655), mathematician, philosopher, theologian and astronomer.
- Jean Solome (1674–1752), historian from Moustiers-Sainte-Marie
- Prior Laurensi (1719–1808), historian.
- Jean Marc Gaspard Itard (1774 at Oraison – 1838), a famous doctor for his work on the case of the Feral child, Victor of Aveyron, and pioneer of the ear, nose and throat speciality
- Jean Aimé Édouard de Laplane (1774–1870), historian from Sisteron
- Simon-Jude Honnorat (1783 at Allos – 1852), physician, naturalist, regional linguist
- Elzéard Gras-Bourget (1788–1860) Judge and historian
- Father Jean-Joseph-Maxime Feraud (1810 at Riez – 1897), historian
- Alphonse Eugene Beau called Beau de Rochas (1815 at Digne-les-Bains – 1893) thermodynamics engineer, inventor of the four-stroke engine, and turbine engine
- Pierre-Gilles de Gennes (1932–2007), Nobel prize in physics in 1991. Spent his childhood in Barcelonnette

=== Artists ===
Painters

- Eugene Martel (1869 at Revest-du-Bion – 1947)
- Raoul Dufy (1877–1953 at Forcalquier)
- Serge Fiorio (1911–2011), born in Switzerland, died at Viens, Vaucluse, he settled in the Alpes-de-Haute-Provence in 1947
- Paul Martin (1830–1903) and his son Étienne Martin (1856–1945). Naturalist painters and botanists

Singers / Musicians

- Albertet de Sisteron (1194–1221), troubadour
- Damien Saez (1977– )

Others

- Joseph Olérys, Faiencer of the 18th century
- Bernar Venet (1941 at Château-Arnoux-Saint-Auban), visual artist

Fictional Characters

- Elzéard Bouffier, the shepherd in The Man Who Planted Trees by Jean Giono

=== Other historical figures ===
Military

- Joseph de Richery (1757 at Allons – 1798 at Eoulx) Rear Admiral who distinguished himself during the wars of the Revolution
- Pierre Charles Silvestre de Villeneuve (1763 at Valensole – 1806), admiral of the French fleet at the Battle of Trafalgar
- Louis Alexis Desmichels (1779 at Digne – 1845), an officer of the First Empire, General
- Paul Touvier (1915 at Saint-Vincent-sur-Jabron – 1996), leader of the Milice in Lyon, the first Frenchman condemned for crimes against humanity
- Bruno Dary (1952 at Barcelonnette – ), Military governor of Paris

Political and financial

- Jacques-Antoine Manuel (1775 at Barcelonnette – 1827), fourth deputy (MP) under the Bourbon Restoration
- Hippolyte Fourtoul (1811 Digne – 1856), Minister of Education under the Second Empire
- The Brothers Arnaud originators of the Ubayens emigration movement to Mexico and Louisiana in the 19th and early 20th century
- André Honnorat (1868–1950), originally from Allos and Barcelonnette, Minister of Public Education and Fine Arts in 1920
- Paul Reynaud (1878 at Barcelonnette – 1966), former President of the Council of Ministers (1940)
- Henri Laugier (1888 at Mane – 1973), Deputy Secretary General of the UN
- Jean-Louis Bianco (1943 – ), deputy for Alpes-de-Haute-Provence and president of the department's general council

=== Sports ===
Motor Sports

- Jean-Michel Bayle (1969 at Manosque – ) motocross champion
- Mickael Maschio (1973 at Digne – ), French motocross driver

Footballers

- René Gallice (1919 at Forcalquier – 1999), former professional soccer player
- Alain Boghossian (1970 at Digne – ), former professional soccer player, world champion in 1998, assistant coach of the French football team since 2008.

Skiers

- Honoré Bonnet (1919–2005) coach of the French ski team at the 1968 Winter Olympics
- Carole Merle (1964 at Sauze), the most successful French skier in the history of the World Cup

Cyclists

- Édouard Fachleitner, (1921–2008), racing cyclist called the Shepherd from Manosque
- Julien El Fares (1985 at Manosque – ) cyclist.

=== Philosophers, poets, writers ===
- Alphonse Rabbe (1786 at Riez – 1830), romantic poet in prose, Album of a pessimist
- Paul Arène (1843 at Sisteron – 1896) writer and poet
- Lazarine Negro (1848–1899), a poet from Manosque, a member of Félibrige
- Elemir Bourges (1852 at Manosque – 1925), novelist, member of the Académie Goncourt
- Alexandra David-Neel (1868–1969), explorer and Franco-Belgian writer, a resident of Digne in 1926 until his death in 1969
- Germaine Waton Ferry (1885 at Riez – 1956), poet, member of Félibrige
- Alexandre Arnoux (1884–1973), novelist, playwright
- Maria Borrely (1890 at Puimoisson – 1963), novelist
- Regis Messac (1893–1945), writer
- Jean Giono (1895 at Manosque – 1970), writer
- Jean Proal (1904 at Seyne-les-Alpes – 1969), writer
- Pierre Magnan (1922 at Manosque – 2012), writer
- Cécile Sauvage (1883–1927), poet, lived in Digne
- Felicien Champsaur (1858 at Turriers – 1934), writer

=== Miscellaneous ===
Religious

- Tulle de Manosque (?-430), daughter of Eucherius of Lyon
- Fauste de Riez (408–495), bishop and theologian of free will
- Mayeul de Cluny (906 at Valensole – 994). Fourth abbot of Cluny.
- John of Matha (1160 at Faucon-de-Barcelonnette – 1215), priest, founder of the Trinitarian Order to recover prisoners of the Saracens
- Jacques Chastan (1803 at Marcoux – 1839), priest of Foreign Missions Society

People in the news

- Jack Cecil Drummond (1891–1952), assassinated at Lurs with his wife and daughter which triggered the Dominici affair

Others

The families Simiane, Agoult, and Ponteves, nobles of Provence

== Learned societies and associations ==
- Société scientifique et littéraire des Alpes-de-Haute-Provence, founded in 1878 by Father Jean-Joseph-Maxime Feraud
- Alpes de Lumière, a nonprofit organization founded in 1953 by Pierre Martel and state-approved
- Proserpine, a non-profit association founded in 1993 in order to know and protect the butterflies of Haute-Provence. Manages the butterfly garden (insects release) at Digne-les-Bains.
- Sabença de la Valeia is a learned society from the Ubaye Valley. It researches, studies and disseminates everything about the valley.

== Movies and TV films made in the department ==
(TV films in Italics)

- 1925: Les Misérables by Henri Fescourt with Gabriel Gabrio (in French)
- 1934: Les Misérables by Raymond Bernard with Harry Baur (in French)
- 1953: La Route Napoléon by Jean Delannoy with Pierre Fresnay (in French)
- 1958: L'Eau vive by François Villiers with Pascale Audret (in French)
- 1960: Crésus by Jean Giono with Fernandel (in French)
- 1970: La Maison des bories by Jacques Doniol-Valcroze with Marie Dubois, Maurice Garrel, Mathieu Carrière, and Marie-Véronique Maurin (in French)
- 1973: L'Affaire Dominici by Claude Bernard-Aubert with Jean Gabin, Victor Lanoux, and Gérard Darrieu (in French)
- 1981: Les Babas Cool by François Leterrier with Christian Clavier, Marie-Anne Chazel, and Anémone (actress) (in French)
- 1986: Jean de Florette by Claude Berri with Daniel Auteuil, Gérard Depardieu, and Yves Montand (in French)
- 1988: La Maison assassinée by Georges Lautner with Patrick Bruel (in French)
- 1989: Après la guerre by Jean-Loup Hubert with Richard Bohringer (in French)
- 1995: Le Hussard sur le toit by Jean-Paul Rappeneau with Juliette Binoche, Olivier Martinez, and François Cluzet (in French)
- 2003: L'Affaire Dominici by Pierre Boutron with Michel Serrault and Michel Blanc (in French)
- 2006: Les Courriers de la mort by Philomène Esposito with Victor Lanoux (in French)
- 2007: C'est mieux la vie quand on est grand by Luc Béraud with Daniel Russo (in French)
- 2010: Le Sang des Atrides by Bruno Gantillon with Victor Lanoux (in French)

== See also ==
- Cantons of the Alpes-de-Haute-Provence department
- Communes of the Alpes-de-Haute-Provence department
- Arrondissements of the Alpes-de-Haute-Provence department
- Notre-Dame de l'Ortiguière
