= Saint-Martin-lès-Seyne =

- Commune
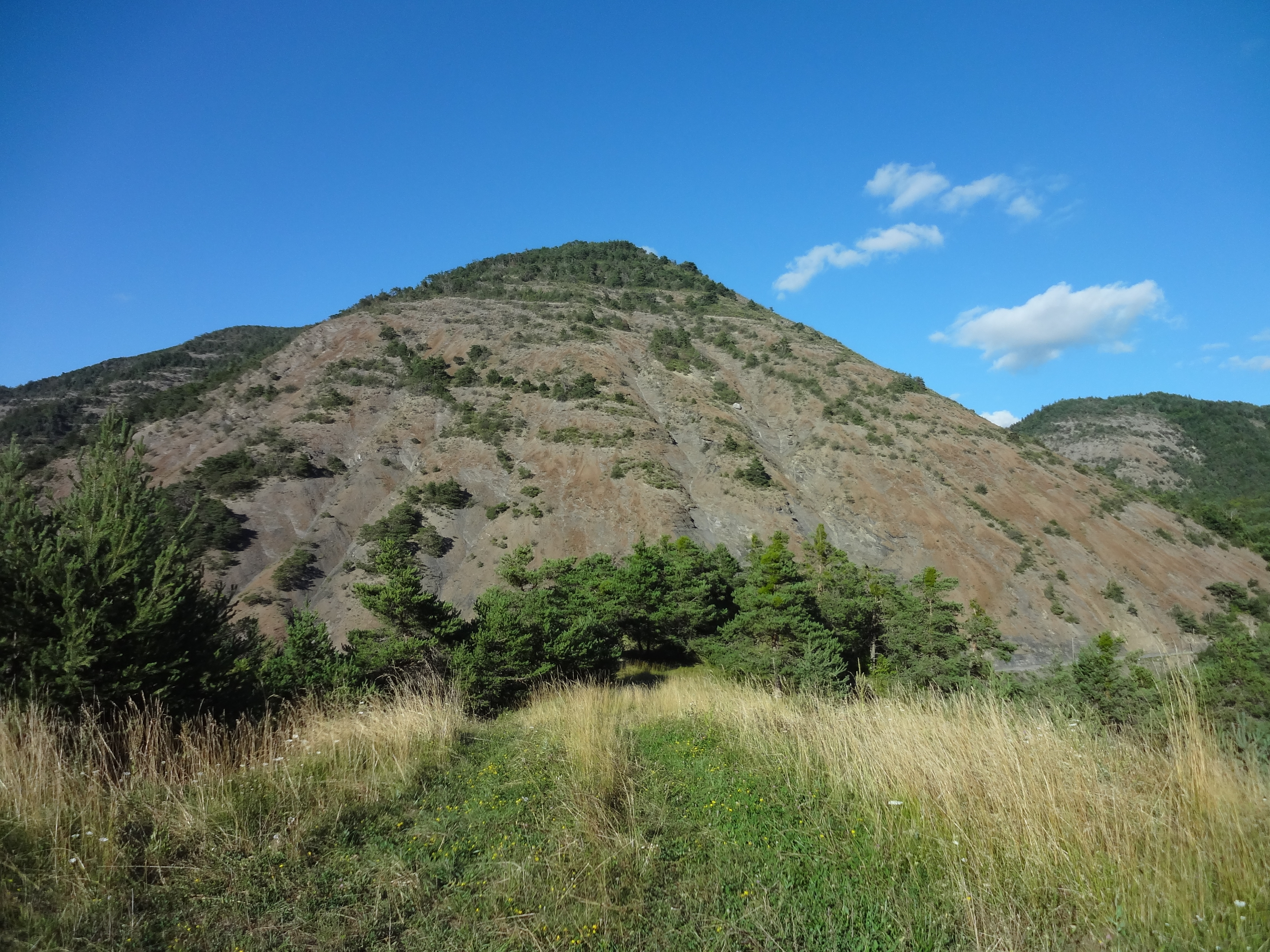
- Le Vendréou at 1,328 m (4,357 ft), in the commune of Saint-Martin-lès-Seyne
- Location of Saint-Martin-lès-Seyne
- Location within France Location within Provence-Alpes-Côte d'Azur
- Coordinates: 44°23′11″N 6°15′27″E
- Country: France
- Region: Provence-Alpes-Côte d'Azur
- Department: Alpes-de-Haute-Provence
- Arrondissement: Digne-les-Bains
- Canton: Seyne
- Intercommunality: Provence-Alpes Agglomération

Government
  - Mayor (2026–32): Childéric Reboul
- Area^{1}: 12.27 km^{2} (4.74 sq mi)
- Elevation: 1,100 m (3,600 ft)
- Highest elevation: 1,662 m (5,453 ft)
- Lowest elevation: 840 m (2,760 ft)
- Population (2023): 7
  - Density: 0.57/km^{2} (1.5/sq mi)
- Time zone: UTC+01:00 (CET)
  - Summer (DST): UTC+02:00 (CEST)
- INSEE/Postal code: 04191 /04140
- ^{1} French Land Register data, which excludes lakes, ponds, glaciers > 1 km^{2} (0.386 sq mi or 247 acres) and river estuaries.

Saint-Martin-lès-Seyne (French pronunciation: [sɛ̃ maʁtɛ̃ lɛ sɛn], literally Saint-Martin near Seyne; Vivaro-Alpine: Sant Martin de Sèina) is a commune in the Alpes-de-Haute-Provence department in southeastern France. With 7 inhabitants (as of 2023), it is the second least populated commune in the department, after Majastres.

== Population ==
Historical population
Year	Pop.	±% p.a.
1968	41	—
1975	34	−2.64%
1982	29	−2.25%
1990	15	−7.91%
1999	22	+4.35%
2007	19	−1.82%
2012	14	−5.92%
2017	14	+0.00%
2023	7	−10.91%
Source: INSEE

== See also ==
- Communes of the Alpes-de-Haute-Provence department
