= List of French departments by population =

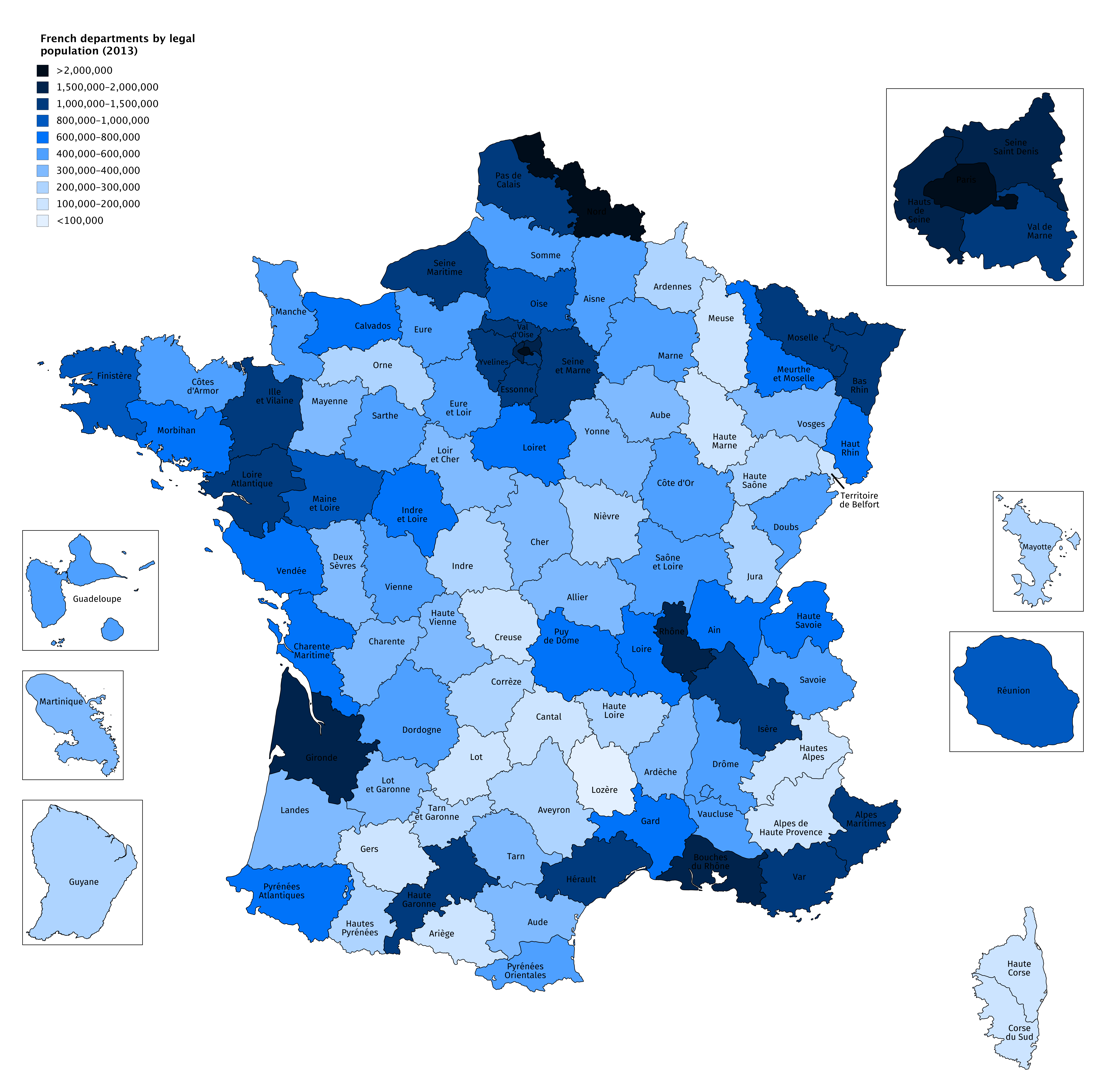
French departments by legal population in 2013

Population density by department (population per sq km)

This table lists the 101 French departments in descending order of population, area and population density.

== Data description ==
The figures include:

- population without double counting for 1999;
- municipal population (legal population in 2008, with effect from 1 January 2011) published in decree No. 2010-1723 of 30 December 2010 as amended by Decree No. 2011-343 of 28 March 2011 which corresponds to data compiled as at 1 January 2008.
- municipal population (legal population in 2019 with effect from 1 January 2022)

The total population takes into account double counting.

== Evolution ==
Between 1999 and 2006 all French departments had grown in population with the exception of the following seven departments: Allier and Cantal in Auvergne, Creuse in Limousin, Ardennes and Haute-Marne in Champagne-Ardenne, Nièvre in Burgundy, and Vosges in Lorraine. See population decline for more information.

In contrast the seven departments that have gained the most population in absolute value are Haute-Garonne, Gironde, Bouches-du-Rhône, Seine-Saint-Denis, Loire-Atlantique, Hauts-de Seine, and Hérault.

Guadeloupe has seemingly lost population between 1999 and 2008. However, this diminution of the legal population is due to the creation of the overseas communities of Saint Barthélemy and Saint Martin. In the 1999 census, the population of Guadeloupe without the arrondissement of Saint-Martin-Saint-Barthélemy was 386,566 inhabitants. The department's population has actually increased by more than 15,000 people over the period based on a constant territory.

== List of departments by descending population ==
| Department | Legal population | | | | Area km^{2} | Density /km^{2} | INSEE Dept. No. |
| Department | 1931 | 1999 | 2008 | 2019 | Area km^{2} | Density /km^{2} | INSEE Dept. No. |
|---|---|---|---|---|---|---|---|
| Nord | 2,029,449 | 2,555,020 | 2,564,959 | 2,608,346 | 5,743 | 454 | 59 |
| Paris | 2,891,020 | 2,125,246 | 2,211,297 | 2,165,423 | 105 | 20,545 | 75 |
| Bouches-du-Rhône | 1,101,672 | 1,835,719 | 1,966,005 | 2,043,110 | 5,087 | 402 | 13 |
| Rhône | 1,046,028 | 1,578,869 | 1,690,498 | (Note: Including the Lyon Metropolis)1,875,747 | 3,249 | 583 | 69 |
| Seine-Saint-Denis | 769,315 | 1,382,861 | 1,506,466 | 1,644,903 | 236 | 6,964 | 93 |
| Hauts-de-Seine | 949,231 | 1,428,881 | 1,549,619 | 1,624,357 | 176 | 9,250 | 92 |
| Gironde | 852,768 | 1,287,334 | 1,421,276 | 1,623,749 | 10,725 | 163 | 33 |
| Pas-de-Calais | 1,205,191 | 1,441,568 | 1,459,531 | 1,465,278 | 6,671 | 220 | 62 |
| Yvelines | 408,282 | 1,354,308 | 1,406,053 | 1,448,207 | 2,284 | 634 | 78 |
| Loire-Atlantique | 652,079 | 1,134,266 | 1,255,871 | 1,429,272 | 6,815 | 208 | 44 |
| Seine-et-Marne | 406,108 | 1,193,767 | 1,303,702 | 1,421,197 | 5,915 | 240 | 77 |
| Val-de-Marne | 657,322 | 1,227,250 | 1,310,876 | 1,407,124 | 245 | 5,743 | 94 |
| Haute-Garonne | 441,799 | 1,046,338 | 1,217,344 | 1,400,039 | 6,309 | 222 | 31 |
| Essonne | 271,094 | 1,134,238 | 1,205,850 | 1,301,659 | 1,804 | 721 | 91 |
| Isère | 584,017 | 1,094,006 | 1,188,660 | 1,271,166 | 7,431 | 171 | 38 |
| Seine-Maritime | 905,278 | 1,239,138 | 1,248,580 | 1,255,633 | 6,278 | 200 | 76 |
| Val-d'Oise | 353,374 | 1,105,464 | 1,165,397 | 1,249,674 | 1,246 | 1,003 | 95 |
| Hérault | 514,819 | 896,441 | 1,019,798 | 1,175,623 | 6,101 | 193 | 34 |
| Bas-Rhin | 688,242 | 1,026,120 | 1,091,015 | 1,140,057 | 4,755 | 240 | 67 |
| Alpes-Maritimes | 493,376 | 1,011,326 | 1,084,428 | 1,094,283 | 4,299 | 255 | 06 |
| Ille-et-Vilaine | 562,558 | 867,533 | 967,588 | 1,079,498 | 6,775 | 159 | 35 |
| Var | 377,104 | 898,441 | 1,001,408 | 1,076,711 | 5,973 | 180 | 83 |
| Moselle | 693,408 | 1,023,447 | 1,042,230 | 1,046,543 | 6,216 | 168 | 57 |
| Finistère | 744,295 | 852,418 | 890,509 | 915,090 | 6,733 | 136 | 29 |
| Réunion | – | 706,300 | 808,250 | 861,210 | 2,504 | 344 | 974 |
| Oise | 407,432 | 766,441 | 799,725 | 829,419 | 5,860 | 142 | 60 |
| Haute-Savoie | 252,794 | 631,679 | 716,277 | 826,094 | 4,388 | 188 | 74 |
| Maine-et-Loire | 475,991 | 732,942 | 774,823 | 818,273 | 7,166 | 115 | 49 |
| Haut-Rhin | 516,726 | 708,025 | 746,072 | 767,086 | 3,525 | 218 | 68 |
| Loire | 664,822 | 728,524 | 742,076 | 765,634 | 4,781 | 160 | 42 |
| Morbihan | 537,528 | 643,873 | 710,034 | 759,684 | 6,823 | 111 | 56 |
| Gard | 406,815 | 623,125 | 694,323 | 748,437 | 5,853 | 128 | 30 |
| Meurthe-et-Moselle | 592,632 | 713,779 | 729,768 | 733,760 | 5,246 | 140 | 54 |
| Calvados | 401,356 | 648,385 | 678,206 | 694,905 | 5,548 | 126 | 14 |
| Vendée | 390,396 | 539,664 | 616,906 | 685,442 | 6,720 | 102 | 85 |
| Pyrénées-Atlantiques | 422,719 | 600,018 | 647,420 | 682,621 | 7,645 | 89 | 64 |
| Loiret | 342,679 | 618,126 | 650,769 | 680,434 | 6,775 | 100 | 45 |
| Puy-de-Dôme | 500,590 | 604,266 | 628,485 | 662,152 | 7,970 | 83 | 63 |
| Ain | 322,918 | 515,270 | 581,355 | 652,432 | 5,762 | 113 | 01 |
| Charente-Maritime | 415,249 | 557,024 | 611,714 | 651,358 | 6,864 | 95 | 17 |
| Indre-et-Loire | 335,226 | 554,003 | 585,406 | 610,079 | 6,127 | 100 | 37 |
| Côtes-d'Armor | 539,531 | 542,373 | 581,570 | 600,582 | 6,878 | 87 | 22 |
| Eure | 305,788 | 541,054 | 577,087 | 599,507 | 6,040 | 99 | 27 |
| Somme | 466,626 | 555,551 | 568,086 | 570,559 | 6,170 | 93 | 80 |
| Marne | 412,156 | 565,229 | 566,010 | 566,855 | 8,162 | 69 | 51 |
| Sarthe | 384,619 | 529,851 | 559,587 | 566,412 | 6,206 | 91 | 72 |
| Vaucluse | 241,689 | 499,685 | 538,902 | 561,469 | 3,567 | 157 | 84 |
| Saône-et-Loire | 538,741 | 544,893 | 553,968 | 551,493 | 8,575 | 64 | 71 |
| Doubs | 305,500 | 499,062 | 522,685 | 543,974 | 5,234 | 104 | 25 |
| Côte-d'Or | 333,800 | 506,755 | 521,608 | 534,124 | 8,763 | 61 | 21 |
| Aisne | 489,368 | 535,489 | 538,790 | 531,345 | 7,369 | 72 | 02 |
| Drôme | 267,080 | 437,778 | 478,069 | 516,762 | 6,530 | 79 | 26 |
| Manche | 433,473 | 481,471 | 496,937 | 495,045 | 5,938 | 83 | 50 |
| Pyrénées-Orientales | 238,647 | 392,803 | 441,387 | 479,979 | 4,116 | 117 | 66 |
| Vienne | 303,072 | 399,024 | 424,354 | 438,435 | 6,990 | 63 | 86 |
| Savoie | 235,544 | 373,258 | 408,842 | 436,434 | 6,028 | 72 | 73 |
| Eure-et-Loir | 254,790 | 407,665 | 423,559 | 431,575 | 5,880 | 73 | 28 |
| Landes | 257,186 | 327,334 | 373,142 | 413,690 | 9,243 | 45 | 40 |
| Dordogne | 383,720 | 388,293 | 409,388 | 413,223 | 9,060 | 46 | 24 |
| Tarn | 302,994 | 343,402 | 371,738 | 389,844 | 5,758 | 68 | 81 |
| Guadeloupe | – | 422,496 | 401,784 | 384,239 | 1,628 | 236 | 971 |
| Deux-Sèvres | 308,481 | 344,392 | 365,059 | 374,878 | 5,999 | 63 | 79 |
| Aude | 296,880 | 309,770 | 349,237 | 374,070 | 6,139 | 61 | 11 |
| Haute-Vienne | 335,873 | 353,893 | 373,940 | 372,359 | 5,520 | 68 | 87 |
| Martinique | – | 381,427 | 397,693 | 364,508 | 1,128 | 323 | 972 |
| Vosges | 377,980 | 380,952 | 380,145 | 364,499 | 5,874 | 62 | 88 |
| Charente | 310,489 | 339,628 | 351,581 | 352,015 | 5,956 | 59 | 16 |
| Allier | 373,924 | 344,721 | 342,807 | 335,975 | 7,340 | 46 | 03 |
| Yonne | 275,755 | 333,221 | 342,359 | 335,707 | 7,427 | 45 | 89 |
| Lot-et-Garonne | 247,500 | 305,380 | 326,399 | 331,271 | 5,361 | 62 | 47 |
| Loir-et-Cher | 241,592 | 314,968 | 326,599 | 329,470 | 6,343 | 52 | 41 |
| Ardèche | 282,911 | 286,023 | 311,452 | 328,278 | 5,529 | 59 | 07 |
| Aube | 242,596 | 292,131 | 301,327 | 310,242 | 6,004 | 52 | 10 |
| Mayenne | 254,479 | 285,338 | 302,983 | 307,062 | 5,175 | 59 | 53 |
| Cher | 293,918 | 314,428 | 313,251 | 302,306 | 7,235 | 42 | 18 |
| Guyane | – | 157,213 | 219,266 | 281,678 | 83,534 | 3 | 973 |
| Orne | 273,717 | 292,337 | 292,282 | 279,942 | 6,103 | 46 | 61 |
| Aveyron | 323,782 | 263,808 | 275,889 | 279,595 | 8,735 | 32 | 12 |
| Ardennes | 293,746 | 290,130 | 284,197 | 270,582 | 5,229 | 52 | 08 |
| Mayotte | – | 131,320 | 186,452 | 269,579 | 374 | 720 | 976 |
| Tarn-et-Garonne | 164,259 | 206,034 | 235,915 | 260,669 | 3,718 | 70 | 82 |
| Jura | 229,109 | 250,857 | 260,740 | 259,199 | 4,999 | 52 | 39 |
| Corrèze | 264,129 | 232,576 | 242,896 | 240,073 | 5,857 | 41 | 19 |
| Haute-Saône | 219,257 | 229,732 | 238,548 | 235,313 | 5,360 | 44 | 70 |
| Hautes-Pyrénées | 189,993 | 222,368 | 229,079 | 229,567 | 4,464 | 51 | 65 |
| Haute-Loire | 251,608 | 209,113 | 221,834 | 227,570 | 4,977 | 46 | 43 |
| Indre | 247,912 | 231,139 | 232,004 | 219,316 | 6,791 | 32 | 36 |
| Nièvre | 255,195 | 225,198 | 220,653 | 204,452 | 6,817 | 30 | 58 |
| Gers | 193,134 | 172,335 | 185,266 | 191,377 | 6,257 | 31 | 32 |
| Meuse | 215,819 | 192,198 | 194,218 | 184,083 | 6,211 | 30 | 55 |
| Haute-Corse | – | 141,603 | 162,013 | 181,933 | 4,666 | 39 | 2B |
| Lot | 166,637 | 160,197 | 172,796 | 174,094 | 5,217 | 33 | 46 |
| Haute-Marne | 189,791 | 194,873 | 186,470 | 172,512 | 6,211 | 28 | 52 |
| Alpes-de-Haute-Provence | 87,566 | 139,561 | 157,965 | 164,308 | 6,925 | 24 | 04 |
| Corse-du-Sud | – | 118,593 | 140,953 | 158,507 | 4,014 | 40 | 2A |
| Ariège | 161,265 | 137,205 | 150,201 | 153,287 | 4,890 | 31 | 09 |
| Cantal | 193,505 | 150,778 | 148,737 | 144,692 | 5,726 | 25 | 15 |
| Territoire de Belfort | 99,403 | 137,408 | 141,958 | 141,318 | 609 | 232 | 90 |
| Hautes-Alpes | 87,566 | 121,419 | 134,205 | 141,220 | 5,549 | 26 | 05 |
| Creuse | 207,882 | 124,470 | 123,907 | 116,617 | 5,565 | 21 | 23 |
| Lozère | 101,849 | 73,509 | 76,973 | 76,604 | 5,167 | 15 | 48 |
