= Arrondissements of the Alpes-de-Haute-Provence department =

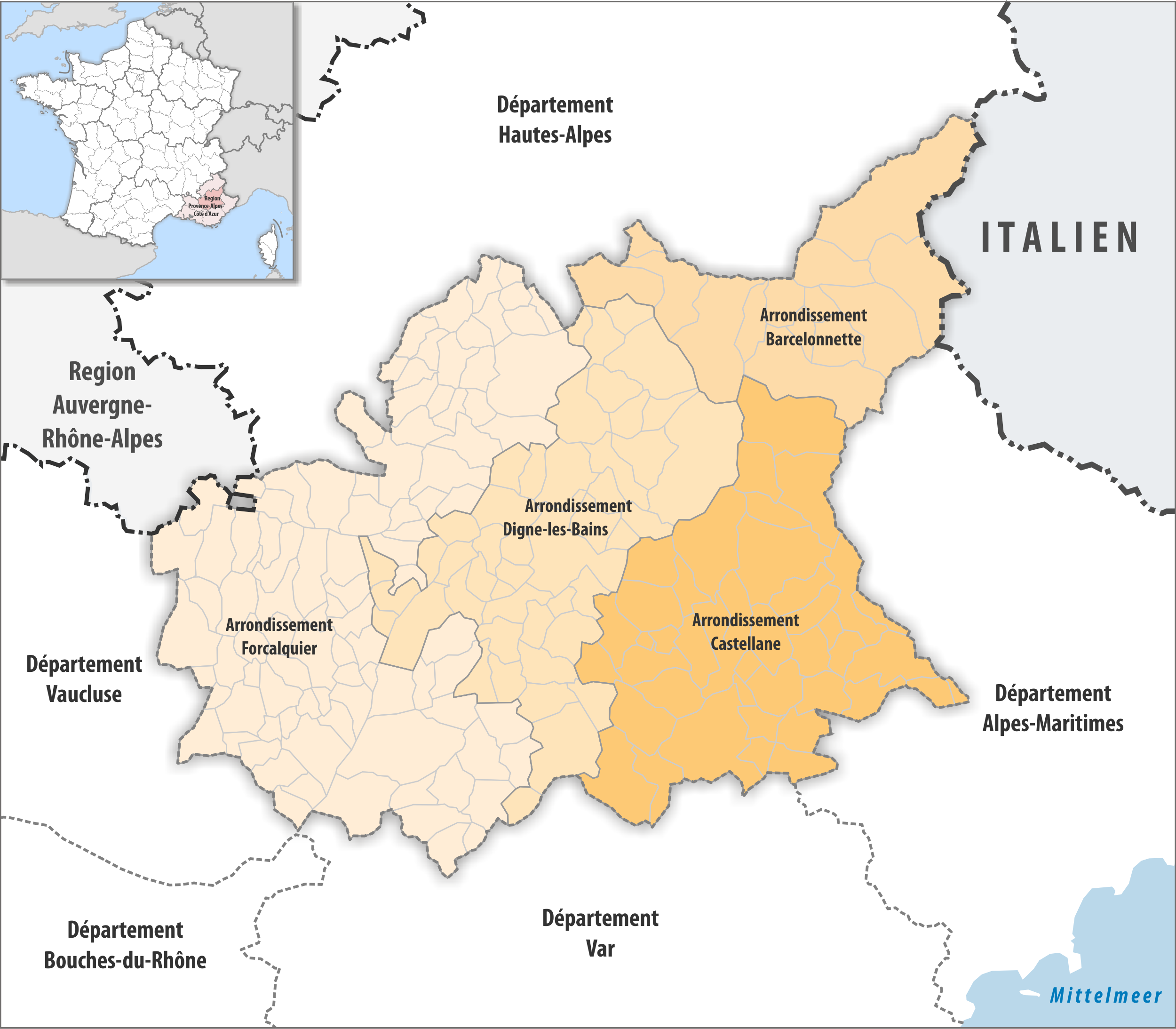
Map of arrondissements of the Alpes-de-Haute-Provence department.

The 4 arrondissements of the Alpes-de-Haute-Provence department are:

1. Arrondissement of Barcelonnette, (subprefecture: Barcelonnette) with 14 communes. The population of the arrondissement was 7,712 in 2021.
2. Arrondissement of Castellane, (subprefecture: Castellane) with 41 communes. The population of the arrondissement was 11,388 in 2021.
3. Arrondissement of Digne-les-Bains, (prefecture of the Alpes-de-Haute-Provence department: Digne-les-Bains) with 46 communes. The population of the arrondissement was 48,136 in 2021.
4. Arrondissement of Forcalquier, (subprefecture: Forcalquier) with 97 communes. The population of the arrondissement was 98,841 in 2021.

== History ==
In 1800 the arrondissements of Digne, Barcelonnette, Castellane, Forcalquier and Sisteron were established. The arrondissements of Castellane and Sisteron were disbanded in 1926. The arrondissement of Castellane was restored in 1942.

The borders of the arrondissements of Alpes-de-Haute-Provence were modified in January 2017:

- nine communes from the arrondissement of Digne-les-Bains to the arrondissement of Castellane
- 16 communes from the arrondissement of Digne-les-Bains to the arrondissement of Forcalquier
- six communes from the arrondissement of Forcalquier to the arrondissement of Digne-les-Bains
