= Société scientifique et littéraire des Alpes-de-Haute-Provence =

The Société scientifique et littéraire des Alpes-de-Haute-Provence is a learned society founded in 1878. It was originally called the Société scientifique et littéraire des Basses-Alpes, before the department's name change. Its offices are in Digne-les-Bains, the administrative centre of the department. It was decreed a departmental registered nonprofit organisation on July 6, 1981. The society claims close to four hundred members and publishes a biannual journal Chroniques de Haute Provence.

Its goal is to promote the sciences, the classics, and the arts, and includes anything which concerns or is related to the department in an historical, scientific, or literary way. It has published many works of recognized quality, distributed to a number of European societies and universities. Its publications have appeared under a number of names: Annales des Basses-Alpes followed by Annales de Haute-Provence and finally Chroniques de Haute-Provence. These publications have been indexed and filed by the Alpes-de-Haute-Provence archives department. Many libraries shelve these works.

Since 1969, the society has appointed a committee to protect the monuments and sites in Haute-Provence. The committee has made it its aim to safeguard, restore, and highlight the department's monuments and sites. It acts in concert with other associations which share the same goals in the protection of the architectural heritage of Haute-Provence.

== Members of the society, authors published in the Annales or the Chroniques ==
- Abbot Jean-Joseph-Maxime Feraud (1810-1897), historian, first president
- Raymond Collier, archivist, historian

== See also ==
- Society website
