= Majastres =

- Commune
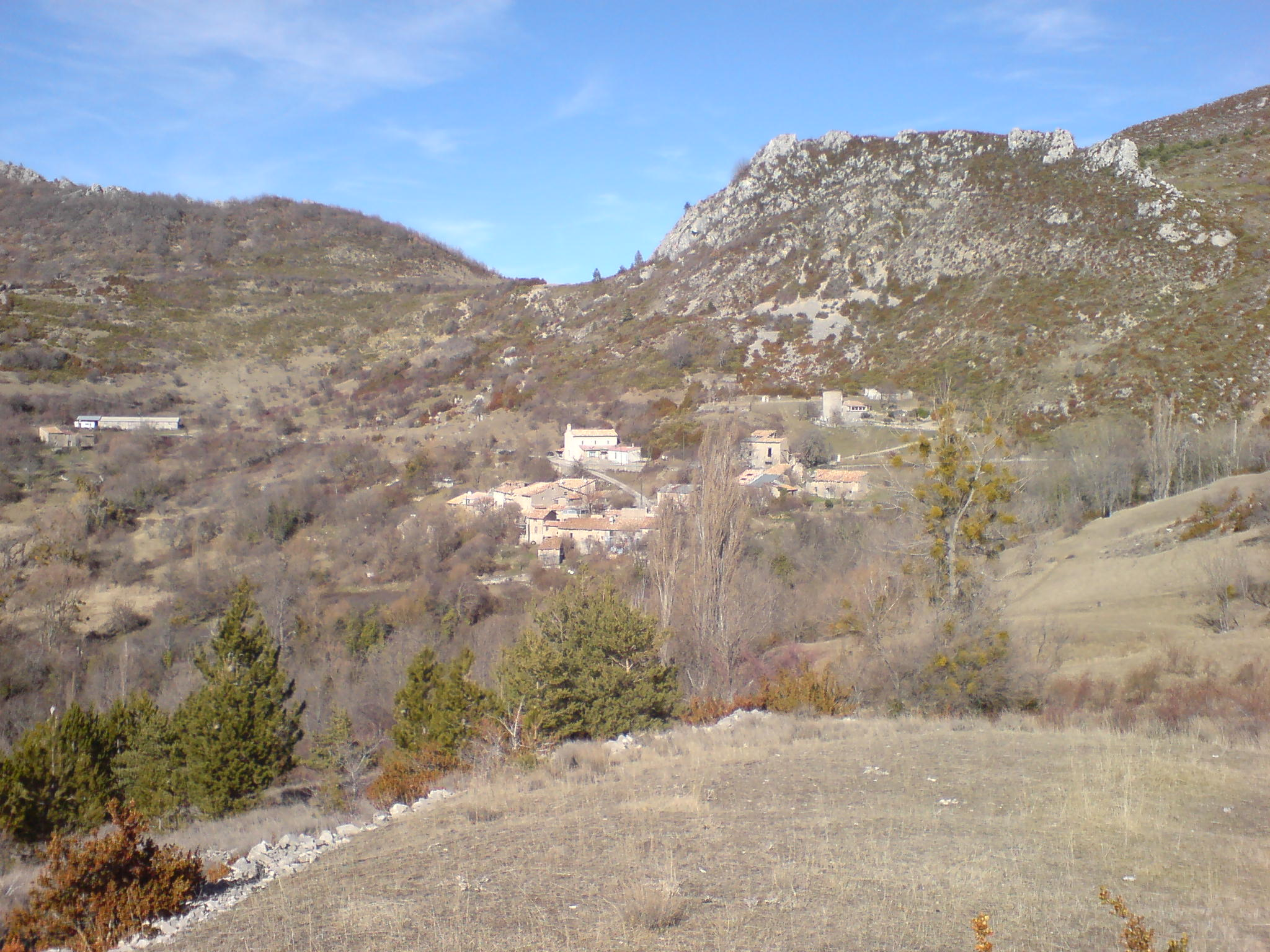
- A general view of the village of Majastres

- Coat of arms
- Location of Majastres
- Location within France Location within Provence-Alpes-Côte d'Azur
- Coordinates: 43°54′51″N 6°17′23″E
- Country: France
- Region: Provence-Alpes-Côte d'Azur
- Department: Alpes-de-Haute-Provence
- Arrondissement: Digne-les-Bains
- Canton: Riez
- Intercommunality: Provence-Alpes Agglomération

Government
  - Mayor (2026–32): Jean Sévenier
- Area^{1}: 29.85 km^{2} (11.53 sq mi)
- Elevation: 1,143 m (3,750 ft)
- Highest elevation: 1,860 m (6,100 ft)
- Lowest elevation: 800 m (2,600 ft)
- Population (2023): 5
  - Density: 0.17/km^{2} (0.43/sq mi)
- Time zone: UTC+01:00 (CET)
  - Summer (DST): UTC+02:00 (CEST)
- INSEE/Postal code: 04107 /04270
- ^{1} French Land Register data, which excludes lakes, ponds, glaciers > 1 km^{2} (0.386 sq mi or 247 acres) and river estuaries.

Majastres (French pronunciation: [maʒastʁ]) is a commune in the Alpes-de-Haute-Provence department in southeastern France. With 5 inhabitants (as of 2023), it is the least populated commune in the department. It is also the least populous commune in France to have its own coat of arms.

== Population ==
Historical population
Year	Pop.	±% p.a.
1968	20	—
1975	14	−4.97%
1982	12	−2.18%
1990	10	−2.25%
1999	8	−2.45%
2007	2	−15.91%
2012	2	+0.00%
2017	4	+14.87%
2023	5	+3.79%
Source: INSEE

== See also ==
- Communes of the Alpes-de-Haute-Provence department
