= Alemannic =

Alemannic (Alamannic) or Alamanni may refer to:

- Alemannic German, a group of Upper German dialects
- Alemanni, a confederation of Suebian Germanic tribes in the Roman period
- Alamanni (surname)

== See also ==
- Alemannia (disambiguation)
- Alemannic separatism
- Allemand (disambiguation)
