= September 28 (Eastern Orthodox liturgics) =

Day in the Eastern Orthodox liturgical calendar

Eastern Orthodox liturgical calendar
September 27	September 28	September 29
September 28 O.S. ≍ October 11 N.S. September 28 N.S ≍ September 15 O.S.

An Eastern Orthodox cross

September 28 in Eastern Orthodox liturgical calendars is a feast day and a day of commemoration of saints and martyrs. Although some Orthodox churches use the Revised Julian Calendar and others use the traditional Julian calendar, the fixed commemorations for their respective September 28 are broadly the same, no matter which calendar is used. (Note: Despite the dates being the same, the days to which they refer typically differ by 13 days. The notation Old Style or O.S. is sometimes used to indicate a date in the traditional Julian Calendar (the "Old Calendar"). The notation New Style or N.S. indicates a date in the Revised Julian calendar (the "New Calendar").)

== Saints ==
- Prophet Baruch (6th century BC)
- Martyrs Eustathios of Rome and Callinicus, by the sword.
- Venerable Chariton the Confessor, Abbot, of Palestine (350)
- Martyrs Alexander, Alphius and Zosimas, brothers, Mark the Shepherd, Nicon, Neon, Heliodorus, and 24 others, in Pisidia and Phrygia (4th century) (Note: "At Antioch, in Pisidia, the holy martyrs Mark, shepherd, Alphius, Alexander, and Zosimus, his brothers, Nicon, Neon Heliodorus, and thirty soldiers, who were converted to Christ on seeing the miracles of blessed Mark, and were crowned with martyrdom in different places and in various manners.")
- Saint Alkison, Bishop of Nicopolis (Preveza) in Epirus (561)
- Martyr Wenceslas (Vyacheslav) I of Bohemia, Prince of the Czechs (935) (Note: Prince of the Czechs, he was brought up in the Orthodox Faith by his grandmother, the future martyr Ludmilla. During a pagan reaction in 922, which he tried to stop through patience and mildness, he too was martyred as a result of a political conspiracy. He is the patron saint of the Czech Republic.) (Note: "IN Bohemia, St. Wenceslas, duke of Bohemia and martyr, renowned for holiness and miracles. Being murdered in his brother's house, he went triumphantly to heaven.")

== Pre-Schism Western saints ==
- Saint Paternus, Born in Bilbao in Spain, he was one of the earliest Bishops of Auch in France (2nd century)
- Saint Privatus, a citizen of Rome scourged to death under Alexander Severus (223) (Note: "At Rome, St. Privatus, martyr, who was cured of ulcers by the blessed pope Callistus. For the faith of Christ he was scourged to death with leaded whips, in the time of the emperor Alexander.")
- Martyr Stacteus, in Rome. (Note: "In the same place, St. Stacteus, martyr.")
- Martyrs Martial, Laurence and Companions, A group of twenty-two martyrs in North Africa. (Note: "In Africa, the Saints Martial, Lawrence, and twenty other martyrs.")
- Saint Exuperius (Exupère, Soupire), Bishop of Toulouse, Confessor (411) (Note: He was noted for his generosity in sending large contributions to the poor in Palestine and Egypt.) (Note: "At Toulouse, St. Exuperius, bishop and confessor. St. Jerome bears to this blessed man a memorable testimony, relating how severe he was towards himself and how liberal towards others.")
- Saint Eustochium, Abbess of a convent in Bethlehem, an early Desert Mother (419) (Note: Born in Rome, she was the third daughter of St Paula. She joined her mother in Bethlehem and succeeded her mother as abbess of a convent in Bethlehem in 404.) (Note: "The same day, the holy virgin Eustochium, daughter of blessed Paula, who was brought up at the manger of our Lord with other virgins, and being celebrated for merits, went to our Lord.")
- Saint Silvinus, Bishop of Brescia in Italy (444)
- Saint Faustus of Riez, Bishop of Riez (495) (Note: Born in Brittany, Faustus became a monk at Lérins in France and later abbot (433). In about 459 he became Bishop of Riez. He fought both Arianism and Pelagianism and was very influential, maintaining the Orthodox teaching of St Cassian.)
- Saint Machan, disciple of St. Cadoc. (Note: Born in Scotland, he became a monk in Ireland.)
- Saint Conwall (Conval), born in Ireland, he was a disciple of St Kentigern and preached in Scotland (c. 630)
- Hieromartyr Annemund (Chamond), Archbishop of Lyon in France, he was murdered in Châlon-sur-Saône by the tyrant Ebroin (657)
- Saints Willigod and Martin, monks at Moyenmoutier in France who founded the monastery of Romont (c. 690)
- Saint Tetta, Abbess of Wimborne in Dorset, who sent nuns from her 500-strong convent to St Boniface (c. 772) (Note: Abbess of Wimborne in Dorset in England. She helped St Boniface by sending him nuns from her 500-strong convent, among whom were Sts Lioba and Thecla.) (Note: "ST. TETTA, Virgin and Abbess, was the spiritual mother of St. Lioba and St. Thecla, and the friend and correspondent of St. Boniface. This holy virgin governed the double Monastery of Wimborne, in such perfection, that both communities were renowned for their sanctity of life. She was so rigorous in enforcing the enclosure in the women's monastery, that not even prelates were allowed to enter; but while she insisted on the observance of discipline, she was most careful to promote a spirit of true charity among her daughters, who at one time numbered 500, and to encourage study as well as piety. Even during her lifetime many miracles were attributed to her intercession by her devoted children. The day of her death does not seem to be known; but in some calendars her memory is kept on the 12th August, and in others on the 17th December.")
- Saint Lioba, Abbess of Tauberbischofsheim, English missionary to Germany (c. 781) (Note: "In Germany, St. Lioba, virgin, renowned for miracles.") (Note: A relative of St Boniface, St Lioba became a nun at Wimborne. In 748, at the request of St Boniface, she left England for Germany together with a group of nuns and became Abbess of Bischoffsheim. She was greatly loved by her nuns. St Lioba's convents were one of the most important factors in the conversion of Germany.) (Note: "ST. LlOBA, otherwise called LlOBGYTHA and TRUTHGEBA, was a kinswoman of the Martyr St. Boniface, and the offspring of parents, who had remained childless till the approach of old age. In gratitude for this gift of God, they committed their child in her early infancy to the care of Tetta, the holy Abbess of Wimborne...Through a remarkable dream, interpreted by a pious religious of the house, it was made known to her, that God destined her for some great work in His service; and the revelation was accomplished, when St. Boniface wrote to the Abbess to request that Lioba might be sent to him in Germany, to take the direction of the monastery for women, which he was founding at Bischoffsheim...Strict as she was in enforcing the observance of St. Benedict's rule, still she was compassionate with the infirmities of all, and watched them with the eye of a tender mother... ...So loving an abbess was gladly obeyed: her word and example were a law, to which all paid a cheerful submission, and the Monastery of Bischoffsheim became a school of religious perfection, from which other communities sought to obtain superiors for themselves.")

== Post-Schism Orthodox saints ==
- Venerable Auxentius the Alaman, ascetic and Wonderworker, leader of the "300 Allemagne Saints" of Cyprus (12th century) (Note: Venerable Auxentius was one of the "300 Allemagne Saints" in Cyprus and their leader. The 300 Allemagne Saints came to Cyprus from Palestine, and lived as ascetics in various parts of the island. Included among the "300 Allemagne Saints" are: Venerable Anastasios the Wonderwoker of Cyprus, September 17; Venerable Abbacum the Ascetic of Cyprus, Wonderworker, December 2; Venerable Cassian the Martyr (Kassianos), December 4; Venerable Calantius of Tamassos (Kalandios), April 26; Martyr Constantine of Cyprus (Constantine of Allemagne), Wonderworker, July 1; According to some of their lives in the Great Synaxaristes, after the dissolution of the Second Crusade (1147 - 1149), they decided to live the monastic life in the Jordan desert. However since the Latins there disturbed them, they relocated to Cyprus and dispersed over the island.)
- Saints Cyril, Schemamonk, and Maria, Schemanun, parents of St. Sergius of Radonezh (c. 1337) (Note: See: (in Russian) Кирилл и Мария Радонежские. Википедии. (Russian Wikipedia).)
- Venerable Chariton, Abbot of Syandema Monastery, Vologda (1509)
- Venerable Chariton, of Trinity Kudin Monastery (ru) (16th century) (Note: See: (in Russian) Харитон Кудинский. Википедии. (Russian Wikipedia).)
- Venerable Herodion, founder of Iloezersk Monastery, Belozersk (1541) (Note: See: (in Russian) Иродион Илоезерский. Википедии. (Russian Wikipedia).)
- Venerable Igumen Zosima (Kartsev) of Orenburg, an ascetic of piety of the 19th–20th centuries (1920) (Note: The official communiqué of the Moscow Patriarchate was as follows: "ПОСТАНОВИЛИ: 1. Причислить к лику преподобных для местного почитания в Оренбургской митрополии игумена Зосиму (Карцева).: 2. Память преподобного Зосимы совершать 28 сентября / 11 октября в день памяти его небесного покровителя мученика Зосимы Калутинского.; 3. Честные останки преподобного Зосимы, в случае их обретения, считать святыми мощами и воздавать им достодолжное почитание.; 4. Писать новопрославленному святому иконы для поклонения, согласно определению VII Вселенского Собора, о чем иметь надзор Синодальной комиссии по иконописи.") (Note: See: (in Russian) Зосима Оренбургский. Википедии. (Russian Wikipedia).)
- Synaxis of the Holy Fathers of Kiev whose relics lie in the Near Caves of St. Anthony. (Note: See: (in Russian) Собор преподобных отцов Киево-Печерских в Ближних пещерах почивающих. Википедии. (Russian Wikipedia).) (Note: Among the Monastic Fathers of the Near Caves are: Anthony the First-Founder, Monk (1073), July 10; Abramius the Lover of Labor, Monk (12th-13th century), August 21; Abramius the Hermit, Monk (12th-13th century), October 29; Agapitus the Unmercenary Physician, Monk (c. 1095), June 1; Alexis the Hermit, Monk (13th century), April 24; Alypius the Iconographer, Monk (1114), August 17; Anastasius the Deacon, Monkmartyr (12th century), January 22; Anatolius the Hermit, Monk (12th century), July 3 and October 31; Arethas the Hermit, Monk (c. 1195), October 24; Athanasius the Hermit, Monk (c. 1176), December 2; Barlaam / Varlaam, Igumen of the Kievan Caves (1065), November 19; Basil and Theodore, Monkmartyrs (1098), August 11; Damian the Presbyter and Healer, Hieromonk (1071), October 5; Elias of Murom, Monk (c. 1188), December 19; Ephraim of Pereyaslavl, Bishop (c. 1098), January 28; Gerasim / Erasmus the Black-Robed, Monk (12th century), February 24; Eustratius, Monkmartyr (1097), March 28; Gregory the Iconographer, Monk (12th century), August 8; Gregory the Wonderworker, Martyr (1093), January 8; Helladius / Elladius the Hermit, Monk (12th-13th century), October 4; Isaac the Hermit, Monk (c. 1190), February 14; Isaiah the Wonderworker, Monk (1115), May 15; Jeremiah the Clairvoyant, Monk (11th century), October 5; John the Faster, Monk (12th century), December 7; John the God-pleasing (12th century), December 29; John the Infant, Martyr (11th-12th century), December 29 (commemorated with the 14,000 Infants killed at Bethlehem by Herod); John the Long-Suffering / John the Much-ailing, Monk (1160), July 18; Juliana, Princess of Olshansk, Nun (c. 1550), July 6; Kuksha, Enlightener of the Vyati, Hieromartyr, (12th century), August 27; Lawrence the Hermit, Bishop of Turov (12th century), January 29; Luke, Steward of the Kievan Caves, Monk (13th century), November 6; Macarius, Monk (12th century), January 19; Mark the Grave-digger, Monk (12th century), December 29; Matthew the Clairvoyant, Monk (11th century), October 5; Mercurius, Bishop of Smolensk (1239), August 7; Moses the Hungarian, Monkmartyr (c.1031-1043), July 26; Nectarius the Obedient, Monk (12th century), November 29; Nestor the Chronicler, Monk (c. 1114), October 27; Nicholas Svyatosha, Prince of Chernigov, Monk (1143), October 14; Nicodemus the Prosphora-baker, Monk (12th century), October 31; Nikon, Igumen of Kievan Caves (1088), March 23; Nikon the Lean / Nikon the Shriveled, Monk (12th century), December 11; Niphon / Niphont, Bishop of Novgorod (1156), April 8; Onesimus the Hermit, Monk (12th-13th century), October 4 and July 21; Onesiphorus the Confessor, Monk (1148), November 9; Onuphrius the Silent, Monk (12th century). July 21; Pimen the Faster, Monk (12th century), August 27; Pimen the Much-Ailing, Monk (1110), August 7; Polycarp, Archimandrite of the Kievan Caves (1182), July 24; Prochorus the Orach-eater, Gardener and Wonderworker, Monk (1107), February 10; Sava the God-pleasing, Monk (13th century), April 24; Sergius the Obedient, Monk (13th century), October 7; Simon, Bishop of Suzdal (12th century), May 10; Sisoes the Hermit, Monk (12th-13th century), October 24; Spyridon the Prosphora-baker, Monk (12th century), October 31; Sylvester the Wonderworker, Monk (12th century), January 2; Theophanes the Faster, Monk (12th century), October 11; Theophilus the Mourner / Theophilus the Clear-sighted, Monk (12th century), December 29; Theophilus the Hermit / Theophilus the Silent, Monk (12th-13th century), October 24; Titus / Tito the Hieromonk (1190), February 27; Twelve (12) Master Architects of Constantinople who painted the monastery church of the Dormition of the Most Holy Theotokos (11th century), February 14; Note: The "Synaxis of the Venerable Fathers of the Far Caves in Kiev" is held on August 28.; The "Synaxis of the Venerable Fathers of the Kiev Caves Lavra" is held on the second Sunday of Great Lent.)

=== New martyrs and confessors ===
- New Martyr Anna Lykoshin, at Solovki Monastery (1925)
- New Hieromartyr Hilarion (Gromov), Hieromonk, of Petushki, Vladimir (1937)
- Virgin-martyr Michaila (Ivanova), Schemanun, of Aksinyino, Moscow (1937)
- Virgin-martyr Tatiana Chekmazovoy (1942)

== Other commemorations ==
- Uncovering of the relics of St. Neophytus the Recluse, of Cyprus (1214)

== Icon gallery ==
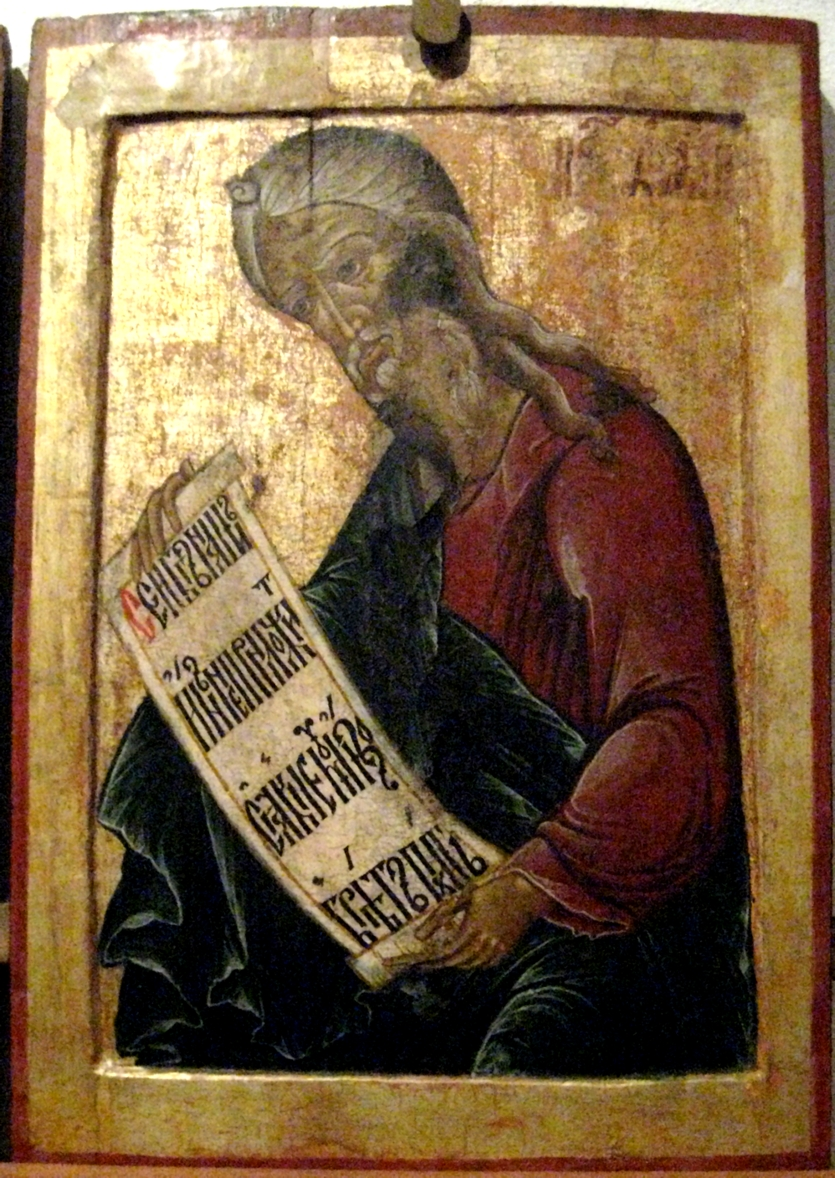
Prophet Baruch.

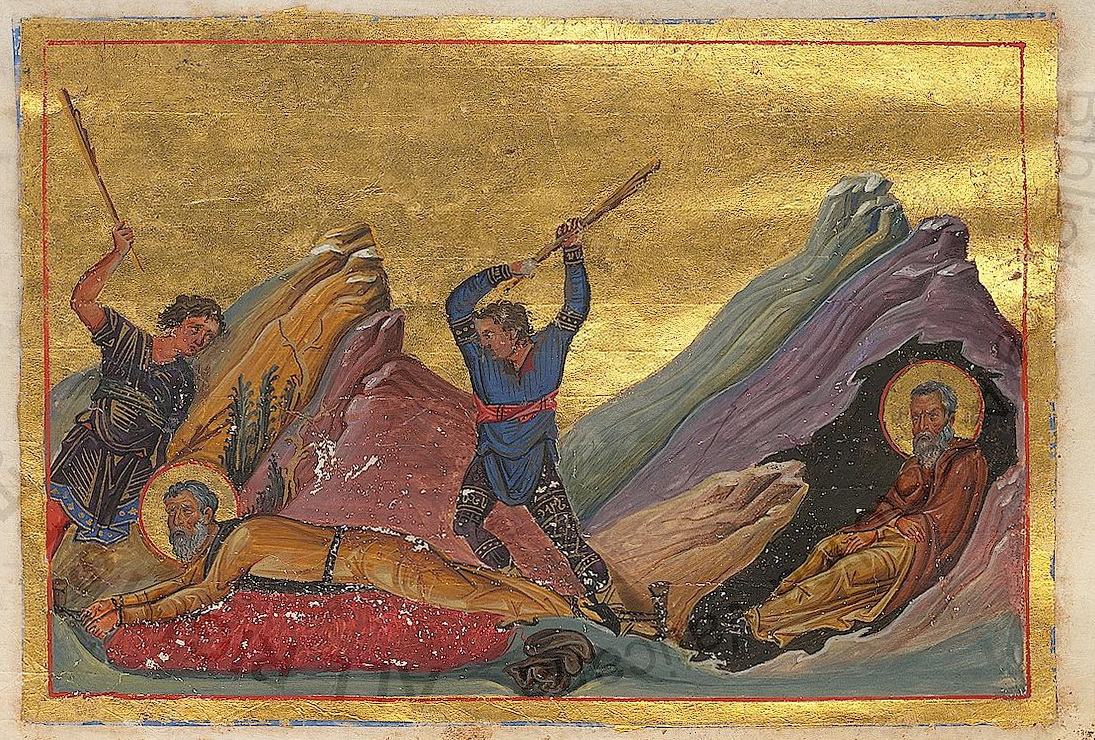
Venerable Chariton the Confessor.
(Menologion of Basil II, 10th century).

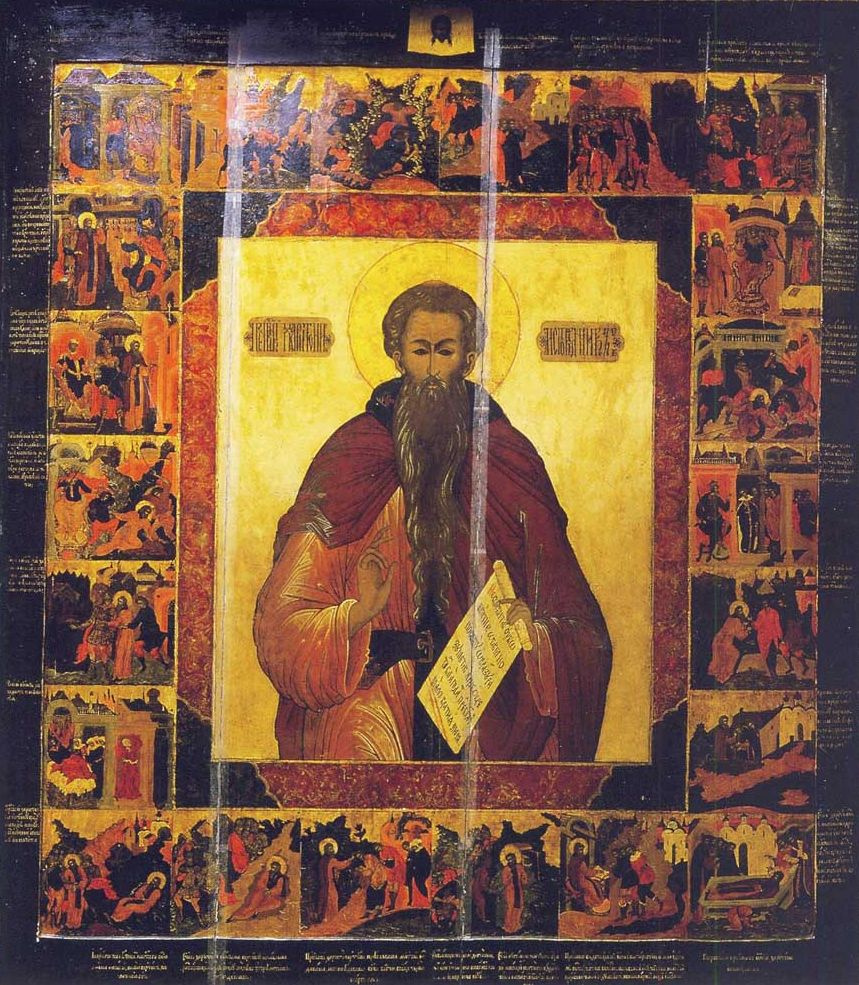
Venerable Chariton the Confessor.

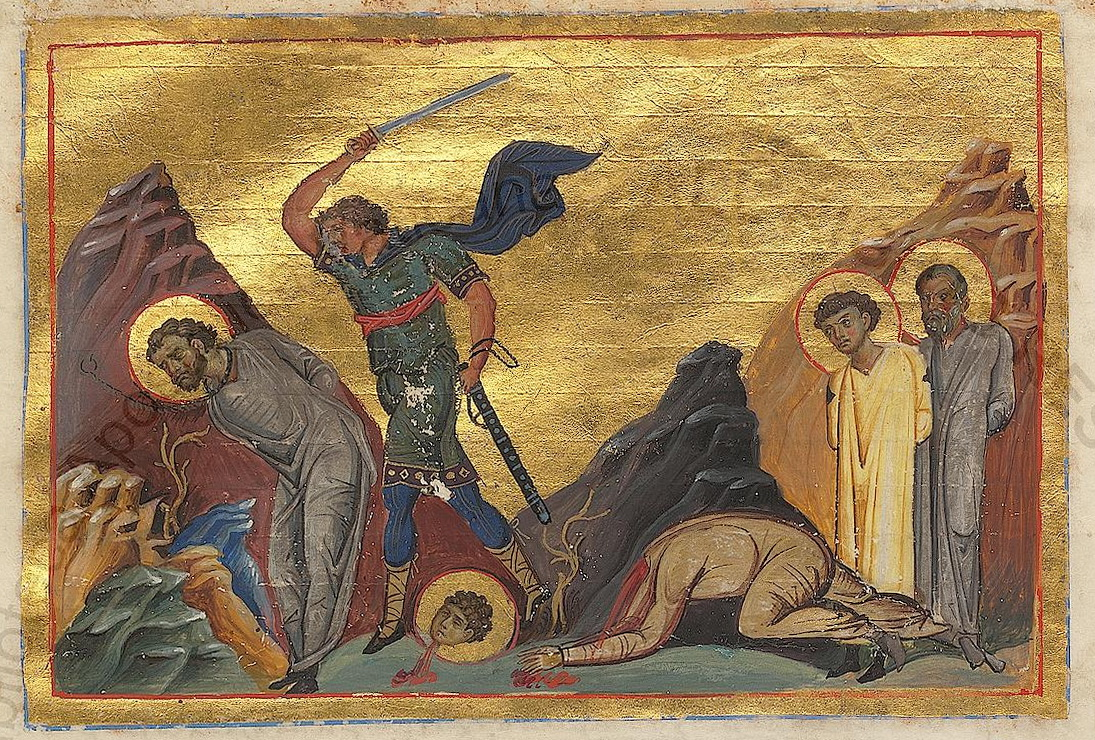
Martyr Alexander and 30 others in Pisidia and Phrygia.
(Menologion of Basil II, 10th century).

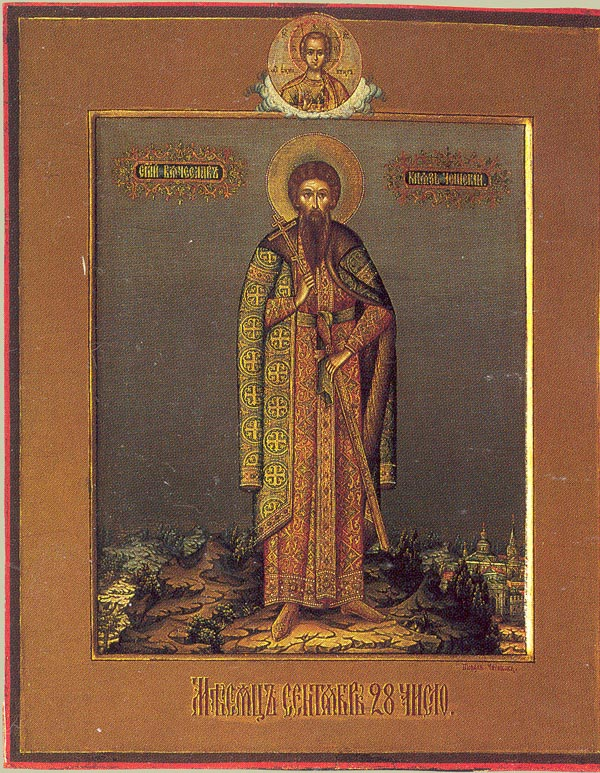
Martyr Wenceslas I of Bohemia (Vyacheslav), Prince of the Czechs.

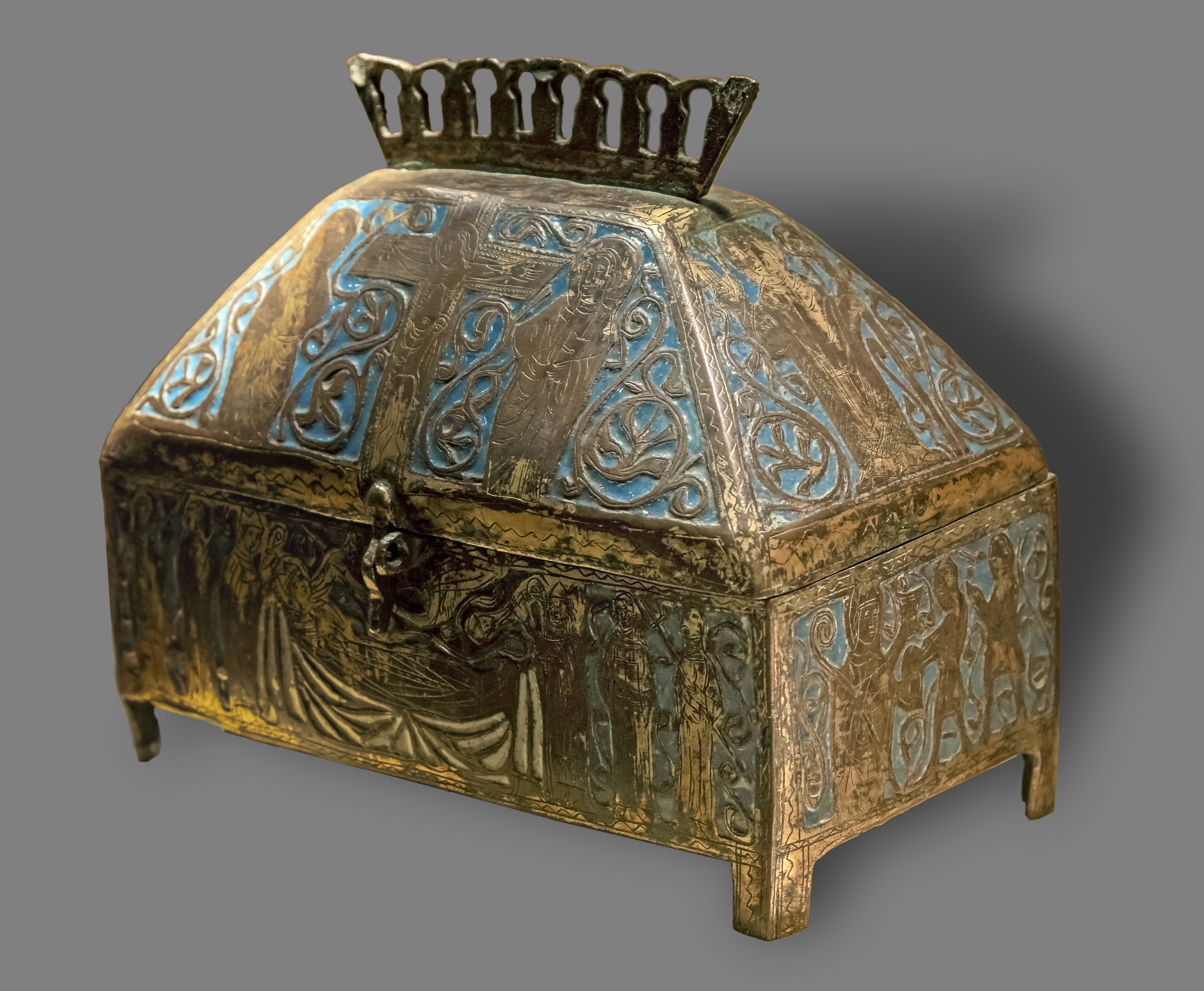
Reliquary of St. Exuperius (Exupère, Soupire), Bishop of Toulouse, Confessor.

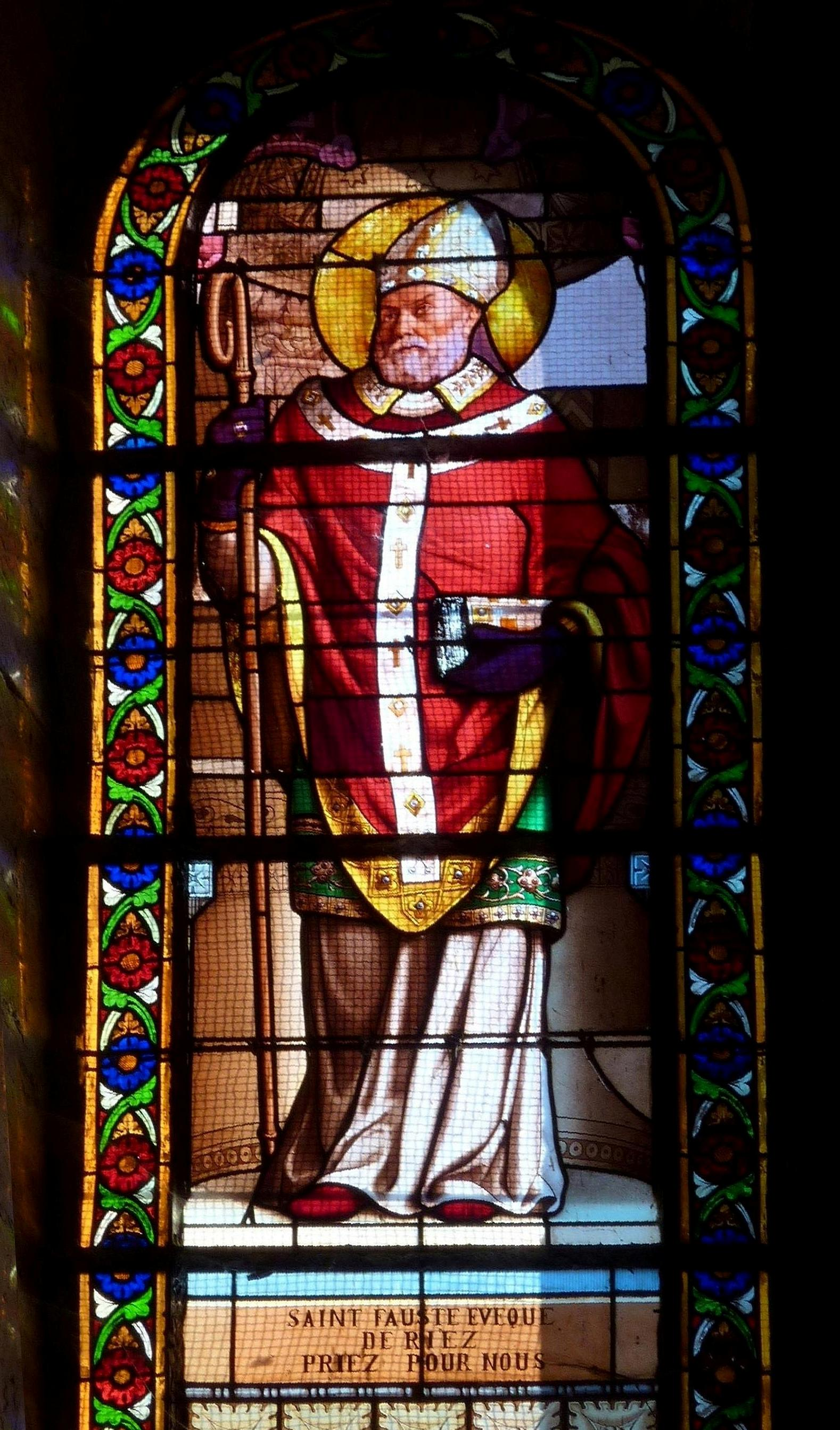
St. Faustus of Riez, Bishop of Riez.

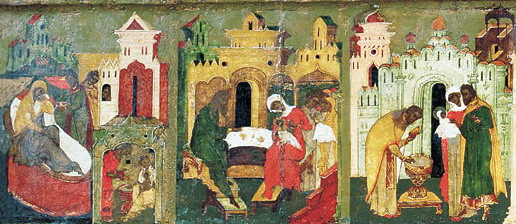
Sts Cyril and Maria, and the infancy of their son St. Sergius of Radonezh.

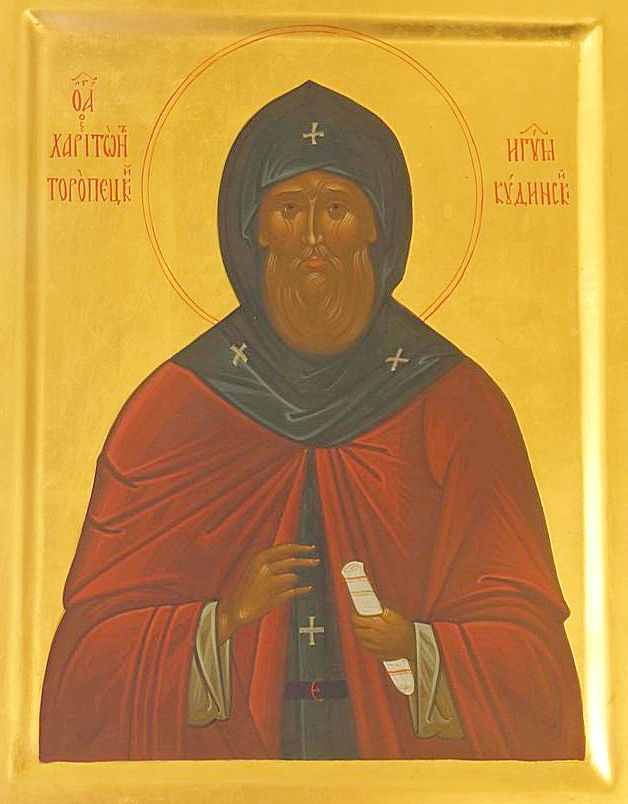
St. Chariton, of Trinity Kudin Monastery.

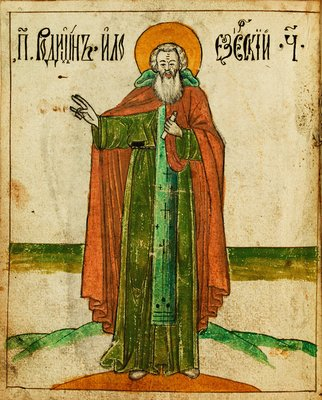
St. Herodion, founder of Iloezersk Monastery.

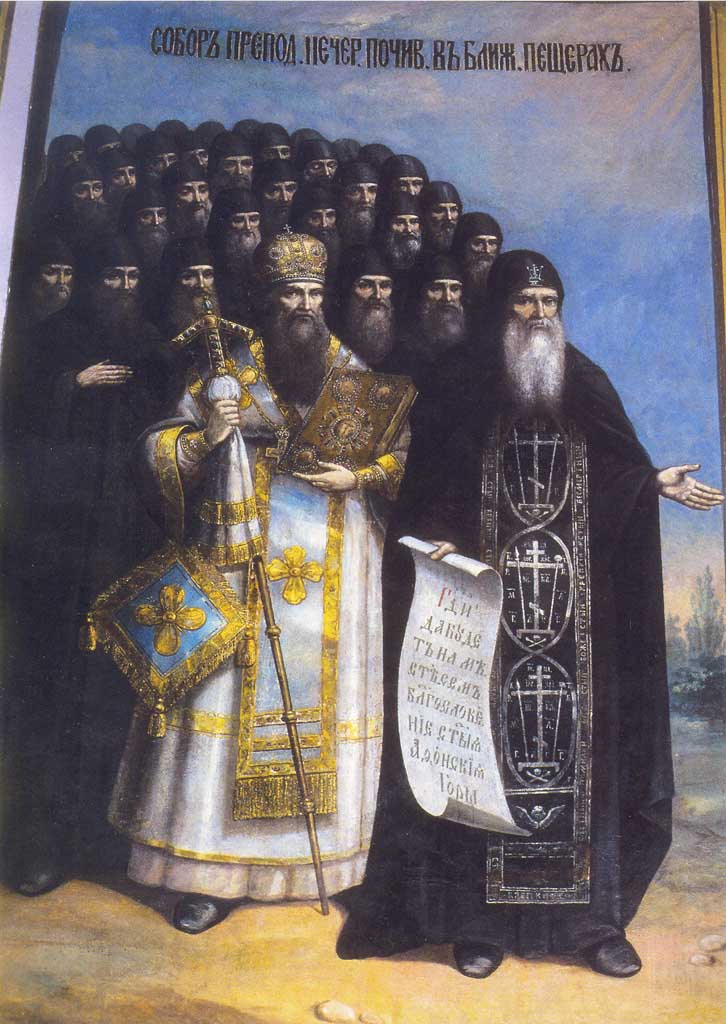
Synaxis of the Holy Fathers of Kiev whose relics lie in the Near Caves of St. Anthony.

== Sources ==
- September 28/October 11. Orthodox Calendar (PRAVOSLAVIE.RU).
- October 11 / September 28. HOLY TRINITY RUSSIAN ORTHODOX CHURCH (A parish of the Patriarchate of Moscow).
- September 28. OCA - The Lives of the Saints.
- The Autonomous Orthodox Metropolia of Western Europe and the Americas (ROCOR). St. Hilarion Calendar of Saints for the year of our Lord 2004. St. Hilarion Press (Austin, TX). p. 72.
- The Twenty-Eighth Day of the Month of September. Orthodoxy in China.
- September 28. Latin Saints of the Orthodox Patriarchate of Rome.
- The Roman Martyrology. Transl. by the Archbishop of Baltimore. Last Edition, According to the Copy Printed at Rome in 1914. Revised Edition, with the Imprimatur of His Eminence Cardinal Gibbons. Baltimore: John Murphy Company, 1916. pp. 299–300.
- Rev. Richard Stanton. A Menology of England and Wales, or, Brief Memorials of the Ancient British and English Saints Arranged According to the Calendar, Together with the Martyrs of the 16th and 17th Centuries. London: Burns & Oates, 1892. pp. 460–462.

Greek Sources

- Great Synaxaristes: (in Greek) 28 ΣΕΠΤΕΜΒΡΙΟΥ. ΜΕΓΑΣ ΣΥΝΑΞΑΡΙΣΤΗΣ.
- (in Greek) Συναξαριστής. 28 Σεπτεμβρίου. ECCLESIA.GR. (H ΕΚΚΛΗΣΙΑ ΤΗΣ ΕΛΛΑΔΟΣ).
- (in Greek) 28/09/2016. Ορθόδοξος Συναξαριστής.

Russian Sources

- (in Russian) 11 октября (28 сентября). Православная Энциклопедия под редакцией Патриарха Московского и всея Руси Кирилла (электронная версия). (Orthodox Encyclopedia - Pravenc.ru).
- (in Russian) 28 сентября по старому стилю / 11 октября по новому стилю. Русская Православная Церковь - Православный церковный календарь на 2016 год.
