= Riez Cathedral =

Roman Catholic church in France

Coordinates: 43°49′6″N 6°5′27″E

Riez Cathedral Cathédrale Notre-Dame-de-l'Assomption de Riez
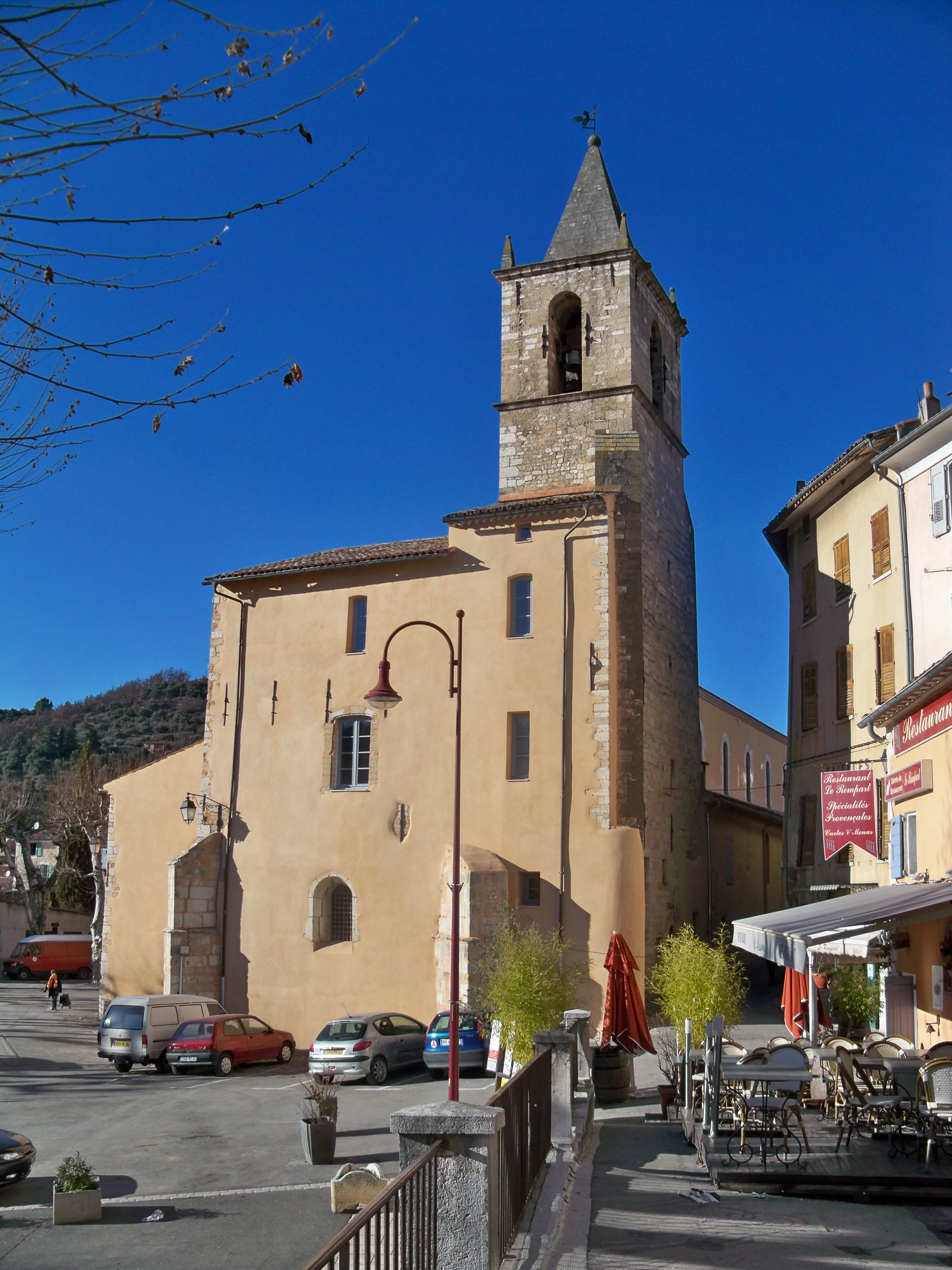
- Riez Cathedral

Religion
- Affiliation: Roman Catholic Church
- Province: Bishopric of Riez
- Region: Alpes-de-Haute-Provence
- Rite: Roman Rite
- Ecclesiastical or organisational status: Cathedral
- Status: Active

Location
- Location: Riez, France
- Interactive map of Riez Cathedral; Cathédrale Notre-Dame-de-l'Assomption de Riez

Architecture
- Type: church

Riez Cathedral (Cathédrale Notre-Dame-de-l'Assomption de Riez) is a Roman Catholic church located in the town of Riez in the département of Alpes-de-Haute-Provence in south-eastern France. It is a national monument.

It was formerly the seat of the Bishopric of Riez, abolished by the Concordat of 1801, which transferred its territory to the Bishopric of Digne.
