= List of senators of Alpes-de-Haute-Provence =

Location of Alpes-de-Haute-Provence in France

Following is a list of senators of Alpes-de-Haute-Provence, people who have represented the department of Alpes-de-Haute-Provence in the Senate of France. The department was created as Nord-de-Provence on 4 March 1790, subsequently renamed Haute-Provence and then Basses-Alpes. The department of Basses-Alpes was renamed Alpes-de-Haute-Provence on 13 April 1970.

== Third Republic ==
Senators for Basses-Alpes under the French Third Republic were:

- Césaire du Chaffaut (1876–1884)
- Joseph Eugène Michel (1876–1885)
- Jean-Baptiste Bouteille (1885–1893)
- Marius Soustre (1885–1897)
- Léonard Richaud (1894–1895)
- Lazare Fruchier (1895–1903)
- César Allemand (1897–1903)
- Louis Andrieux (1903)
- Hippolyte Gassier (1903–1907)
- Adolphe Defarge (1903–1910)
- Camille Pelissier (1907–1912)
- Henri Michel (1910–1921)
- Justin Perchot (1912–1911)
- André Honnorat (1921–1945)
- Pierre de Courtois (1930–1945)

== Fourth Republic ==
Senators for Basses-Alpes under the French Fourth Republic were:

Term	Name	Group
1946–1948	Paul Jouve	Socialiste
1948–1959	Émile Aubert	Socialiste

== Fifth Republic ==
Senators for Basses-Alpes and then Alpes-de-Haute-Provence under the French Fifth Republic:

Term	Name	Group	Notes
1959–1969	Émile Aubert	Socialiste	Died 22 August 1969
1969–1980	Maxime Javelly	Socialiste	Replaced Émile Aubert on 23 August 1969
1980–1998	Fernand Tardy	Socialiste	
1998–2014	Claude Domeizel	Socialiste et apparentés	
2014–present	Jean-Yves Roux	Socialiste et républicain	

== Sources ==
- Liste des anciens sénateurs de la IIIème République par circonscription (in French), Sénat de France
- Liste des anciens sénateurs de la IVème République par circonscription (in French), Sénat de France
- Liste des anciens sénateurs de la Vème République par circonscription (in French), Sénat de France
- Liste des anciens sénateurs de la Vème République par circonscription: Basse-Alpres (in French), Sénat de France
- Liste par département – Alpes-de-Haute-Provence (in French), Sénat de France

Senators of the Alpes-de-Haute-Provence department of France.
