= Alemannia (disambiguation) =

Alamannia or Alemannia was the territory inhabited by the Germanic Alemanni peoples 3rd century–911. "Alemannia" and similar spellings, is an exonym for Germany used in many other languages.

Alemannia or Alamannia may also refer to:

== German sports teams ==
- Alemannia Aachen
- Alemannia Haibach
- Berliner FC Alemannia 1890
- BFC Alemannia 22
- FC Alemannia 1897 Karlsruhe
- SV Alemannia Waldalgesheim

== Other uses ==
- 418 Alemannia, an asteroid

== See also ==
- Alemanni, a confederation of Germanic tribes
- Alamanni (surname)
- Alamania, a species of orchids
- Alemannic (disambiguation)
- Swabia, a cultural, historic and linguistic region in southwestern Germany
