= Allemand (surname) =

Allemand is a French surname meaning "German". Notable people with the surname include:

- César Allemand (1846–1918), French doctor and politician
- Gia Allemand (1983–2013), American model
- Jean-Pierre Allemand (born 1942), French fencer
- Julie Allemand (born 1996) Belgian basketball player
- Pierre Allemand, (1662–1691), French seaman and trader in New France
- Prosper Allemand (1815–1901), French doctor and politician
- Romain Allemand (born 2006), French snowboarder
- Zacharie Allemand (1762–1826), French admiral
