= César Allemand =

Prosper François César Allemand

Senator of Basses-Alpes
- In office 4 July 1897 – 3 January 1903
- Preceded by: Marius Soustre
- Succeeded by: Louis Andrieux (invalidated); Hippolyte Gassier

Personal details
- Born: 10 June 1846 Riez, Basses-Alpes, France
- Died: 27 January 1918 (aged 71) Allemagne-en-Provence, Basses-Alpes, France
- Occupation: Doctor, politician

Prosper François César Allemand (10 June 1846 – 27 January 1918) was a French medical doctor and politician who was Senator of Basses-Alpes from 1897 to 1903.

== Early years ==
Prosper François César Allemand was born on 10 June 1846 in Riez, Basses-Alpes. His parents were Prosper Allemand (1815–1901) and Noëlie Elisabeth Reydellet (born 1824). His father was a doctor who represented Basses-Alpes in the 1871 National Assembly and was Deputy of Digne, Basses-Alpes in 1876. César Allemand also studied medicine.

== Politician ==
Allemand entered politics during the municipal elections of 11 June 1879, when he became mayor of Riez, holding office until 1901. He then became a general councilor of Basses-Alpes.

On 4 July 1897 Allemand was elected Senator of Basses-Alpes in a by-election to replace Marius Soustre, who had died. He sat with the Republican Left group. He did not participate in debates, but was a member of various committees. Allemand was a friend of Joseph Reinach and a supporter of Alfred Dreyfus. In the 1903 elections for the triennial renewal of the Senate he won only 58 votes against 211 for Louis Andrieux, who was elected. Andrieux's election was invalidated, and he was replaced by Hippolyte Gassier.

Allemand retired to his family property, the Château de Beauvezer in Allemagne-en-Provence, Basses-Alpes. He died there on 27 January 1918.

== Sources ==
- Amiel, Maxime (March 2003), "La répression de la résistance au coup d'Etat de 1851 (dans la région de Riez)", Bulletin d'Information des Amis du Vieux Riez (in French) (88)
- Bernard, Eric, "Prosper François César ALLEMAND", Geneanet (in French)
- Jolly, Jean, ed. (1960), "ALLEMAND (PROSPER, FRANÇOIS, CÉSAR)", Dictionnaire des parlementaires français de 1889 à 1940, Presses universitaires de France
