= Prosper Allemand =

French doctor and politician (1815–1901)

Pierre Léger Prosper Allemand
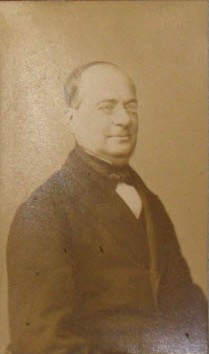
- Allemand near 1871

Representative of Basses-Alpes
- In office 2 July 1871 – 7 March 1876

Deputy of Basses-Alpes (Digne)
- In office 20 February 1876 – 14 October 1881

Personal details
- Born: 16 July 1815 Allemagne, Basses-Alpes, France
- Died: 3 March 1901 (aged 85) Allemagne, Basses-Alpes, France
- Occupation: Doctor, politician

Pierre Léger Prosper Allemand (16 July 1815 – 3 March 1901) was a French medical doctor and politician, a strong opponent of the government during the Second French Empire, who was Deputy of Basses-Alpes from 1871 to 1881 during the French Third Republic.

== Early years ==
Pierre Léger Prosper Allemand was born on 16 July 1815 in Allemagne, Basses-Alpes (now Alpes-de-Haute-Provence). His parents were Jean François Allemand (1775–1836), a health officer and mayor, and Marie Élisabeth Poitevin. He was received as a doctor in 1841, and was named internal head of the Toulon civil hospitals. On 15 August 1845 in Riez he married Noëlie Élisabeth Reydellet (born 1824). Their son was César Allemand (1846–1918).

Allemand joined in the rebellion against the coup d'état of 2 December 1851, along with Charles Cotte and Marius Soustre. He was included in the list of deportees to Algeria, as was his relative Marius Allemand. However, the punishment appears to have been reduced to travel restrictions, and on 4 May 1852 the sub-prefect of Brignoles authorised Allemand to circulate throughout that canton and the neighboring cantons. On 14 July 1860 Allemand was elected to the municipal council of Riez, Basses-Alpes. The next year he ran for election as General Councilor, and was elected with almost two thirds of the votes despite official support for his opponent. He became mayor of the commune of Riez.

== Deputy ==
Allemand was elected to the National Assembly as Representative of Basses-Alpes in the by-election of 2 July 1871 in place of Adolphe Thiers, who had chosen to represent the Seine department. (Note: In the 1871 election some candidates, such as Thiers, ran in several departments. If elected in more than one, they chose which department they would represent and by-elections were held in the others.) Allemand won 14,212 votes against 7,412 for Paulin Talabot and 3,755 for Arthur Picard. He joined both the Moderate Left and the Republican Union groups. He did not participate in the debates. He voted against the preliminary steps for peace with Prussia, against public prayers, for the return of the government to Paris, against the Cabinet of 24 May 1873 (which dismissed him from his position as Mayor of Riez), for the constitutional laws and against the "freedom of higher education" law.

Allemand ran for election as Senator of Basses-Alpes on 30 January 1876 but was not elected. He ran for the Chamber of Deputies on 20 February 1876 for the Digne constituency and won by 7,643 votes against 2,953 for the Bonapartist Falcon de Cimier. He rejoined the left and supported the liberal ministries appointed by Marshal MacMahon. After the 16 May 1877 crisis he was one of the 363 opponents of the Fourtou-de Broglie cabinet. He was reelected Deputy for Digne on 14 October 1877 by 7,757 votes against 3,590 votes for the official candidate M. Fruchier. He voted for the partial amnesty, for invalidation of the election of Louis Auguste Blanqui, for application of existing laws to unauthorized congregations and for divorce. He did not run for reelection on 21 August 1881.

== Last years ==
Allemand left office on 14 October 1881. He was named Chevalier of the Legion of Honour in December 1882. In 1898 he wrote a celebrated letter supporting Joseph Reinach, the champion of Alfred Dreyfus. He died on 3 March 1901 in Allemagne, Basses-Alpes, aged 85. On 6 September 1909 Aristide Briand presided over the inauguration of a bust of Allemand in Allemagne-en-Provence by Jeanne Royannez^{(fr)}, wife of Clovis Hugues. Reinach spoke at the ceremony. The bust was melted down by the German occupiers in 1942.

== Sources ==
- "ALLEMAND D' Pierre Léger Prosper", Léonore (in French), Ministry of Culture
- Amayenc, Michel, "Pierre Léger Prosper ALLEMAND", Geneanet (in French)
- Amiel, Maxime (March 2003), "La répression de la résistance au coup d'Etat de 1851 (dans la région de Riez)", Bulletin d'Information des Amis du Vieux Riez (in French) (88): 1–24
- Blanchard-Gaillard, Suzanne (July 1998), "Un insurgé oublié : Marius Soustre (Digne, 1828-1897)", Bulletin de l'Association 1851-2001 (in French) (2)
- Cahm, Eric (2014-07-15), The Dreyfus Affair in French Society and Politics, Taylor & Francis, ISBN 978-1-317-88945-8
- Duprat, Pascal (1852), Les tables de proscription de Louis Bonaparte et de ses complices (in French), Redouté
- Joannet, H. (2007), Les Basses-Alpes, Mémoire en images (in French), A. Sutton, ISBN 978-2-84910-654-9
- Pierre Allemand (in French), Assemblée nationale
- Robert, Adolphe; Cougny, Gaston (1889–1891), "ALLEMAND (PIERRE-LEGER-PROSPER)", in Edgar Bourloton (ed.), Dictionnaire des Parlementaires français (1789–1889) (in French)
