= Allemand =

Allemand may refer to:

- Allemand (surname)
- The French language name for the German language and Germans
- Elbling, a German wine grape that is also known as Allemand

== See also ==
- Allemande, an instrumental dance form in Baroque music or a movement in square dancing
