= Joseph Eugène Michel =

French lawyer and politician

Representative of Basses-Alpes
- In office 8 February 1871 – 7 March 1876

Senator of Basses-Alpes
- In office 30 January 1876 – 24 January 1885
- Succeeded by: Jean-Baptiste Bouteille; Marius Soustre

Personal details
- Born: 23 July 1821 Seyne, Basses-Alpes, France
- Died: 13 March 1885 (aged 63) Digne-les-Bains, Basses-Alpes, France
- Occupation: Lawyer, politician

Joseph Eugène Michel (23 July 1821 – 13 March 1885) was a French lawyer and politician who was Representative and then Senator of Basses-Alpes between 1871 and 1995.

== Early years ==
Eugène Michel was born on 23 July 1821 in Seyne, Basses-Alpes (now Alpes-de-Haute-Provence). He studied law, and registered at the bar in Digne. He entered politics at the start of the French Third Republic when he ran for election on 8 February 1871 as representative for Basses-Alpes in the National Assembly.

== Deputy ==
Michel won election by 15,996 votes out of 25,739 voters. He sat with the center left, but did not always vote with this group. He then joined the Lavergne^{(fr)} group. Michel voted for peace with Prussia and against repeal of the laws of exile. He abstained from voting on the petition of the bishops and on the resignation of Adolphe Thiers. He voted for the septennat, for the ministry of Albert de Broglie, for the Walloon amendment and for the constitutional laws. He left office on 7 March 1876. Michel was a member of the general council for the canton of Seyne and president of this council.

== Senator ==
Michel was a Senator of Basses-Alpes from 30 January 1876 to 24 January 1885. he was elected by 196 votes out of 326 voters. He sat with the constitutional group, which often voted with the right. He voted for the dissolution of the Chamber of Deputies requested by the de Broglie ministry. However, after the 16 May 1877 crisis he opposed to the new cabinet. In July 1883 he fought Article 7 of the Judicial Reform Bill to abolish a number of courts. He failed to be reelected in the triennial renewal of the Senate on 6 January 1885, winning only 151 votes out of 439 voters.

Michel died on 13 March 1885 in Digne-les-Bains, Basses-Alpes.

== Sources ==
- Eugène Michel (in French), Assemblée nationale
- Le Figaro (1876), "Eugène Michel", Sénateurs et Députés: silhouettes à la plume (in French), au Journal Le Figaro
- Robert, Adolphe; Cougny, Gaston (1889–1891), "MICHEL (JOSEPH-EUGÈNE)", in Edgar Bourloton (ed.), Dictionnaire des Parlementaires français (1789–1889) (in French)
