= Césaire du Chaffaut =

French politician

Césaire Léon Amaudric du Chaffaut
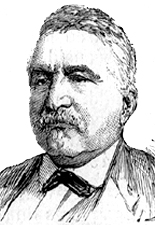

Representative of Alpes-de-Haute-Provence

Senator of Alpes-de-Haute-Provence
- In office 30 January 1876 – 6 June 1884 (died)
- Succeeded by: Jean-Baptiste Bouteille; Marius Soustre

Personal details
- Born: 19 May 1822 Digne, Basses Alpes, France
- Died: 6 June 1884 (aged 62) Digne, Basses Alpes, France
- Occupation: Politician

Césaire Léon Amaudric du Chaffaut (19 May 1822 – 6 June 1884) was a French politician who was a member of the National Assembly and then a Senator from 1876 until his death.

== Family ==
Césaire Léon Amaudric du Chaffaut was born on 19 May 1822 in Digne, Basses Alpes (now called Alpes-de-Haute-Provence). His parents were Jean Paul Jules Félicité Amaudric du Chaffaut (1798–1868), a prefectural councilor in 1843, and Thérèse Julie Olimpe de Perrin de Junquières (1798–1862). His father was a moderate Republican member of the National Constituent Assembly during the French Second Republic from 23 April 1848 to 26 May 1849. On 25 June 1849 Césaire du Chaffaut married Thérèse Zénobie Pellisier (1828–1911). They had fourteen children, including Albertine Thérèse (1852–1906), Jules Joseph (1853–1908), Melchior (1861–1932), Thérèse Jeanne (1864–1956) and Joseph (1870–1947).

Du Chaffaut entered the administration and was secretary general of the Bassonistes in 1848. He did not serve in any public office during the Second French Empire (1852–70). On his father's death he inherited the title of "Comte du Chaffaut".

== National politics ==
On 8 February 1871 du Chaffaut was elected Representative of Basses Alpes in the National Assembly by 14,273 votes out of 25,739. He sat with the Centre gauche (center left) parliamentary group, but several times voted with the right. He voted for the peace treaty with Prussia, for repeal of the laws of exile, for the constituent power of the Assembly, for the decree against civil burials civil, for the septennat, for the ministry of Albert de Broglie, for the proposal of Jean Casimir-Perier, for the amendment of Henri-Alexandre Wallon, for the constitutional laws, against return of the Assembly to Paris, against dissolution of the Assembly and against the Pascal Pierre Duprat amendment, He abstained from votes on public prayers and the resignation of Adolphe Thiers.

Du Chaffaut was elected to the Senate for Basses Alpes on 30 January 1876 and held office until his death in 1884. He was elected by 193 votes out of 329. He sat with the constitutional center, voted for the dissolution of the chamber proposed in June 1877 by the Broglie-Fourtou cabinet, and generally voted with the right. He also represented the canton of Senez in the Basses-Alpes General Council. Amaudric du Chaffaut died in Digne, Basses Alpes, on 6 June 1884.

== Sources ==
- Borel d'Hauterive, ed. (1885), Annuaire de la noblesse de France et des maisons souveraines de l'Europe, Bureau de la publication
- du CHAFFAULT Césaire (in French), Sénat de France
- Garric, Alain, "Césaire Léon AMAUDRIC DU CHAFFAUT", Geneanet (in French)
- Jean-Paul, Jules, Félicité du Chaffault (in French), Assemblée nationale
- Robert, Adolphe; Cougny, Gaston (1889–1891), "DU CHAFFAULT (CÉSAIRE-LÈON-AMAUDRIC, COMTE)", in Edgar Bourloton (ed.), Dictionnaire des Parlementaires français (1789–1889) (in French)
- Vapereau, Gustave (1880), "Du Chaffaut (Césaire-Léon Amaudric, comte)", Dictionnaire universel des contemporains ... (in French), Hachette et cie
