= Jean-Baptiste Bouteille =

French lawyer (1825–1893)

Oswald Jean-Baptiste Michel Augustin Bouteille
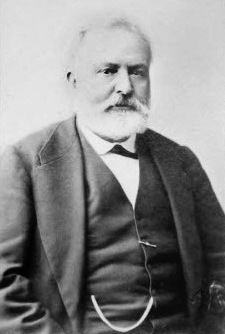

Deputy of Basses-Alpes
- In office 5 March 1876 – 5 February 1885

Senator of Basses-Alpes
- In office 25 January 1885 – 21 July 1893
- Preceded by: Césaire du Chaffaut; Joseph Eugène Michel

Personal details
- Born: 13 November 1825 Manosque, Basses-Alpes, France
- Died: 21 July 1893 (aged 67) Manosque, Basses-Alpes, France
- Occupation: Lawyer, politician

Oswald Jean-Baptiste Michel Augustin Bouteille (13 November 1825 – 21 July 1893) was a French lawyer and politician who was a Deputy of Basses-Alpes from 1876 to 1881, and Senator of Basses-Alpes from 1885 to 1893.

== Birth and early career ==
Oswald Jean-Baptiste Michel Augustin Bouteille was born on 13 November 1825 in Manosque, Basses-Alpes (now called Alpes-de-Haute-Provence). He became an advocate in Manosque. During the Second French Empire he was appointed mayor of Manosque and was elected to the Basses-Alpes General Council, where he was vice-president. During the French Third Republic his first attempt to be elected to the senate was defeated.

== Deputy ==
On 5 March 1876 Bouteille was elected Deputy of Basses-Alpes for the Forcalquier constituency by 4,339 votes against 4,329 for his Conservative opponent, M. de Salve. He sat with the moderate left, and was one of the 363. He was reelected on 14 October 1877 by 4,909 votes against 4,486 for M. de Salve, the government candidate. He voted with the Opportunist Republicans, votes against invalidating the deputies of the right, for Article 7, for application of the existing laws of congregations, for the partial amnesty, for invalidation of the elections of Louis Auguste Blanqui and for divorce. He was reelected on 21 August 1881 by 6,050 votes out of 6,400. He supported the policy of Jules Ferry, approved the Tonkin Campaign and rejected repeal of the Concordat of 1801. He left office on 5 February 1885.

== Senator ==
Bouteille was Senator of Basses-Alpes from 25 January 1885 to 21 July 1893. He was elected in the 1885 triennial renewal of the Senate as the second of two senators for Basses-Alpes by 254 votes against 151 for Joseph Eugène Michel, the outgoing senator. He sat with the majority in the Senate, voted for the new military law, and in 1889 spoke for reinstatement of the uninomial ballot, for the draft Lisbonne law restricting freedom of the press and for the process to be followed against General Boulanger. From 1889 to 1893 he belonged to several committees, but did not make any speeches in the Senate. Jean-Baptiste Bouteille died in office on 21 July 1893 in Manosque, Basses-Alpes.

== Sources ==
- Jolly, Jean, ed. (1960), "BOUTEILLE (JEAN-BAPTISTE, MICHEL, AUGUSTIN, OSWALD)", Dictionnaire des parlementaires français de 1889 à 1940, Presses universitaires de France
- Oswald, Jean-Baptiste, Michel, Augustin Bouteille (in French), Assemblée nationale
- Robert, Adolphe; Cougny, Gaston (1889–1891), "BOUTEILLE (JEAN-BAPTISTE-MICHEL-AUGUSTIN-OSWALD)", in Edgar Bourloton (ed.), Dictionnaire des Parlementaires français (1789–1889) (in French)
