= Marius Soustre =

French lawyer and politician

Lazare Marius Arthur Soustre
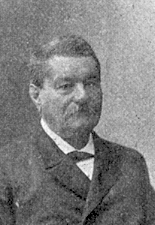

Deputy of Basses-Alpes
- In office 21 August 1881 to – 5 February 1885

Senator of Basses-Alpes
- In office 25 January 1885 – 16 April 1897
- Preceded by: Césaire du Chaffaut; Joseph Eugène Michel
- Succeeded by: César Allemand

Personal details
- Born: 1 September 1828 Digne, Basses-Alpes, France
- Died: 16 April 1897 (aged 68) Digne, Basse-Alpes, France
- Occupation: Lawyer, politician

Lazare Marius Arthur Soustre (1 September 1828 – 16 April 1897) was a French lawyer and committed Republican who was imprisoned for his resistance to the coup that brought Napoleon III to power. During the French Third Republic he was Deputy and then Senator for Basses-Alpes from 1881 to 1897.

== Early years ==
Marius Arthur Soustre was born on 1 September 1828 in Digne, Basses-Alpes (now Alpes-de-Haute-Provence. His parents were Charles Benoit Soustre (born 1800), an Inspector of Registration and Domains, and Marie Anne-Lazarine Aillaud (1808–1829).

During the French Second Republic (1848–51) he demonstrated against the July government, showing strong Republican opinions. Soustre became an advocate. He joined in the rebellion against the coup d'état of 2 December 1951, along with Charles Cotte and Prosper Allemand. For health reasons he avoided deportation to Cayenne or Algeria, but was exiled and imprisoned in Toulouse. The committee that ordered his imprisonment said, "There is no doubt that he is the leaders of the Digne Secret Society ... Wherever he is, he will pervert the workers with whom he will be in contact."

Soustre was released with the amnesty of 1859. He was forty-eight when the French Third Republic was declared on 4 September 1870. On 10 September 1870 a provisional departmental committee was established in Digne with Charles Cotte, lawyer, as president and Marius Soustre, propriétaire, as secretary. Soustre was attached to the cabinet of the Prefect of Basses-Alpes, and assisted the prefects Esménard du Hazet and Casimir Bontour. He campaigned for democracy in the Digne constituency and was elected general councilor. He helped create electoral committees in each commune. On 9 January 1881 he was elected mayor of Digne, a position he held until his death in 1897.

== National politics ==
On 21 August 1881 Soustre ran for election to the National Assembly for the Digne constituency of Basses-Alpes on the Republican Union platform. He was elected by 7,501 votes against 2,733 for the radical candidate, M. Proal. He sat with the Opportunist Republicans majority. He voted for credits for the Tonkin Campaign, against the separation of church and state, and for the school laws. His term ended on 5 February 1885.

On 25 January 1885 Soustre was elected to the Senate for Besses-Alpes in the triennial renewal by 356 out of 439 votes. He sat with the Republican majority, and did not speak. He voted on 13 February 1889 for reinstatement of the single-name ballot. He voted for the draft Lisbonne law restricting freedom of the press, and for high court proceedings against General Boulanger. Soustre supported all measures for the defense of the Republic. He was reelected on 7 January 1894 in the first round by 245 votes out of 421.

Soustre died suddenly in Digne on 16 April 1897 at the age of 69. In September 1900 the French League for the Defense of the Rights of Man and the Citizen decided to launch a public subscription to erect a bust to Marius Soustre. The bust, by sculptor Julien Lorieux, stands in the public gardens of Digne-les-Bains.

== Sources ==
- Assemblée nationale (1875), Enquete Parlementaire Sur Les Actes Du Gouvernement de la Defense Nationale (in French)
- Blanchard-Gaillard, Suzanne (July 1998), "Un insurgé oublié : Marius Soustre (Digne, 1828-1897)", Bulletin de l'Association 1851-2001 (in French) (2)
- Fonds Debuisson, "Monument à Marius Soustre – Digne-les-Bains", E-monumen (in French)
- Jolly, Jean, ed. (1960), "SOUSTRE (LAZARE, Marius)", Dictionnaire des parlementaires français de 1889 à 1940, Presses universitaires de France
- Marius, Arthur Soustre (in French), Assemblée nationale
- Pierfit, "Lazare Marius SOUSTRE", Geneanet (in French)
- Robert, Adolphe; Cougny, Gaston (1889–1891), "SOUSTRE (MARIUS-ARTHUR)", in Edgar Bourloton (ed.), Dictionnaire des Parlementaires français (1789–1889) (in French)
