= Robert Céneau =

Robert Céneau (1483 – 7 April 1560) was a French bishop, historian, and controversialist.

He was born in Paris. In 1513 he became doctor of the Faculty of Theology in the Sorbonne, and in 1515 was made Bishop of Vence. From here he was transferred in 1530 to the See of Riez, and in 1532 to that of Avranches.

He took an active part in the religious and polemical discussions that attended the Protestant Reformation.

== Works ==
He wrote several controversial works, the most important of which are:

- "Pro tuendo sacro coelibatu" (Paris, 1545)
- "Tractatus de utriusque gladii facultate, usuque legitimo" (Paris, 1546, and Leyden, 1558)
- "Axioma de divortio matrimonii mosaici per legem evangelicam refutato" (Paris, 1549)
- "Traductatis Calviniacae" (Paris, 1556)
- "Methodus de compescendâ haereticorum ferociâ" (Paris, 1557).

In the same year and place in which the last-named work was published, there appeared his Historia Galliae, dedicated to Henry II of France. This was a folio volume, treating of the name, origin, and achievements of the Gauls, Franks, and Burgundians. It has but little critical value. Not long afterward he produced "L'histoire ecclésiastique de Normandie". While Bishop of Riez he issued synodal statutes of that diocese, and wrote a treatise on weights and measures under the title: "De liquidorum leguminumque mensuris, seu verâ mensurarum ponderumque ratione" (Paris, 1532, 1535, 1547).
