= Camille Pelissier =

French lawyer and politician

Camille Pelissier (29 August 1859 – 28 September 1943) was a French politician.

He was born in Forcalquier (Alpes-de-Haute-Provence, France. He was a lawyer, a member of the general council, and a senator for Basses-Alpes between 1907 and 1912. He was active in discussing topics relevant to his department. He died in Marseille Bouches-du-Rhône, France.

== Sources ==
- Jean Jolly (dir.), Dictionnaire des parlementaires français, Presses universitaires de France
