= Roman Catholic Diocese of Riez =

Coordinates: 43.82°N 6.09°E

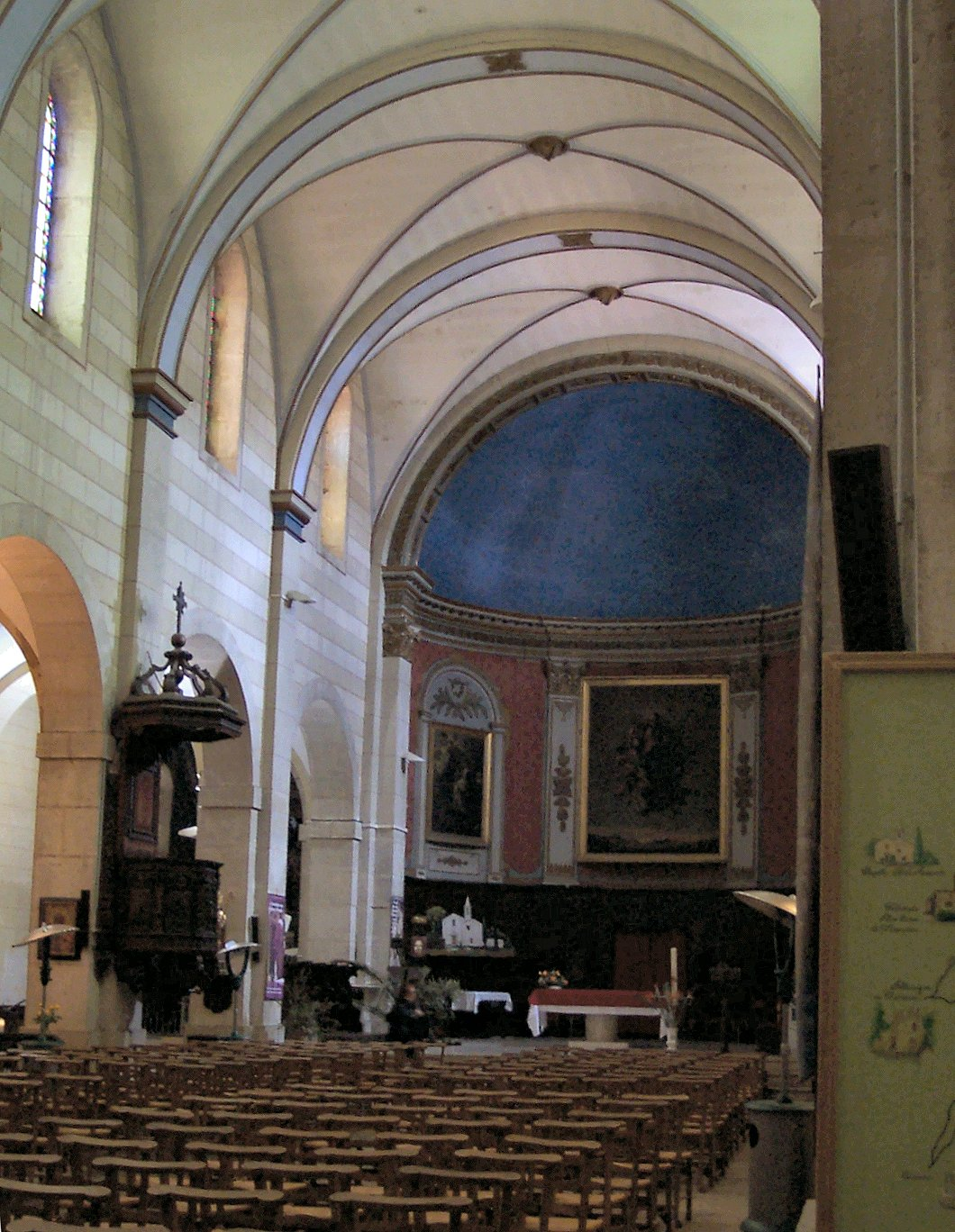
Interior of Riez Cathedral

The former French Catholic diocese of Riez existed at least from fifth century Gaul to the French Revolution. Its see was at Riez, in the modern department of Alpes-de-Haute-Provence.

== History ==
According to an unsupported tradition, the establishment of the Church in this diocese is attributed to the first century and to Eusebius of Eudochius, companion of Lazarus, who had been raised from the dead by Christ himself. A certain Prosper of Reggio of Reggio in Emilia (at the beginning of the fifth century) figures in the history of Riez and was perhaps its bishop.

The first certainly known bishop of Riez is Maximus (433–60), who succeeded Honoratus as Abbot of Lérins and who, in November 439, held a synod at Riez with a view to regularizing the situation of the churches of Southern Gaul, particularly the competing ambitions of the metropolitans of Embrun and Arles. The synod was presided over by Archbishop Hilary of Arles.

His successor, Faustus of Riez (461–93), also Abbot of Lérins, was noted for his writings against Predestinationists; it was to him that Sidonius Apollinaris dedicated his "Carmen Eucharisticum" in gratitude for hospitality received at Riez.

Robert Ceneau, the pulpit orator (1530–32), afterwards Bishop of Avranches, and Cardinal Guido Bentivoglio (1622–25), who was nuncio in France and defender of French interests at Rome, were bishops there.

In 1693 the number of residents in Riez was approximately 6,000, many of whom were Protestants. They were all subjects of the temporal power of the Bishop of Riez. The entire diocese contained 52 named localities, and 60 parishes (including 5 rural priories). In 1751, 3,000 faithful Christians (Catholics) are reported, and the diocese contained 54 parishes.

== Bishops ==
=== To 1000 ===
- Maximus (434–460)
- Faustus of Riez (461–495?)

[Didymus (510?)]

- Contumeliosus of Riez (c. 518–533)
- Faustus (II.) (549)
- Emeterius (554)
- Claudianus (573)
- Urbicus (584–600?)
- Claudius (630?–650?)
- Archinric (seventh century)
- Absalon (late seventh century)
- Anthimius (700?)
- Riculfe (789?)
- Rostan (820?)
- Bernaire (840?)
- Rudolf (850?)
- Edoldus (879)
- Gerard (936)
- Almerade (c. 990 – c. 1030?)

=== 1000–1300 ===
- Bertrand (1040–1060?)
- Agelric (1060?)
- Henri (I.) (1094)
- Augier (1096–1139?)
- Fouques (1140)
- Pierre Giraud (1145–1156)
- Henri (II.) (1167–1180)
- Aldebert de Gaubert (1180–1191)
- Bertrand Garcin (1191–1192)
- Imbert (1192–1201?)
- Hugues Raimond (1202–1223)
- Rostan de Sabran (1224–1240)
- Fouques de Caille (1240–1273)
- Mathieu de Lusarches (1273–1288)
- Pierre de Négrel (1288–1306)

=== 1300–1500 ===
- Pierre de Gantelmi (1306–1317)
- Gaillard Saumate (1317)

Gaillard de Preissac (1318) (Gaillard de Preyssac)

- Pierre des Prés (1318)
- Rossolin (1319–1329)
- Bernard d'Étienne (1329–1330)
- Arnaud Sabatier (1330–1334)
- Geffroi Isnard (1334–1348)
- Jean Joffrevi (1348–1352)
- Pierre Fabri (I.) (1352–1369)
- Jean de Maillac, O.Min. (1370–1396)
- Guillaume Fabri (1396–1413)
- Pierre Fabri II. (1413–1416?)
- Michel de Bouliers (I.) (1416–1441)
- Michel de Bouliers (II.) (1442–1450)
- Robert (1450) (Bishop-elect)
- Jean Fassi (1450–1463)
- Marc Lascaris de Tende (1463–1490)
- Antoine Lascaris de Tende (1490–1523)

=== 1500-suppression ===
- Thomas Lascaris de Tende (1523–1526)
- Cardinal Christophe Numalius (Numai) (1526–1527) (Administrator)
- François de Dinteville (1527–1530)
- Robert Cénalis (1530–1532)
- Antoine Lascaris de Tende (1532–1546) (second appointment)
- Louis de Bouliers (1546–1550) (Bishop-elect)
- Lancelot de Carle (1550–1568)

Sede Vacante (1568–1572)

- André d'Ormson (1572–1577) (Bishop-elect)
- Elzéar de Rastel (1577–1597)
- Charles de Saint-Sixte (1599–1614)
- Guillaume Aleaume (1615–1622)
- Cardinal Guido Bentivoglio d'Aragona (1622–1625)
- François de la Fare, O.Minim. (1625–1628)
- Louis Doni d'Attichy (1629–1652)
- Nicolas de Valavoire (1652–1685)
- Jacques Desmarets (1693–1713)
- Balthasar Phelipeaux (1713–1751)
- François de la Tour du Pin (1751–1772)
- François de Clugny (1772–1801)

== See also ==
- Catholic Church in France
- List of Catholic dioceses in France

== Bibliography ==
=== Sources ===
- Gams, Pius Bonifatius (1873). Series episcoporum Ecclesiae catholicae: quotquot innotuerunt a beato Petro apostolo. Ratisbon: Typis et Sumptibus Georgii Josephi Manz. pp. 610–611. (Use with caution; obsolete)
- Eubel, Conradus, ed. (1913). Hierarchia catholica, Tomus 1 (second ed.). Münster: Libreria Regensbergiana. p. 301. (in Latin)
- Eubel, Conradus, ed. (1914). Hierarchia catholica, Tomus 2 (second ed.). Münster: Libreria Regensbergiana. p. 175.
- Eubel, Conradus, ed. (1923). Hierarchia catholica, Tomus 3 (second ed.). Münster: Libreria Regensbergiana.
- Gauchat, Patritius (Patrice) (1935). Hierarchia catholica IV (1592–1667). Münster: Libraria Regensbergiana. p. 219.
- Ritzler, Remigius; Sefrin, Pirminus (1952). Hierarchia catholica medii et recentis aevi V (1667–1730). Patavii: Messagero di S. Antonio.
- Ritzler, Remigius; Sefrin, Pirminus (1958). Hierarchia catholica medii et recentis aevi VI (1730–1799). Patavii: Messagero di S. Antonio.

=== Studies ===
- Bartel, Simon (1636). Historica et chronologica praesulum sanctæ regiensis Ecclesiæ nomenclatura. Necnon prolegomena, reiorum Apollinarium antiquitatem, auctorum testimoniis, & lapidum epigraphis comprobantia. Cum indice nominum, ... Authore D. Simone Bartel presbytero regiensi theologo (in Latin). Aix (Aquae Sextiae): apud Stephanum David, Regis, Cleri, atque urbis typographum, hæred. I. Tholosani. [an untrustworthy work, loaded with fantasy: see Albanès, pp. 559–564]
- Duchesne, Louis (1907). Fastes épiscopaux de l'ancienne Gaule: I. Provinces du Sud-Est. Paris: Fontemoing. pp. 283-385. second edition (in French)
- Jean, Armand (1891). Les évêques et les archevêques de France depuis 1682 jusqu'à 1801 (in French). Paris: A. Picard.
- Pisani, Paul (1907). Répertoire biographique de l'épiscopat constitutionnel (1791–1802) (in French). Paris: A. Picard et fils.
- Joseph Hyacinthe Albanés; Ulysse Chevalier (1899). Gallia christiana novissima: Aix, Apt, Fréjus, Gap, Riez et Sisteron (in Latin). Montbéliard: Société anonyme d'imprimerie montbéliardaise.
