= Riez =

Riez Riés (Occitan)
- Commune
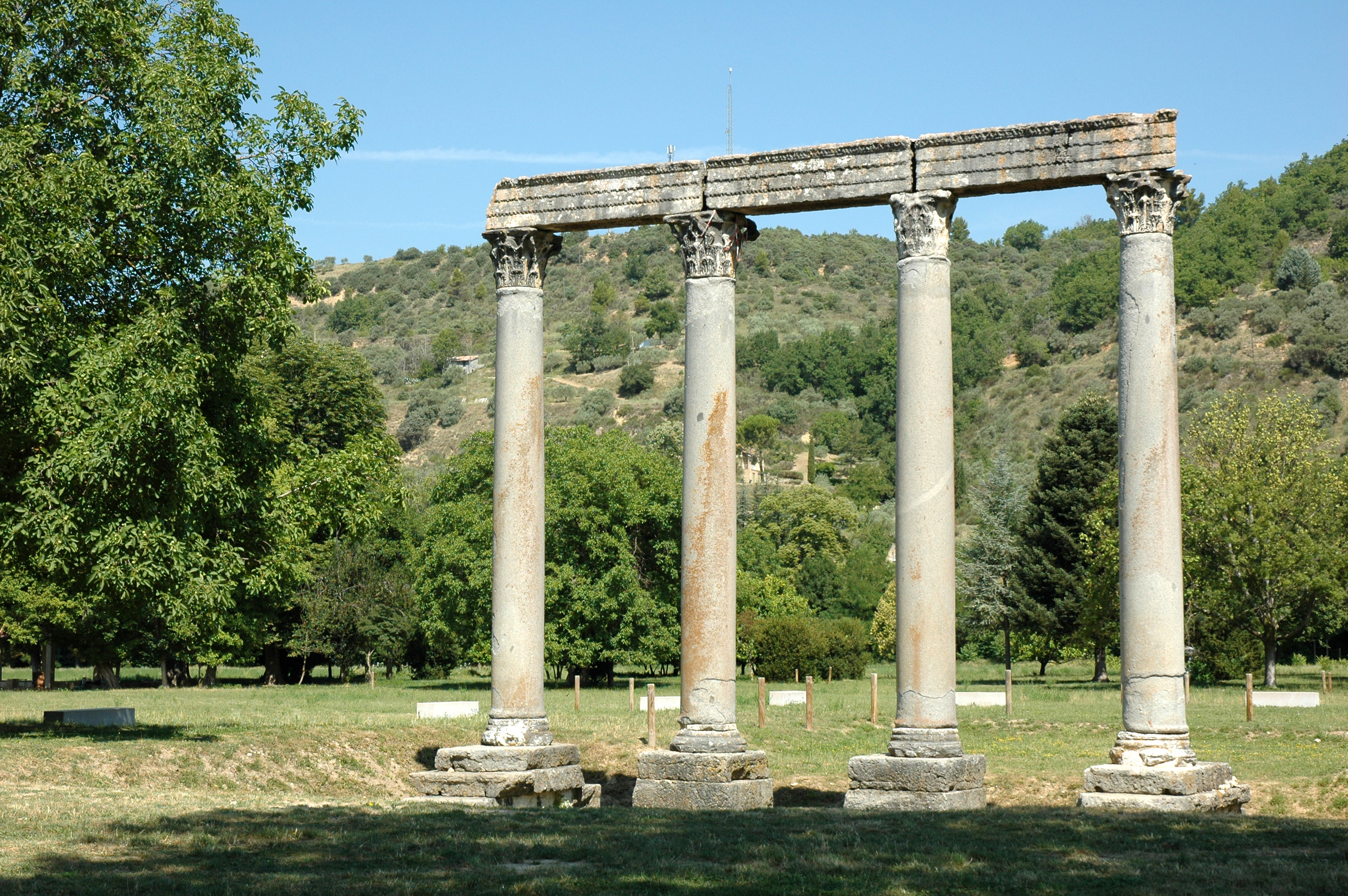
- Roman Temple of Apollo ruins

- Coat of arms
- Location of Riez
- Location within France Location within Provence-Alpes-Côte d'Azur
- Coordinates: 43°49′08″N 6°05′37″E
- Country: France
- Region: Provence-Alpes-Côte d'Azur
- Department: Alpes-de-Haute-Provence
- Arrondissement: Forcalquier
- Canton: Riez
- Intercommunality: Durance-Luberon-Verdon Agglomération

Government
  - Mayor (2026–32): Marc Cellai
- Area^{1}: 40 km^{2} (15 sq mi)
- Elevation: 520 m (1,710 ft)
- Highest elevation: 680 m (2,230 ft)
- Lowest elevation: 473 m (1,552 ft)
- Population (2023): 1,610
  - Density: 40/km^{2} (100/sq mi)
- Time zone: UTC+01:00 (CET)
  - Summer (DST): UTC+02:00 (CEST)
- INSEE/Postal code: 04166 /04500
- ^{1} French Land Register data, which excludes lakes, ponds, glaciers > 1 km^{2} (0.386 sq mi or 247 acres) and river estuaries.

Riez (French pronunciation: [ʁiˈjɛs]; Provençal Occitan: Riés; sometimes Riez-la-Romaine) is a hilly commune in the Alpes-de-Haute-Provence department in the Provence-Alpes-Côte d'Azur region in Southeastern France. It is located northwest of the Lac de Sainte-Croix, stemming from the Verdon, on the road to Valensole, at the confluence of the Auvestre and Colostre.

== Geography ==
The densely built village sits where two small rivers join—the Auvestre and the Colostre—in a glacially widened valley.

== Demographics ==
Historical population
Year	Pop.	±% p.a.
1968	1,379	—
1975	1,560	+1.78%
1982	1,680	+1.06%
1990	1,707	+0.20%
1999	1,667	−0.26%
2007	1,741	+0.54%
2012	1,819	+0.88%
2017	1,856	+0.40%
2023	1,610	−2.34%
Source: INSEE

== Economy ==
Riez is located in a district of fields of commercially grown lavender, which support a honey-making industry. Truffles are found: there is a weekly truffle market on Wednesdays from late November through March.

== History ==
The domed hill was the hillfort headquarters of the Reii a Celto-Ligurian tribe, who gave their name to the Roman community in the valley floor near it: Alebaece Reiorum it was called, then Alebaece Reiorum Apollinares from the Roman temple of Apollo from which four Corinthian columns yet stand. The name evolved to Regium (until the 8th century) then Regina (until the 11th century).

A bishop of Riez is known from an early date, though the first bishop is purely legendary. At the beginning of the 5th century, a certain St. Prosper of Reggio in Emilia figures in the history of Riez and was perhaps its bishop; however, the first definitely known bishop, according to the Catholic Encyclopedia, was St. Maximus (433–460), who succeeded St. Honoratus as Abbot of Lérins and who, in 439, held a council at Riez with a view to effecting ecclesiastical reforms in the churches of southern Gaul. His name is commemorated in the Mont St-Maxime, which is surmounted by the Chapelle St-Maxim (a nunnery). His successor, St. Faustus of Riez (c. 461 – c. 493), also formerly Abbot of Lérins, was noted for his writings against Predestinationists; it was to him that Sidonius Apollinaris dedicated his Carmen Eucharisticum, in gratitude for hospitality received at Riez. Contumeliosus of Riez was deposed for adultery in 534, after the Synod of Marseilles. At a much later date Robert Ceneau (1530–1532), the pulpit orator afterwards Bishop of Avranches, and Gui Bentivoglio (1622–1625), the papal nuncio in France and a defender of French interests at Rome, who played an important role under Louis XIII, are also mentioned among the bishops of Riez. The diocese was suppressed on 29 November 1801, and its territory included in the diocese of Digne .

The 5th-century free-standing baptistery (its small dome rebuilt in the 12th century) is one of only a few surviving from Christian Gaul; it was built about 100 meters from the healing waters that had been sacred to Asclepius, son of Apollo, to whom a dedicatory inscription was found in the 17th century. In the Christianized landscape Riez retained its reputation for healing waters into the 19th century . The former cathedral, located on the axis of the baptistery, was constructed on top of a much larger Roman public building from the 1st–2nd century; it was destroyed at the end of the 15th century. Excavations have revealed a 5th-century structure in the field across the road east of the baptistery. The present small cathedral is dedicated to Nôtre-Dame-de-l'Assomption.

In the Middle Ages, the new structures of the town were gradually built away from the junction adjacent to the rivers to slightly higher ground because of a rising river. Alluvial silt deposited in the beds of the small rivers - a familiar result of deforestation in the rivers' upper watersheds - had raised the beds of the rivers and extended the floodplain. Deep alluvium still covers much of the Roman site of Reii Appolinares.

== Sites ==
Today the baptistery contains a small archaeological museum of altars and funerary steles and a collection of Roman inscriptions, which include an inscribed taurobolium altar. There is a cylindrical milestone from the Aurelian Way. In the Hôtel de ville is the Natural History Museum of Provence.

== See also ==
- Communes of the Alpes-de-Haute-Provence department
- List of works by Louis Botinelly
