= Alamanni (surname) =

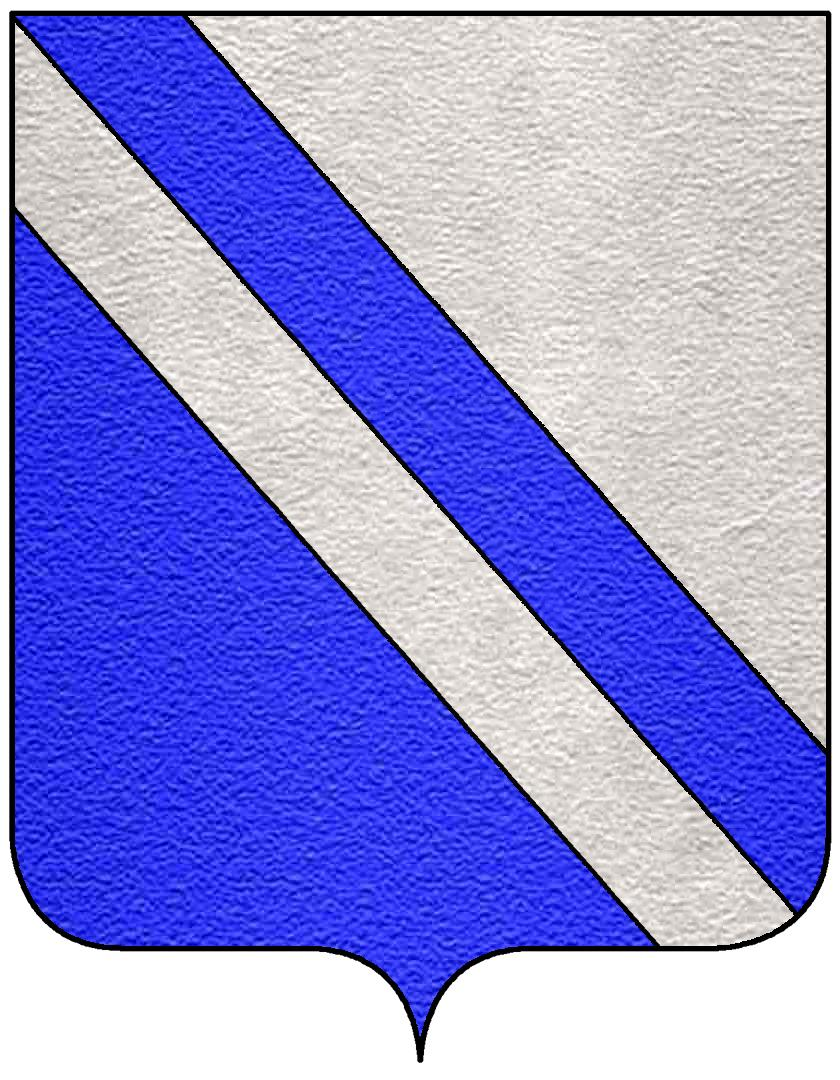
The Alamanni family coat of arms

Alamanni is the name of a noble family of Florence. Originally of German origin, as mentioned in a 1478 poem on the glories of Florence by Ugolino Verino:

Nobile e antica fu la schiatta deli Alamanni. Gente venuta da lontano, originata da sangue germanico
"Noble and ancient was the lineage of the Alamanni. People incoming from afar, originating from Germanic blood.....(?)"

They owned a number of medieval castles, incorporated into Florence in the 14th century as part of Oltrarno. They became one of the most prominent and economically successful families, dealing in wool and other products as well as in banking and money exchange. Luigi Alamanni (1495–1556) was involved in the intrigue against cardinal Giulio de' Medici, then the de facto ruler of Florence. He had to escape to France and the family property was confiscated. Two of Luigi's sons distinguished themselves in France, Giovan Battista, bishop of Bazas and Mâcon, and Niccolò, a commander in the French army deployed alongside Piero Strozzi in the defense of Siena against Cosimo I.

Jacopo Alamanni was publicly executed for trying to organise a militia in opposition to Charles V in the War of the League of Cognac.

In the 18th century, a branch of the family established themselves in Naples, with two palaces in Tiriolo and Catanzaro. Known as Alemanni di Napoli, their coat of arms is or, two bends gules.

== See also ==
- Niccolò Alamanni (1583–1626), a Roman antiquary of Greek origin
