= Faustus of Riez =

Bishop of Riez (c. 400–410–c. 490)

Saint Faustus of Riez
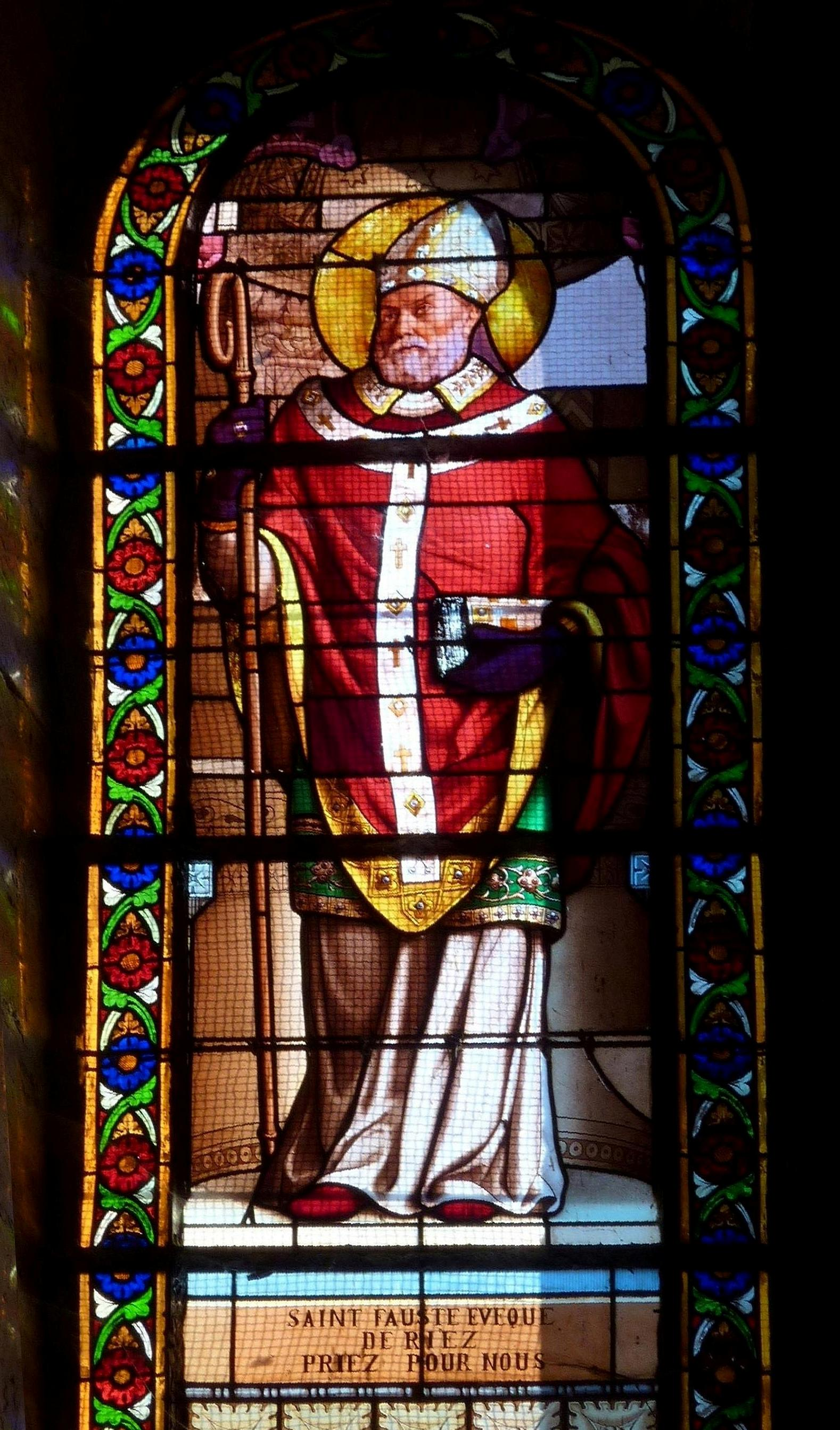
- Saint Fauste, Notre-Dame de l'Assomption, Riez
- Born: c. 400-410; Britain or Brittany
- Died: c. 490; Southern France
- Venerated in: Eastern Orthodoxy; Roman Catholic Church
- Feast: September 28

Faustus of Riez was an early Bishop of Riez (Rhegium) in Southern Gaul (Provence), the best known and most distinguished opponent of Pelagianism.

== Biography ==
Faustus was born between 400 and 410, and his contemporaries, Avitus of Vienne and Sidonius Apollinaris, say that he was born in Britain. In his youth he was devoted to the study of elocution and Christian philosophy. He is thought by some to have been a lawyer but owing to the influence of his mother, famed for her sanctity, he abandoned secular pursuits as a young man and entered the monastery of Lérins. Here he was soon ordained to the priesthood and after about eight years, because of his extraordinary piety was chosen in 432 to be head of the monastery, in succession to Maximus who had become Bishop of Riez. His career as abbot lasted about twenty or twenty-five years during which he attained a high reputation for his wonderful gifts as an extempore preacher and for his stern asceticism.

After the death of Maximus he became Bishop of Riez. This elevation did not make any change in his manner of life; he continued his ascetic practices, and frequently returned to the monastery of Lérins to renew his fervour. He was a zealous advocate of monasticism and established many monasteries in his diocese. In spite of his activity in the discharge of his duties as bishop, he participated in all the theological discussions of his time and became known as a stern opponent of Arianism in all its forms. For this, and as is said for his view, stated below, of the corporeity of the human soul, he incurred the enmity of the Arian Euric, King of the Visigoths, who had gained possession of a large portion of Southern Gaul, and was banished from his see. His exile lasted eight years, during which time he was aided by loyal friends. On the death of Euric he resumed his labours at the head of his diocese and continued there until his death between 490 and 495.

His own diocesan flock considered him a saint and erected a basilica in his honour.

== Works and theological position ==
Throughout his life Faustus was an uncompromising adversary of Pelagius, whom he styled pestifer ('plague bringer'), and equally decided in his opposition to the doctrine of predestination which he styled "erroneous, blasphemous, heathen, fatalistic, and conducive to immorality". This doctrine in its strongest form had been expounded by a presbyter named Lucidus and was condemned by two synods, at Arles and Lyons (475). At the request of the bishops who composed these synods, and especially Leontius of Arles, Faustus wrote the Libri duo de Gratia Dei et humanae mentis libero arbitrio, in which he argued against the doctrines of the predestinarians as well as those of Pelagius. Faustus "teaches that God’s grace always encourages, precedes and helps our will; and whatever free will alone will have acquired by virtue of the labour of a pious mercy is not our merit, but grace’s gift."

The work was marked by so-called Semipelagianism, and for several years was bitterly attacked. Moderate Pelagianism was condemned by the Second Synod of Orange in 529 which affirmed prevenient grace (and so synergism.) The opposition to Faustus was not fully developed in his lifetime and he died with a reputation for sanctity.

Faustus wrote also: Libri duo de Spiritu Sancto (P.L., LXII, 9), wrongly ascribed to the Roman deacon Paschasius. His Libellus parvus adversus Arianos et Macedonianos, mentioned by Gennadius of Massilia, seems to be lost.

Faustus maintained that the human soul is in a certain sense corporeal or material, God alone being a pure spirit.

His feast day is 28 September.

== Sources ==
- Fitzgerald, Allan; Cavadini, John C. (1999). Augustine Through the Ages: An Encyclopedia. Cambridge/Grand Rapids: Wm. B. Eerdmans. pp. 356–358. ISBN 978-0-8028-3843-8.
- Smith, Thomas A. (1990). De Gratia: Faustus of Riez's Treatise on Grace and Its Place in the History of Theology. University of Notre Dame Press. ISBN 978-0-268-00866-6.
- His correspondence (epistulae) and sermons are found in: Faustus Reiensis (1891). Augustus Engelbrecht (ed.). Favsti Reiensis Praeter sermones psevdo-evsebianos opera. Corpus Scriptorum Ecclesiasticorum Latinorum, XXI (in Latin). Prague-Vienna-Leipzig: F. Tempsky.
