= Humilimont Abbey =

Former Premonstratensian abbey in Switzerland

- Interactive map of Humilimont Abbey

Monastery information
- Full name: Abbey of Humilimont
- Other name: Abbey of Marsens
- Order: Premonstratensians
- Established: between 1136 and 1141
- Disestablished: 1580
- Mother house: Lac de Joux Abbey
- Dedication: Virgin Mary, Saint Peter, Saint Martin
- Diocese: Diocese of Lausanne

People
- Founder: Guillaume II de Corbières

Site
- Location: Marsens, Fribourg, Switzerland

Humilimont Abbey was a Premonstratensian abbey located in the commune of Marsens in the Canton of Fribourg, Switzerland. Also known as the Abbey of Marsens, it was dedicated to the Virgin Mary, Saint Peter, and Saint Martin. The abbey belonged to the circary (province) of Burgundy within the Premonstratensian order.

== Foundation and early history ==
The abbey was founded between 1136 and 1141 by Guillaume II de Corbières, who also participated in the 1126 foundation of Lac de Joux Abbey, which became Humilimont's mother house. The exact date of foundation is difficult to establish, as the foundation charter, known only through certified copies, is likely a forgery. An alternative tradition attributes the foundation to three brothers from the Everdes-Vuippens family, who held the advocacy rights in the 14th century.

In its early years, Humilimont housed a double monastery, with both male and female religious communities. Around 1140/1148, the female community was relocated to Posat.

== Land management and properties ==
The abbey managed extensive lands, including fields and vineyards, as well as granges at Marsens, Mollettes, Posat, La Bruyère, Hauteville, and Dézaley. Until the mid-13th century, these properties were worked by lay brothers (conversi), after which the abbey began leasing them out. The abbey also possessed the churches of Vuippens and Villarvolard, though these were rarely served by the canons themselves.

== Community and social relations ==
The 1338 necrology, which was continued until the abbey's suppression in 1580, reveals the social diversity of the community and demonstrates the abbey's strong ties with the Premonstratensian order. Relations with the abbey's advocates were frequently conflictual. In the 14th century, the Everdes-Vuippens family held the advocacy rights, followed by the Langin-d'Everdes family in the 15th century.

Following the conquest of the seigneury of Everdes in 1475, the advocacy rights passed to the city of Fribourg. The city granted Humilimont citizenship rights in 1482 and exercised increasing influence over the election of abbots during the 16th century.

== Suppression ==
The journal of Claude Fracheboud, the penultimate abbot, has been preserved. Despite protests from the monks and the Premonstratensian order, the abbey was suppressed in 1580 to facilitate the establishment of the Jesuits in Fribourg.

== Bibliography ==
- "Le Journal de Claude Fracheboud, avant-dernier abbé d'Humilimont". In: Annales fribourgeoises, 13 (1925), pp. 215–231; 14 (1926), pp. 244–257.
- Helvetia Sacra, IV/3, pp. 411–426.
- Tremp, Ernst; Utz Tremp, Kathrin (eds.): Das Nekrologium der Prämonstratenserabtei Humilimont (Marsens). Fribourg 2022 (Spicilegium Friburgenses, 51).
