= Aillon Charterhouse =

Carthusian monastery

Aillon Charterhouse, also Mont-Sainte-Marie Charterhouse
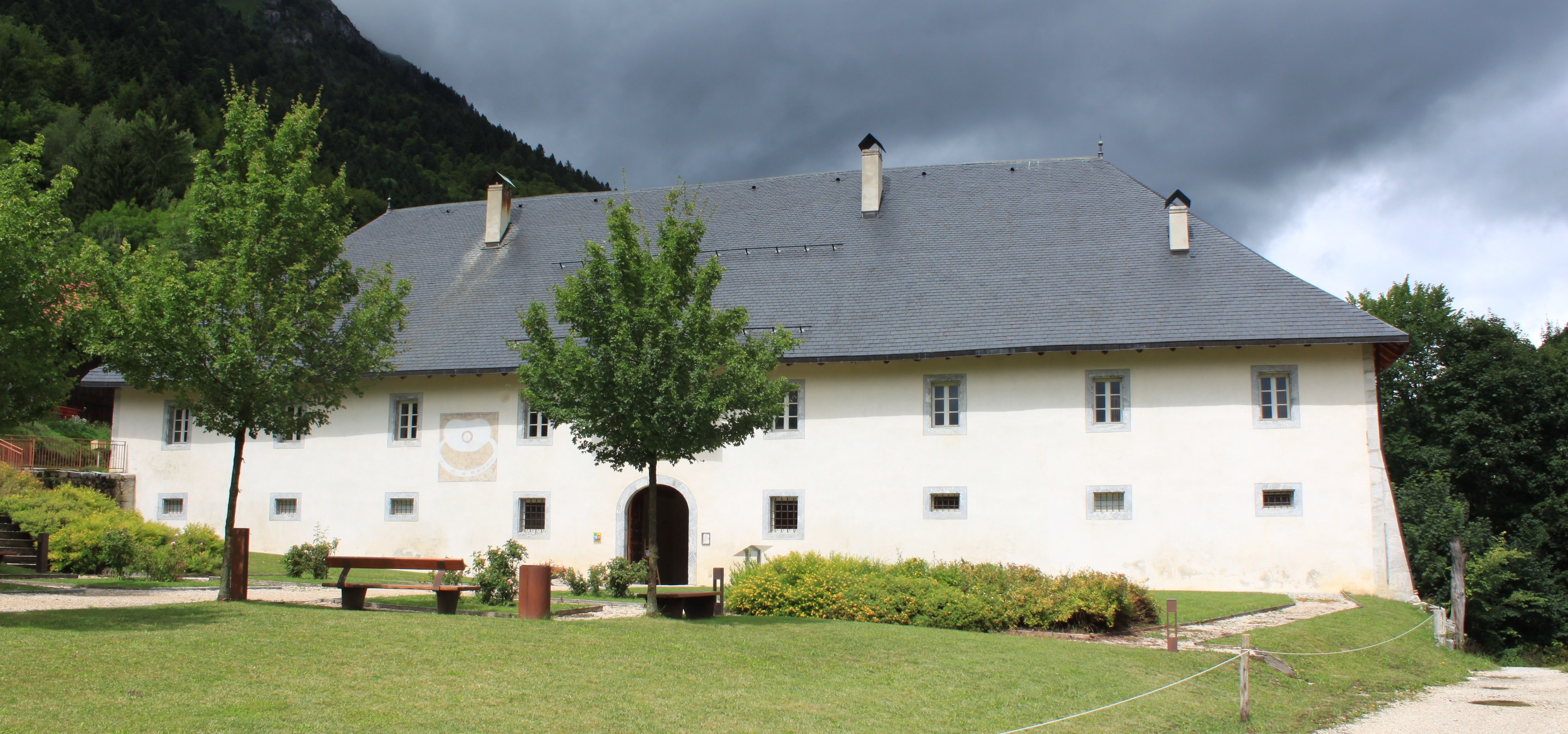

Religion
- Affiliation: Carthusians
- District: Aillon-le-Jeune
- Province: Savoie
- Region: Auvergne-Rhône-Alpes

Location
- Country: France
- Interactive map of Aillon Charterhouse, also Mont-Sainte-Marie Charterhouse
- Coordinates: 45°36′53″N 6°06′40″E

Architecture
- Completed: 1241, 1582

Website
- www.lachartreusedaillon.com

Aillon Charterhouse, also Mont-Sainte-Marie Charterhouse (French: Chartreuse d'Aillon, Chartreuse Notre-Dame d'Aillon, Chartreuse de Mont-Sainte-Marie; Latin: [de] Monte Sancte-Marie de Allione), is a former Carthusian monastery, or charterhouse, located in the commune of Aillon-le-Jeune, in the Savoie department of the Auvergne-Rhône-Alpes region of France.

The monastery was founded in the Bauges Mountains in the second half of the 12th century by Count Humbert III of Savoy, who provided endowments to monks likely already established at the site. The only remaining building was listed as a historic monument in 1994. Since 2008, it has housed the Heritage Center of the Bauges Massif Regional Natural Park.

== Name ==
The charterhouse was dedicated to the Virgin Mary under the title Mont-Sainte-Marie d’Aillon (Monte Sancte-Marie de Allione in the early 13th century), and later under the name Notre-Dame. Jean-Pierre Aniel, archivist and palaeographer, refers to the monastery in his 1983 work Les Maisons de chartreux as Cartusia B. Mariae de Allione. Abbé Laurent Morand (1830–1894), a historian of the Bauges region, referred to it as the Chartreuse d'Aillon or Chartreuse de Lourdes in his three-volume history published between 1889 and 1891. In 1759, Joseph-Antoine Besson referred to it as “that of Haillon in the Bauges.”

The toponym Aillon (Allionis) originates from a former fundus (estate) named after its owner, likely a person named Allio. Canon Gros, drawing in part on the work of Abbé Laurent Morand, compiled several historical references to the charterhouse and its members: Guigo prior de Allione (1158), Domus Allionis (c. 1178, the presumed date of the foundation), Bernardus prior de Allione (1198), prior Allonis (1223), Cura de Allion (c. 1344), and Prioratus de Ayllone (14th century).

== Geography ==
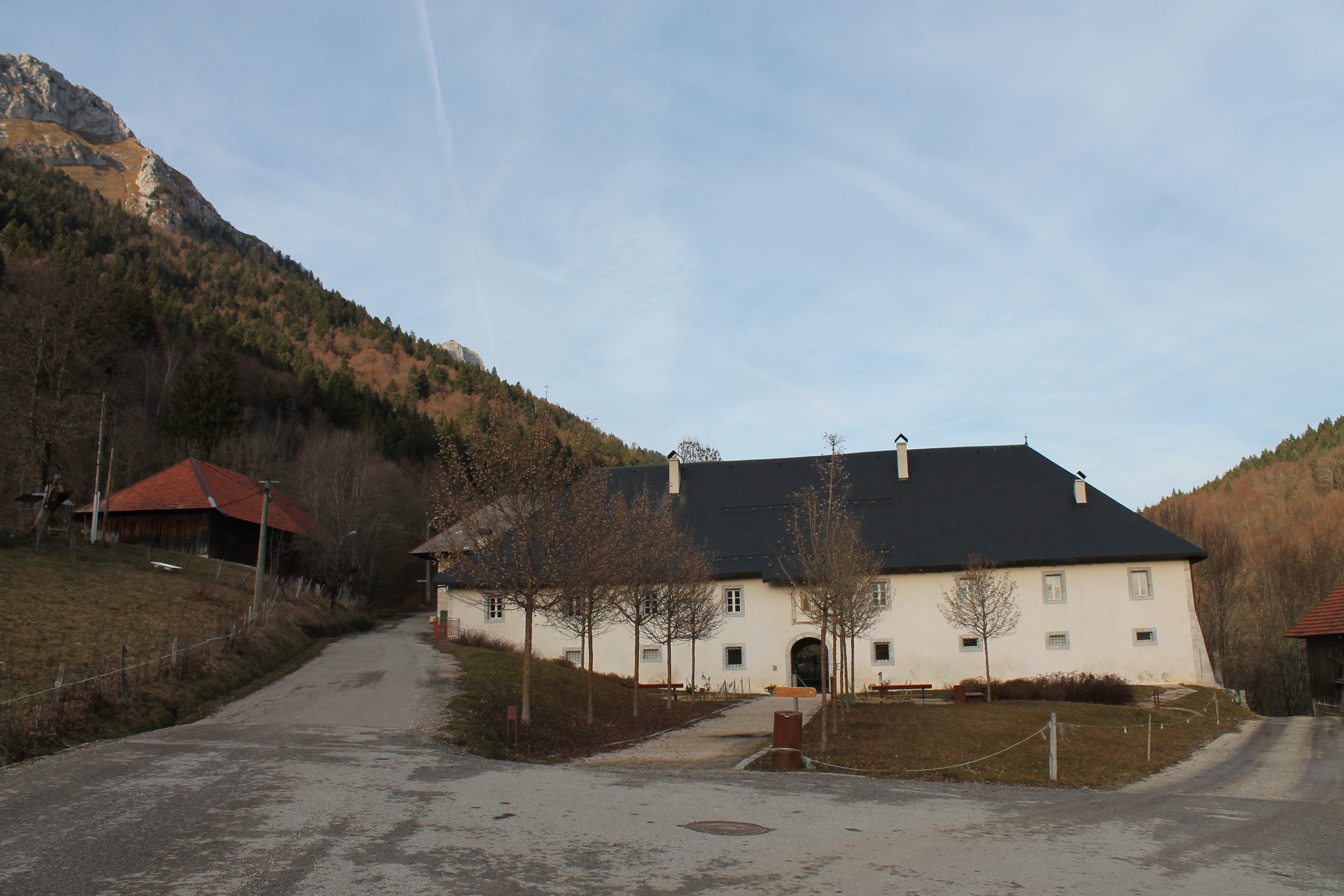
The Chartreuse d'Aillon and, on the left, the Roc de Pra Renard (1,850 m), the southern tip of the Colombier or Colombier d'Aillon mountain range.

Aillon Charterhouse is located on the southwestern edge of the Bauges Massif, (Note: Lullin & Le Fort 1866, p. 448) within the commune of Aillon-le-Jeune in the Savoie department, part of the Auvergne-Rhône-Alpes region. Historically, the site lay on the boundary between the dioceses of Geneva and Grenoble and was under the jurisdiction of the former.

The Carthusian monks were granted land in the former parish of Aillon, particularly in a wilderness area corresponding to the valley known as Lourdes or Aillon. (Note: Morand 1890, p. 131) This valley, approximately ten kilometers in length, (Note: Morand 1890, p. 132) is oriented from southwest to northwest. Charter expert Raymond Oursel described the location as an "extraordinary and wild 'end of the world' ". Canon Gros notes that the name Lourdens is relatively recent and does not appear in the cartulary of Aillon Charterhouse. Archivist and palaeographer Pierre Duparc, in a study on monks in the diocese of Geneva, refers to the "narrow valley of La Fullie", now spelled Fully, which also names the stream that flows through it. The toponyms Fullie and Fully derive from a term meaning "deciduous forest" in the Savoyard dialect.

The valley housing Aillon Charterhouse lies below the Grand Colombier, also referred to as Colombier d’Aillon. The site is located at an altitude of approximately 1,026 meters (1,030 meters according to the IGN map) and is accessible from the south via departmental road D32B, originating from the main village of Aillon-le-Jeune.

Although geographically close to the deanery of Savoie, which was part of the Diocese of Grenoble, both the parish of Aillon and the charterhouse historically fell under the deanery of Annecy, within the Diocese of Geneva. The monastery was affiliated with the Carthusian province of Chartreuse. Following the annexation of the Duchy of Savoy by revolutionary France in 1792 and the reorganization of ecclesiastical territories under the Concordat of 1801, the short-lived Diocese of Chambéry and Geneva was established. During this period the monks were expelled by revolutionary forces and the monastery was abandoned.

== History ==
=== Foundation ===
The exact date of the foundation of Aillon Charterhouse remains uncertain. Various historical sources propose different dates. Charles-Joseph Morotius (Dom Morozzo), author of Theatrum Chronologicum Sacri Ordinis Cartusiensis (1681), and the authors of the Gallia Christiana suggest the year 1143. An undated document titled Series et Origo Domorum Ordinis Cartusiensis, referring specifically to the Aillon house, states: "Domus Allionis, in Sabaudia, et diocesis gebennensis, erecta et dotata est anno millesimo centesimo septuagesimo tertio ab Humberto III." Additionally, the Carta Capituli Cartusiensis, the charter of the Carthusian general chapter from 1208, notes in the margin that the foundation occurred "before 1178." Abbé Laurent Morand, in his study of the charterhouse, questions the 1143 date, pointing out that Count Humbert III of Savoy did not succeed his father, Amadeus III, until the latter died in Cyprus in August 1148. Pierre Jacques Le Seigneur, in a 2008 work on the charterhouse, revisits Morand's analysis and references these various traditions.

The Régeste genevois (1866) lists Aillon Charterhouse under the entry "Aillon" in its general alphabetical index as a Carthusian monastery in the Diocese of Geneva, stating it was "founded around 1183 by Count Humbert." This dating (Note: Lullin & Le Fort 1866, p. 116) follows Abbé Joseph-Antoine Besson’s Mémoires pour l'histoire ecclésiastique des diocèses de Genève, Tarentaise, Aoste et Maurienne et du décanat de Savoie (1759), and was also adopted by François Rabut in Petite chronique de Frère Billard, chartreux (1860).

More recent scholarship, including works by Canon Gros (1935), Jean-Pierre Aniel (1983), the authors of Histoire des communes savoyardes (1984), and Pierre Jacques Le Seigneur (2008), generally agrees on the year 1178 for the first charter (Charter 1). The medievalist Pierre Duparc (1995) cites two key dates: around 1178, when the monks received a domain as a pledge from a lord of Apremont, and 1189, when they acquired the land definitively. Pierre Jacques Le Seigneur notes that in 1189, “Mount Sainte-Marie, which overlooks the new convent, was sold to the monks by Aymon of Apremont,” as recorded in Charter 3.

Historical tradition agrees on the context. Count Humbert III made a significant donation to the Carthusians. The foundation charter begins: “Let it be known to all present and future that I, Humbert, Count of Maurienne and Marquis in Italy, to ensure the salvation of the soul of my father, of that of my mother, of those of my deceased relatives, and of my own, have, out of my love for Almighty God, endowed the house of Aillon, of the Carthusian order.” (Note: Morand 1890, pp. 137–140) According to this document, he granted the abbey all his rights over the land of Aillon, the lake of La Thuile (lacum meum de la Tuelli)—“since within the borders of the new house there are not many fish, I have given it my lake of La Thuile”—as well as “the pastures of Vellein, for the wintering of sheep, the lands of Lanelajour stretching from Chapônnay to Marennes, to establish a meadow and a barn for the sheep’s share, the fief of Guy Siboud adjacent to the meadow, and all the wood necessary for heating the shepherds.” Vassals of the count - Nantelme and Villelme de Miolans, Boson of Apremont, Chabert of Varax, and Ponce of Conflens - who were witnesses of the donation, also granted or sold properties and lands to the charterhouse.

The donation by Count Humbert III is generally considered to mark the foundation of the monastery, although the prior presence of monks appears likely. Abbé Morand suggests an establishment beginning in 1149.

Guy, identified as the bishop of Aosta and prior of Meyriat Charterhouse, was present at the foundation. (Note: Morand 1890, pp. 231–252) He was likely Guy of Aosta. Canon Gros notes the mention of a Guigo prior de Allione in 1158. Morand, while accepting 1178 as the foundation date, interprets Guy's role as that of an organizer of the community rather than a prior.

The Carthusian monks who settled at Aillon probably came from Meyriat Charterhouse, located on the border between Bresse and Bullon. According to Morand, their first settlement may have been at sites known as Muret or Saint-Bruno, the latter possibly referring to Saint Bruno, the founder of the Carthusian order. The exact date of their establishment at the current location is unknown.

=== Donations by the counts of Savoy ===
Aillon Charterhouse was the third Carthusian monastery established in the southern part of the region, following Le Reposoir (1151, diocese of Geneva, in Faucigny) and Saint-Hugon (1173, diocese of Grenoble, in Savoy near the Dauphiné border). The Carthusian order also founded three other monasteries in the diocese of Geneva: Vallon (1138, in Chablais), Oujon (1146, in the Pays de Vaud), and Pomier (circa 1170, in the Genevois).

The donation by Count Humbert III was confirmed by his successors, who also granted additional privileges to the monastery. Aillon Charterhouse received support from prominent noble families of Savoy, including the houses of Apremont, Chignin, Miolans, and Ravoire (or La Ravoire, near Montmélian). (Note: Morand 1890, pp. 143–144)

In 1216, Count Thomas I of Savoy confirmed the donations made by his father. (Note: Morand 1890, p. 140) During his reign, he granted the monastery six additional endowments and placed it under his protection. (Note: Lullin & Le Fort 1866, p. 448)

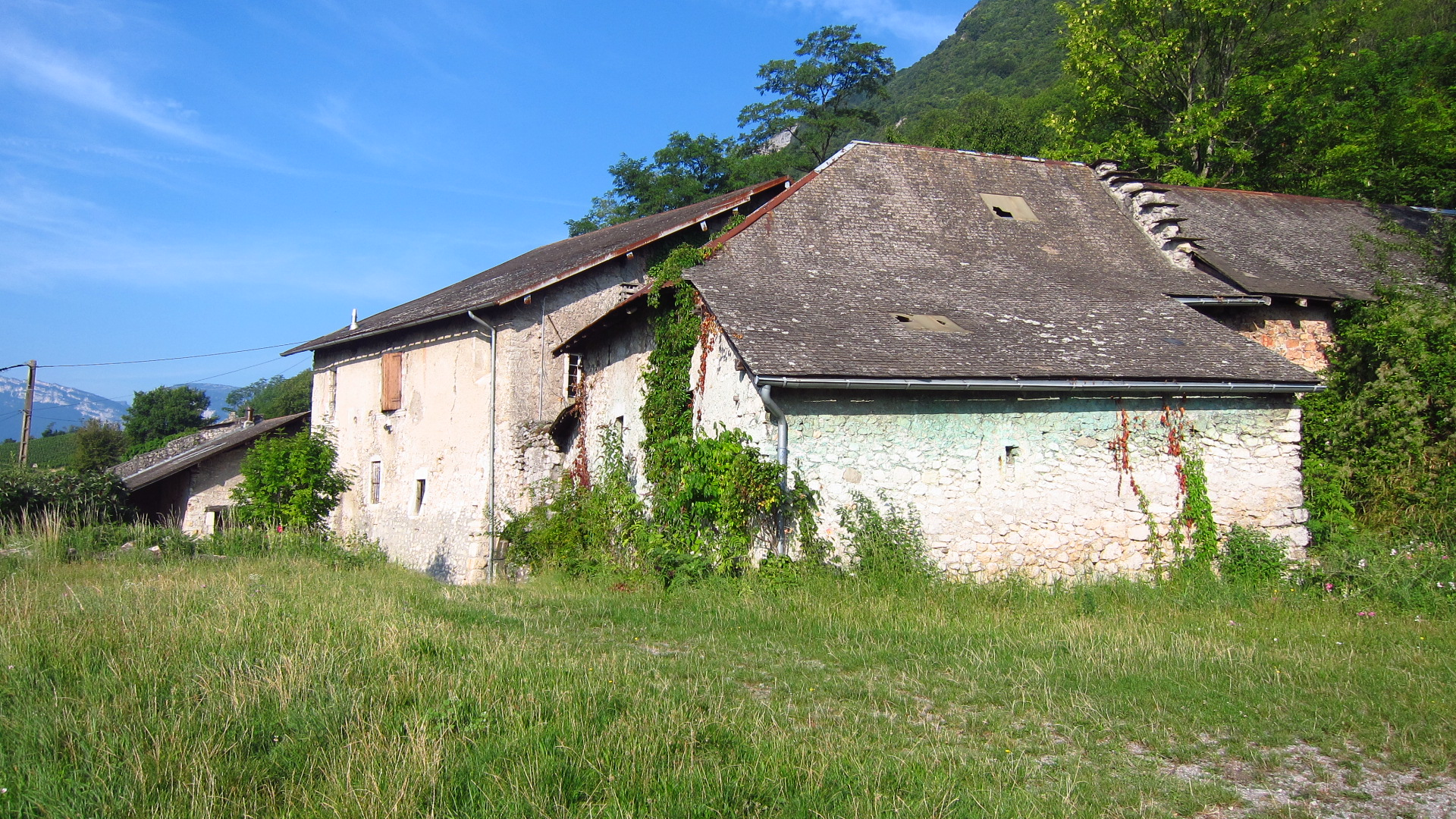
Grangerie de Lourdens (2013).

Count Amadeus IV of Savoy continued the endowments to Aillon Charterhouse, notably granting land in the plain of Montmélian in 1236, (Note: Lullin & Le Fort 1866, p. 184) including the estate of Lourdens in Cruet. In 1251, he confirmed the donations made by his predecessors, (Note: Lullin & Le Fort 1866, p. 209) and in his will of 1252, he allocated one thousand sous to the monastery, as well as to the monasteries of Arvières and Hautecombe. (Note: Lullin & Le Fort 1866, p. 211)

In 1383, Count Amadeus VI of Savoy bequeathed the fortified castle of Pierre-Châtel to the Carthusian order. The prior of Aillon assumed command of the fortress, a role that was contrary to the Carthusian rule, but which continued until 1583.

A visit in 1476 documented the possessions of the monastery at that time, including twenty servants and a substantial herd comprising 45 dairy cows, 8 heifers and calves, 19 draft oxen, 24 bulls, 19 goats, and 24 mules and donkeys. The monastery owned approximately 3,000 hectares of land, primarily forest, about ten farms in the Lourdes valley, holdings in Doucy, and vineyards in the Combe de Savoie.

=== Monastic life ===
The various donations contributed to the prosperity of the charterhouse. The number of monks increased from 7 or 8 at the time of the foundation to more than twenty, excluding lay brothers and so-called "donated" individuals. The latter were not bound by monastic vows but had entered into contractual agreements with the monastery and were considered hired workers.

The monks were primarily of local origin, though some came from other regions, according to Dom Charles Le Couteulx (1639–1709), a Carthusian historian.

Historians Nicolas Carrier and Fabrice Mouthon, in a 2010 study on mountain communities, observe that the Carthusians took measures to preserve the isolation of their environment. They cite the example of Aillon, which reportedly secured the removal of the inhabitants of the village of Le Cimetière, then the parish center of Aillon, though the circumstances remain unclear.

The monastery was destroyed by fire on several occasions. A fire in 1582 required extensive reconstruction, which was undertaken by Prior Dom Fiacre Billard. The monastery was rebuilt in the 17th century. The entrance portal of the former guesthouse bears two stone keys engraved with the dates 1646 and 1671.

A decline in adherence to the Carthusian rule was observed. According to Le Diocèse de Genève-Annecy (1985), a visitation in 1476 reported a prior who was negligent in both spiritual and temporal matters, and monks who did not observe silence or the obligations of their rule. Later reports mentioned further concerns, including the use of tobacco, unauthorized outings, inappropriate behavior among the monks, and lack of discipline during church services.

=== Activities ===
The expansion of the monastery’s activities gradually necessitated a larger workforce. Initially located in an uninhabited area, the site attracted peasants who settled to cultivate the land and engage in ironworking, particularly in trip-hammer forges.

The monks extracted iron ore from the Hurtières Valley in Maurienne, where copper, lead, and silver were also present. These metals were transported by mule over the Col du Frêne and processed at various locations where the Carthusians had established foundries and trip-hammers. A foundry was established in the Bauges at a site known as Martinet dessus (present-day Aillon-le-Jeune) in the 17th or 18th century. Another trip-hammer was installed on the nant d’Aillon, and a second site, Martinet dessous, was located in the current commune of Aillon-le-Vieux.

Additional facilities included a trip-hammer, a flour mill, and a sawmill in Albigny, in the plain at the confluence of the Isère and Arc rivers. These installations are recorded on the Sardinian cadastral map of 1728.

The ironworking operations ceased following the occupation of the Duchy of Savoy by French troops.

=== French occupation and ruin of the House ===
On the eve of the French Revolution's arrival in Savoy, Aillon Charterhouse was described as prosperous, having recovered from a period of decline during the modern era.

In 1792, the Duchy of Savoy was annexed by France. Adjutant General Badelaune (or Bagdelonne) commanded the French revolutionary troops stationed in the Combe de Savoie, at Saint-Pierre-d’Albigny. (Note: Morand 1891, p. 284) The populations of the Bauges region and Aillon Charterhouse were required to supply provisions to the French army, despite local opposition.

In February 1790, the Constituent Assembly voted to abolish monastic vows and suppress religious orders and congregations. The monks of Aillon Charterhouse refused to swear allegiance to the Civil Constitution of the Clergy and were subsequently expelled. Their property was confiscated. During the Reign of Terror, some monks found refuge with François Bébert, later mayor of Arith, (Note: Morand 1891, p. 362) while others sought asylum in Turin, then the capital of the Kingdom of Sardinia. The monastery was occupied by approximately 400 French soldiers.

The furnishings of Aillon Charterhouse were sold in February 1793 under the supervision of notary François-Marie Dumaz. (Note: Morand 1891, p. 383) In 1794, the remaining possessions were described as "very significant [but] amounted to only 11 lots for the properties located in the commune of Aillon." Following the Albitte Decree, (Note: Morand 1891, pp. 416–417) the bell towers and buildings were dismantled. One of the church bells was concealed. The site was used as a quarry, and its stones were sold locally. According to Abbé Morand, the high altar was transferred in 1806 to the church of Saint-Donat in Aillon-le-Vieux. (Note: Morand 1891, pp. 412–413) However, the 1984 volume Histoire des communes savoyardes notes that it is no longer present.

The entrance portal of the former monastery was reused in the construction of the new parish church of Aillon-le-Jeune, which became independent from the parish of Aillon-le-Vieux in 1804.

By that year, the monastery was largely in ruins, with only the entrance building, known as the “building of strangers,” remaining, representing approximately one-tenth of the original complex. The chapel of the Correrie, located downhill, was preserved. The anonymous 1834 work Voyage aux ruines de la Chartreuse d’Aillon notes that some pilgrimages continued to be made to the site.

=== Rehabilitation of the site ===
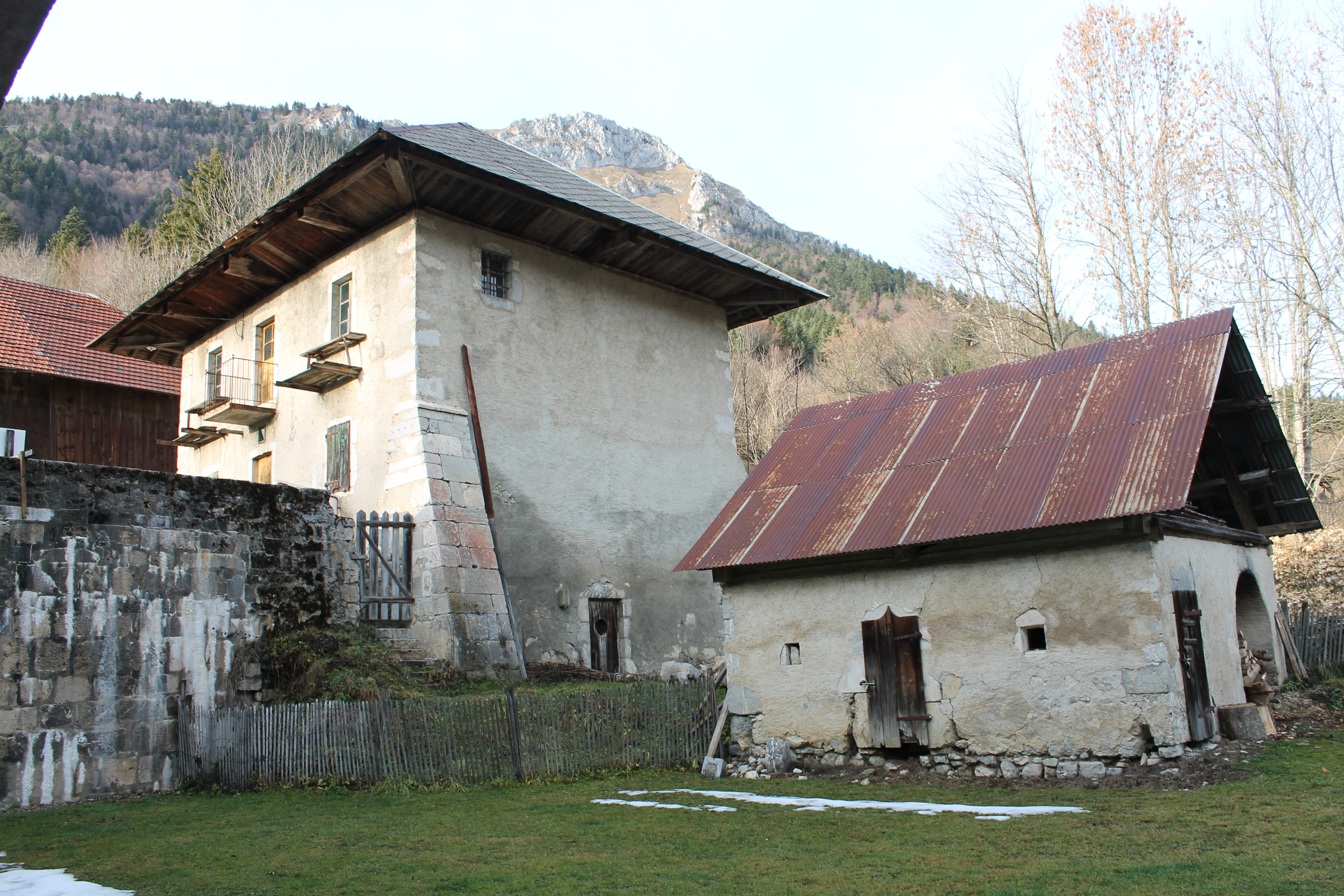
Agricultural buildings constructed behind the charterhouse using old materials.

Starting in 1853, the building was acquired by the Bérard brothers for use as a residence and agricultural facility.

In the 1980s, interest in the site was renewed by local figures, including Henri Bouvier, mayor of Le Châtelard. This led to the creation of the Association for the Safeguarding of the Charterhouse of Aillon, which aimed to preserve the structure. In 1990, the owners sold the deteriorating building to the Communauté de communes du Cœur des Bauges. Initial restoration work began shortly thereafter, including roof repairs in 1994. The project received financial support from local authorities, the intercommunal community, the commune of Aillon-le-Jeune, the Bauges Regional Natural Park (established in 1995), members of the association, the European Union, and the organization La Sauvegarde de l'art français. This work marked the inclusion in 1994 of the “existing buildings and land corresponding to the charterhouse” in the Supplementary Inventory of Historic Monuments.

The preservation of the building was notable, as it was the only structure in the Bauges classified as a historic monument at the time. According to Marianne Palisse, who studied institutional initiatives in the Bauges, only members of the association and the regional park demonstrated sustained interest in the project. These stakeholders supported the idea of developing the site to reflect the monastic heritage and contemplative character of the location, including the creation of a chapel.

The building was later converted into the Maison du Patrimoine culturel rural (House of Rural Cultural Heritage) of the Bauges Massif Regional Natural Park and inaugurated in 2008. It ceased operations at the end of the 2024 tourist season due to the park's withdrawal from the project, citing insufficient funding to maintain its activities.

== Description of the charterhouse and its possessions ==
=== Monastery or “Maison Haute” ===
Of the approximately 1,000 m² that once comprised the charterhouse, also known as the "Maison Haute" (High House), only the entrance structure remains. This building, referred to as the "building of strangers", originally served as the guesthouse. Its design follows a geometric layout, as described in a few verses from a 17th- or 18th-century handwritten poem, according to Morand.

==== Entrance building (existing) ====
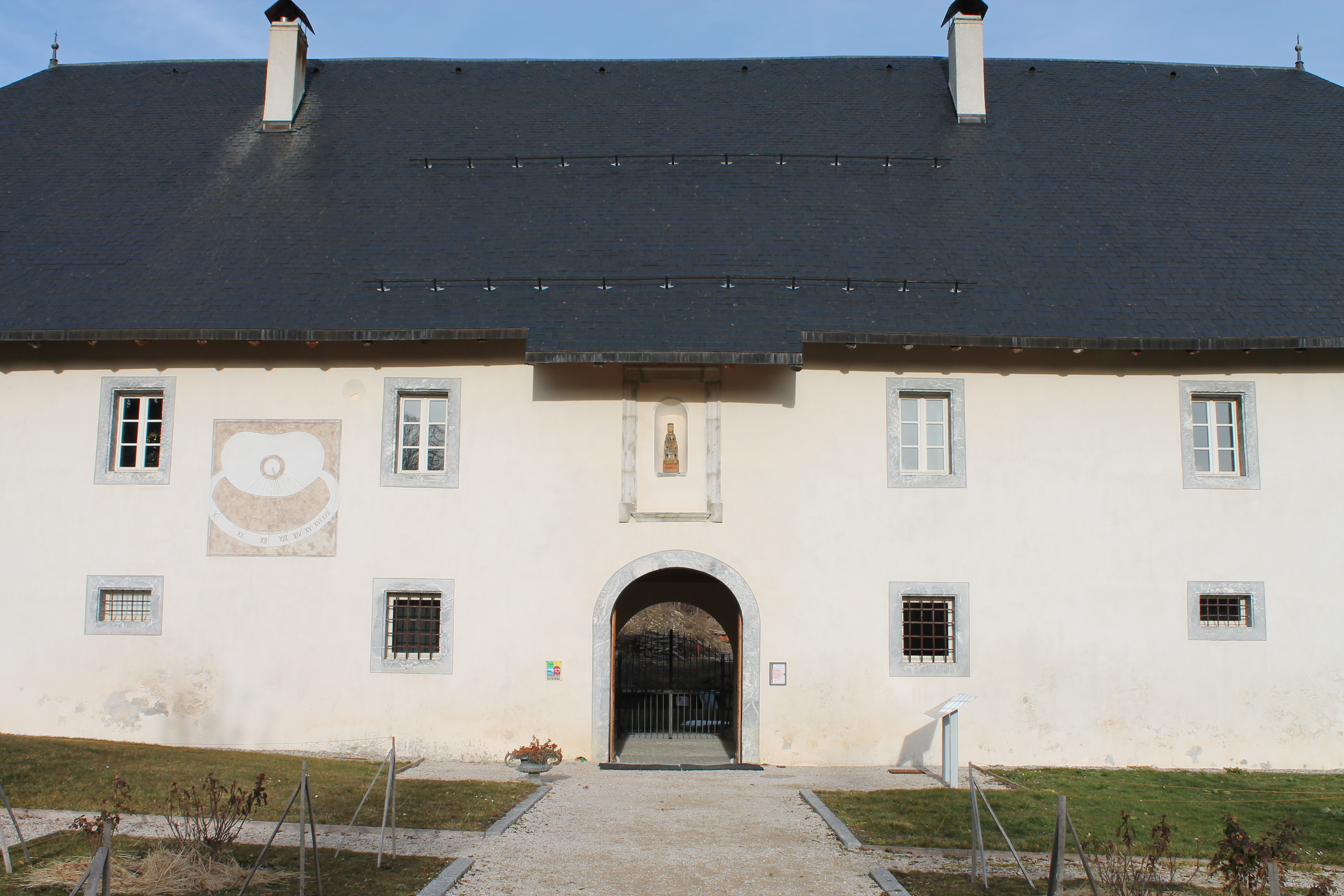
Restored entrance building (December 2015).

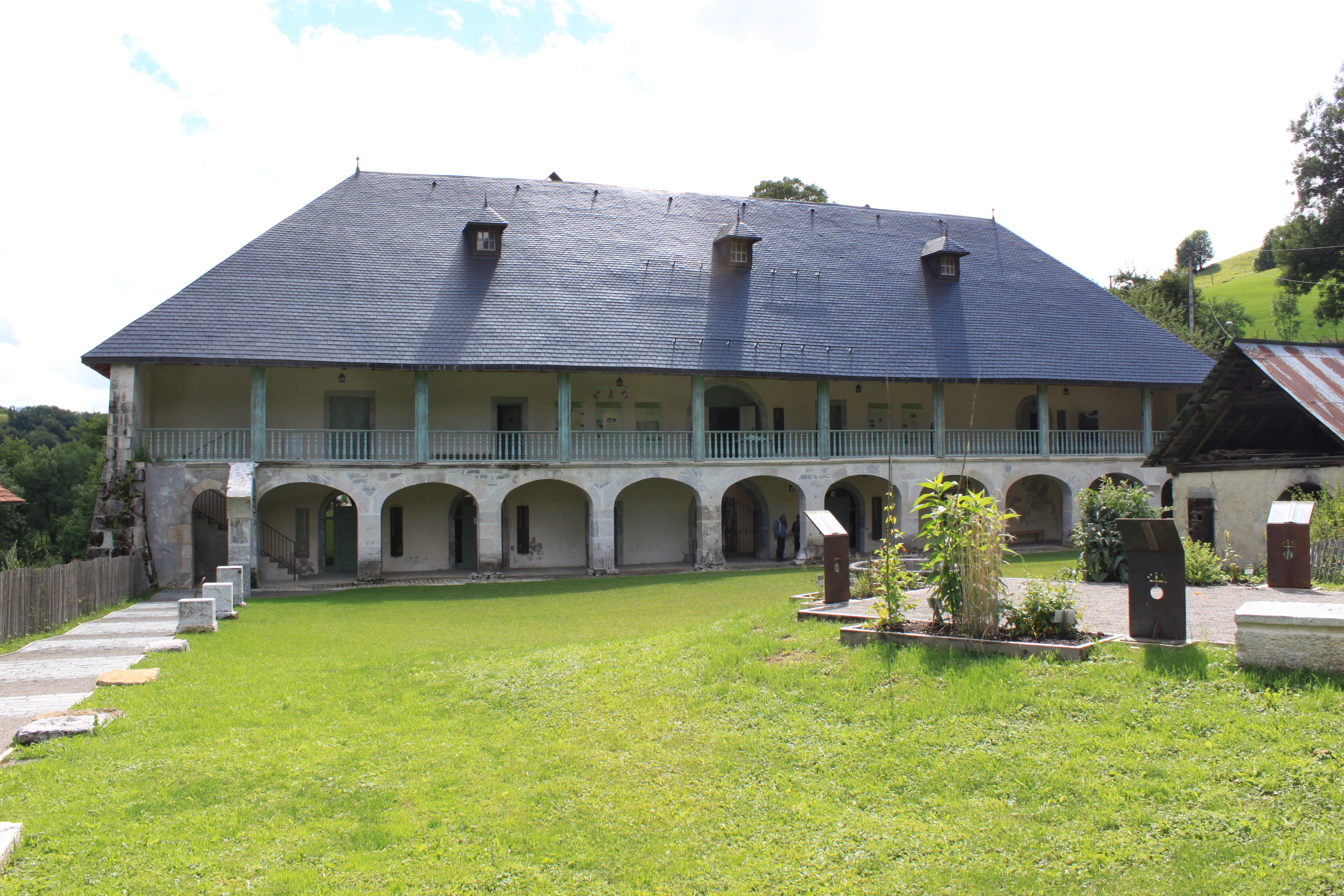
Rear view of the building (July 2017).

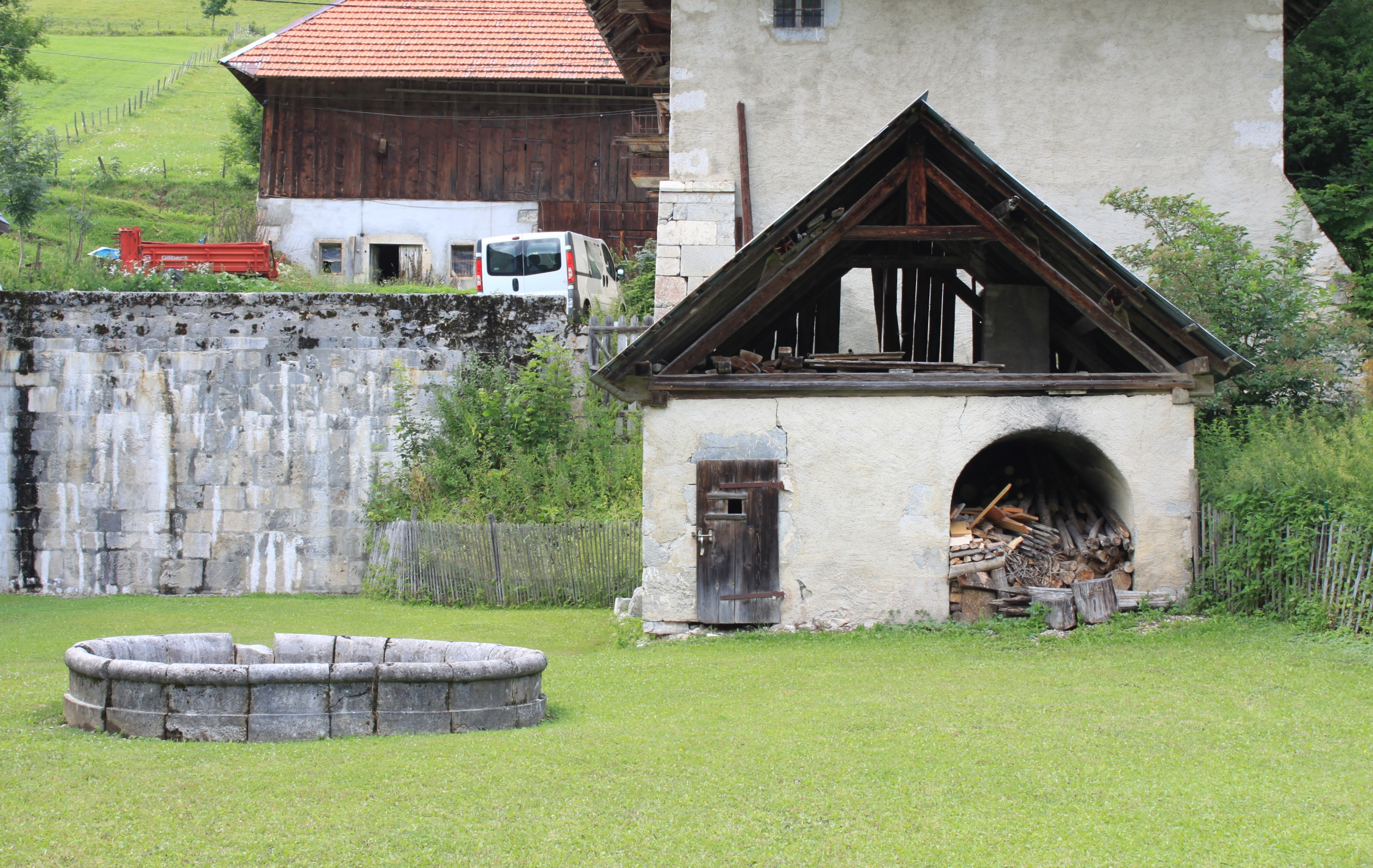
Former courtyard of the orders (July 2017).

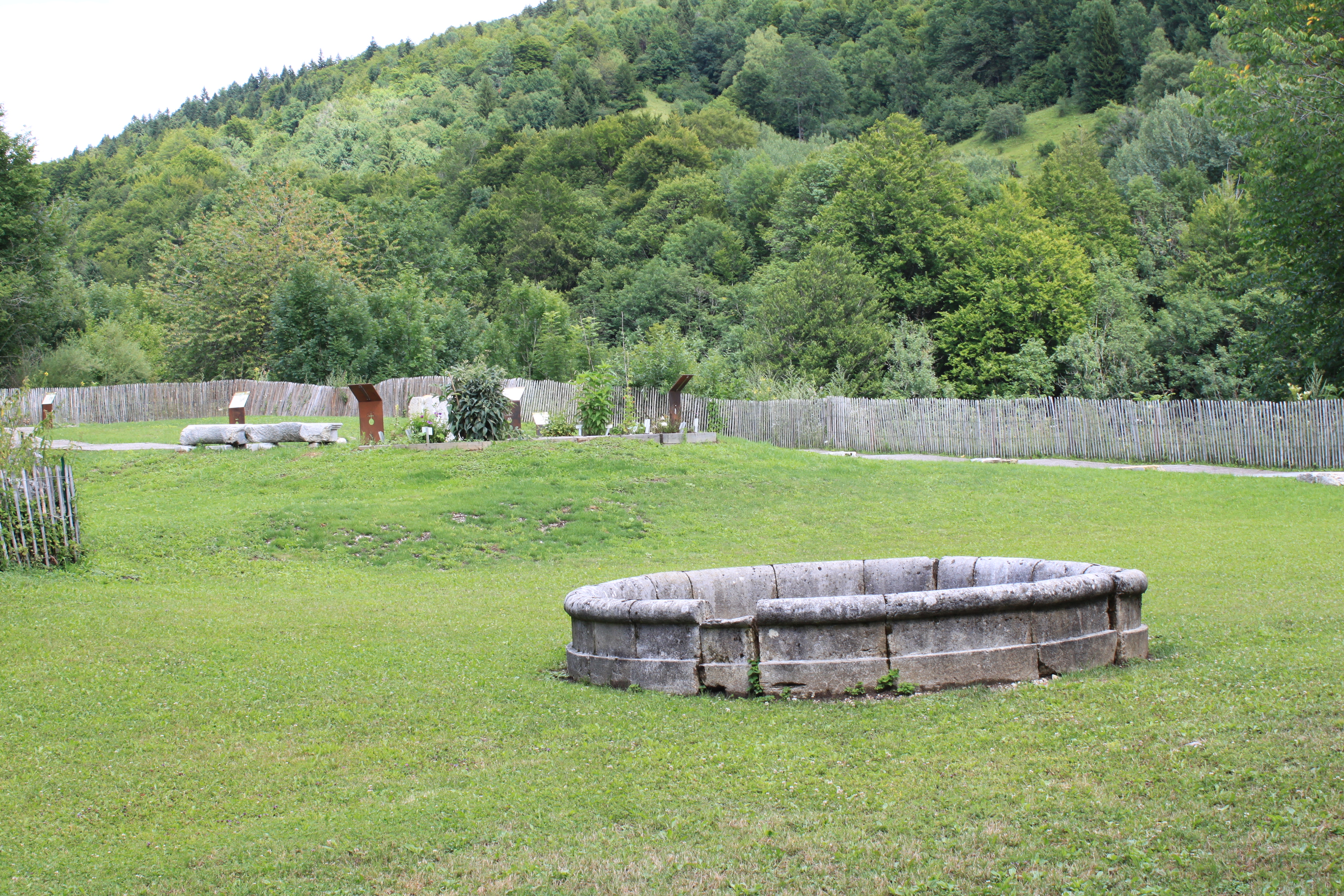
Former courtyard of the orders (July 2017).

The entrance building, also known as the guesthouse, is a 17th-century structure measuring 42 meters in length and comprising two stories. It is oriented along a northwest–southeast axis. The west façade, which faces the courtyard, features two levels of galleries. The lower level is characterized by stone basket-handle arches, surmounted by a wooden gallery. The roof, restored in 1994, is steeply pitched and covered with slate.

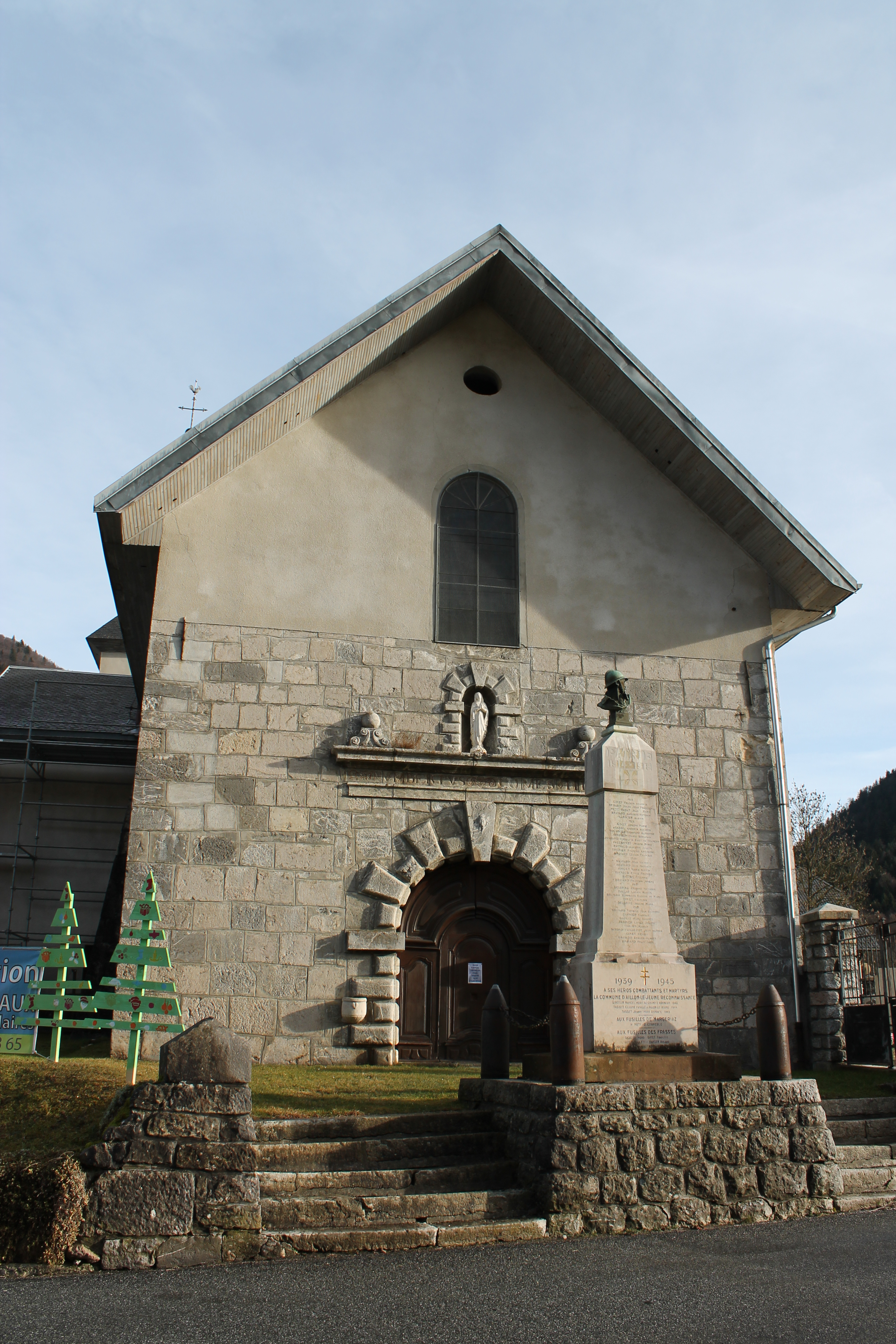
Portal of the parish church.

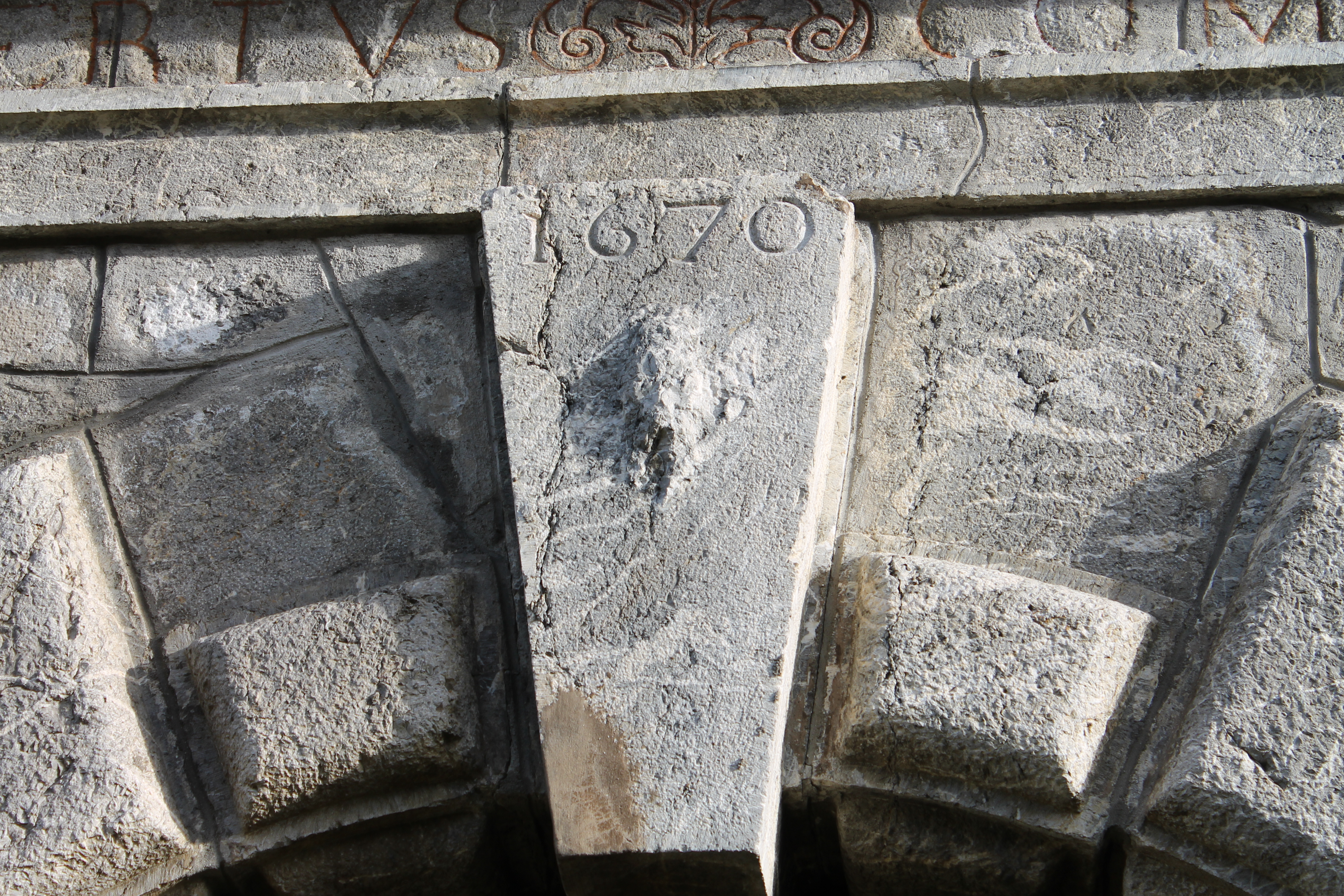
Key with the date 1670.

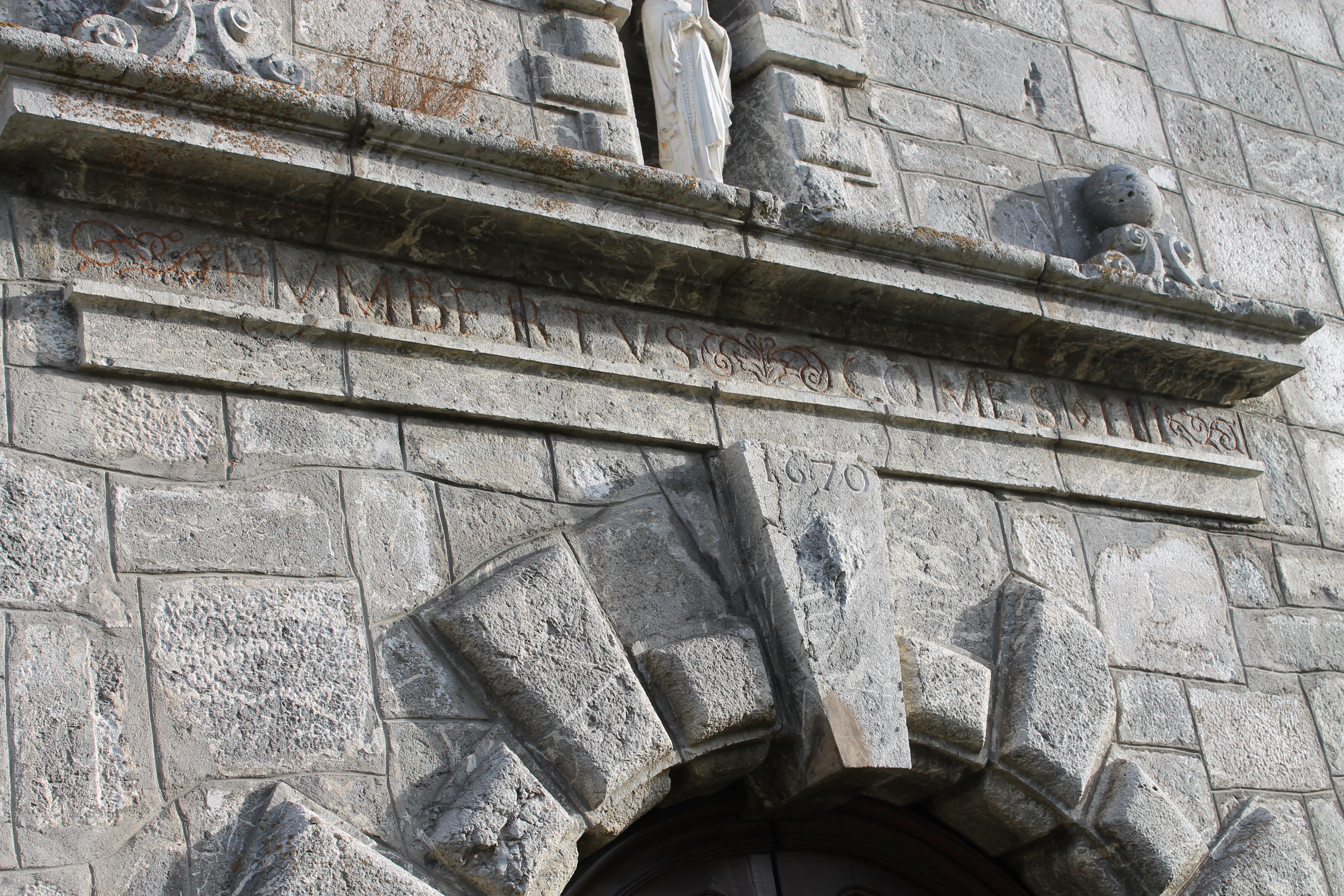
Details of the portal with Latin inscription.

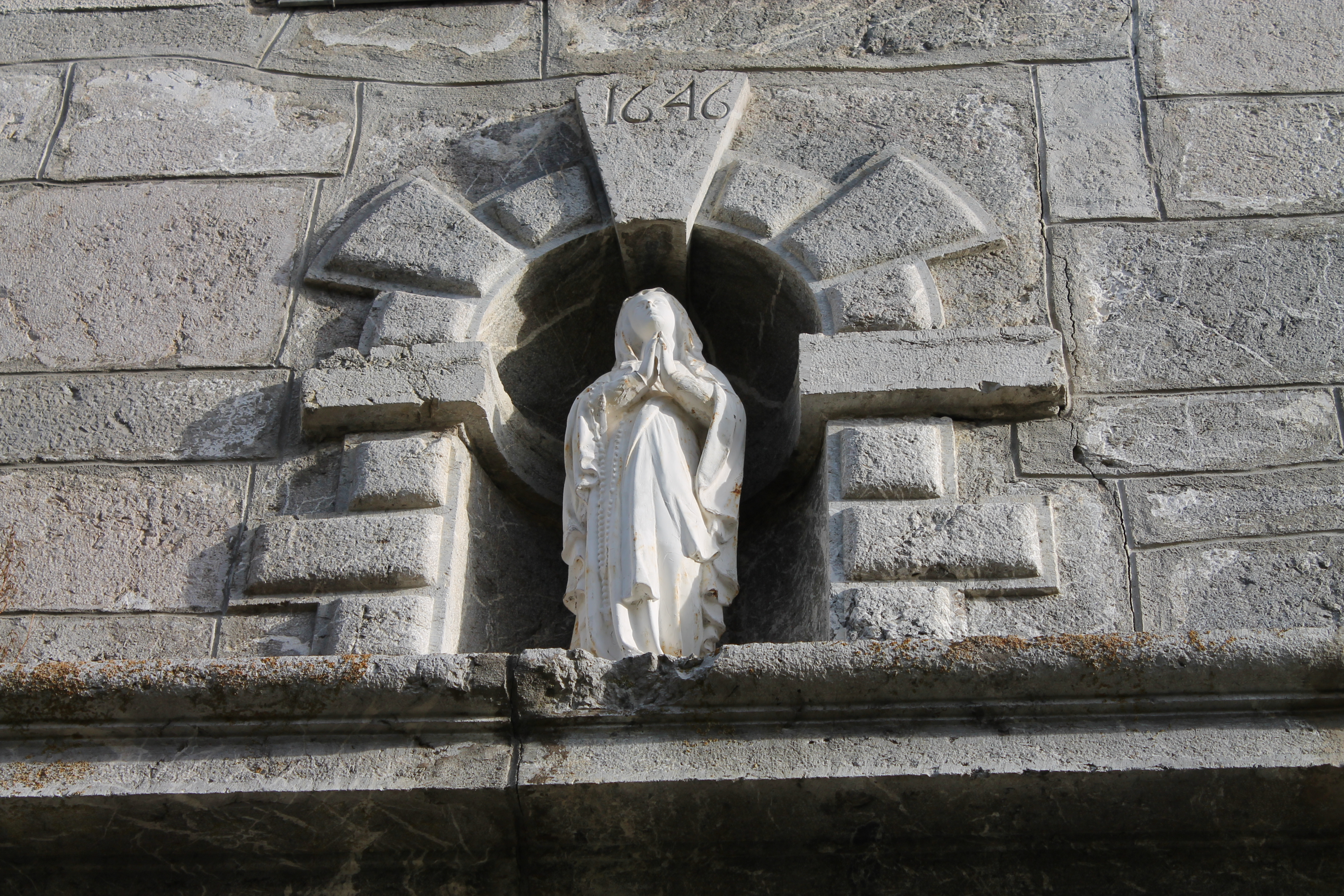
Statue of Mary and key bearing the date 1646.

The parish church of Notre-Dame-de-l’Assomption, built in 1804, retains a 17th-century portal that originally belonged to the guesthouse of the former . The pediment features two engraved dates, 1646 and 1670, along with a Latin inscription, HUMBERTUS COMES III, referencing Count Humbert III’s donation to the monastery. The door, also dating from 1670, includes a peephole that allowed the monks to observe visitors.

At the rear of the building, corresponding to the former obedience courtyard of the monastery, a circular stone basin bound with iron has been identified as an old well, although it is not connected to a water source. Excavations have revealed evidence of an irrigation system.

==== Former charterhouse ====
The monastery consisted of multiple buildings dedicated to monastic life and daily operations, including a chapel, chapter house, refectory, monks' cells, cloisters, library, kitchen, forge, and stables. The complex was organized into three main sections: the Vestibule, the Small Cloister, and the Great Cloister. (Note: Morand 1890, p. 134)

The Vestibule comprised the entrance building and the obedience courtyard. Flanking its north and south wings were the workshops, stables, chapel, dormitories for servants and lay brothers, and kitchens. This area led to the Small Cloister, a rectangular space measuring approximately 10 by 12 meters, which may have served as a site for conventual meetings. The Great Cloister functioned as a corridor providing access to sixteen individual monks' cells.

=== Lower house or Correrie ===
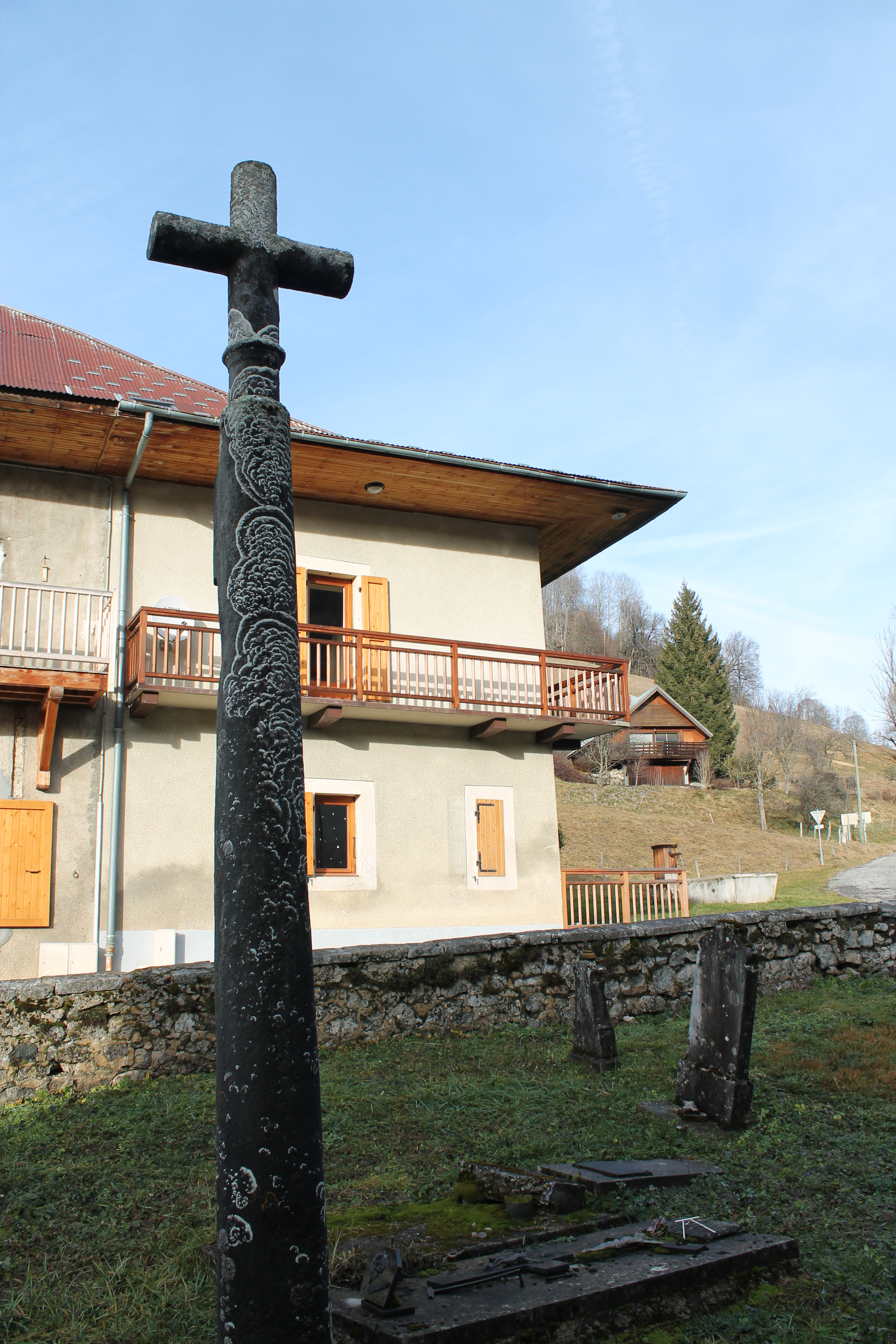
Farmhouse, cemetery, and cross at La Correrie.

==== Hamlet of the Correrie ====
The Correrie was the rural estate of the Carthusians, situated approximately 500 meters below the main Charterhouse. Referred to as the "Lower House" or procure, it housed one monk along with lay brothers. The site included a chapel, a cemetery, and a grange estate, which was among the largest agricultural holdings of the community and was noted for the production of vacherin cheese. The estate was operated by a tenant farmer (granger), who shared a portion of the produce with the monastery. The Correrie also served as a reception site for visitors and pilgrims before the construction of a guesthouse at the main monastery in the 14th century.

The cemetery likely dates to the earliest period of settlement, as evidenced by the survival of a cemetery cross. A chapel was also constructed; the current structure dates from the 17th century and was probably built by the Carthusians. Remnants of an old mill are located northwest of the chapel. Near the chapel, a circular stone basin bound with iron has been identified, similar to one found behind the surviving monastery building.

Following the occupation of the Duchy of Savoy by French revolutionary troops in 1794, the property and its buildings, including the chapel and cemetery rights, were inherited by seven families.

The site is currently owned by the commune of Aillon-le-Jeune.

==== Chapel of the Correrie ====
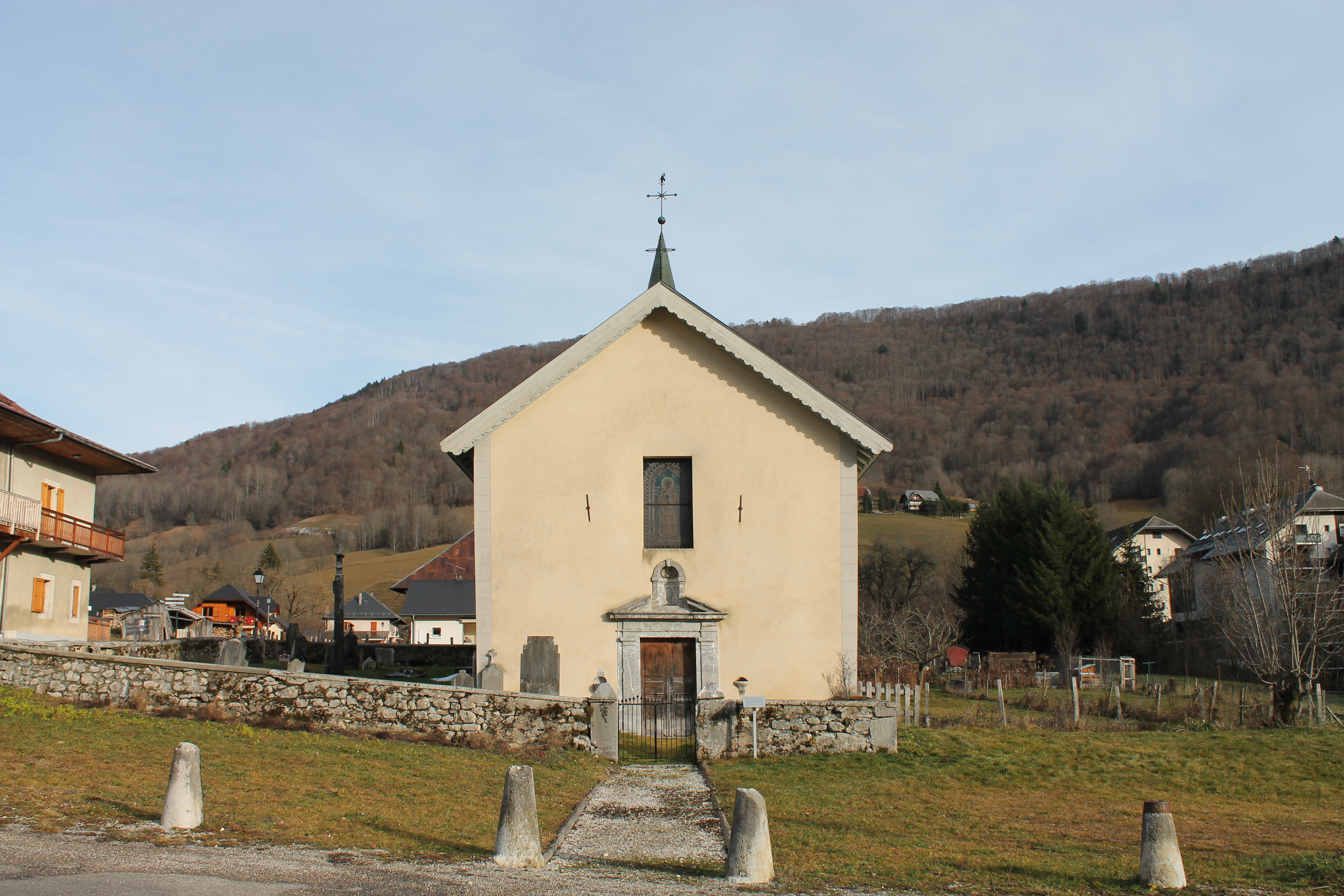
Facade and entrance.

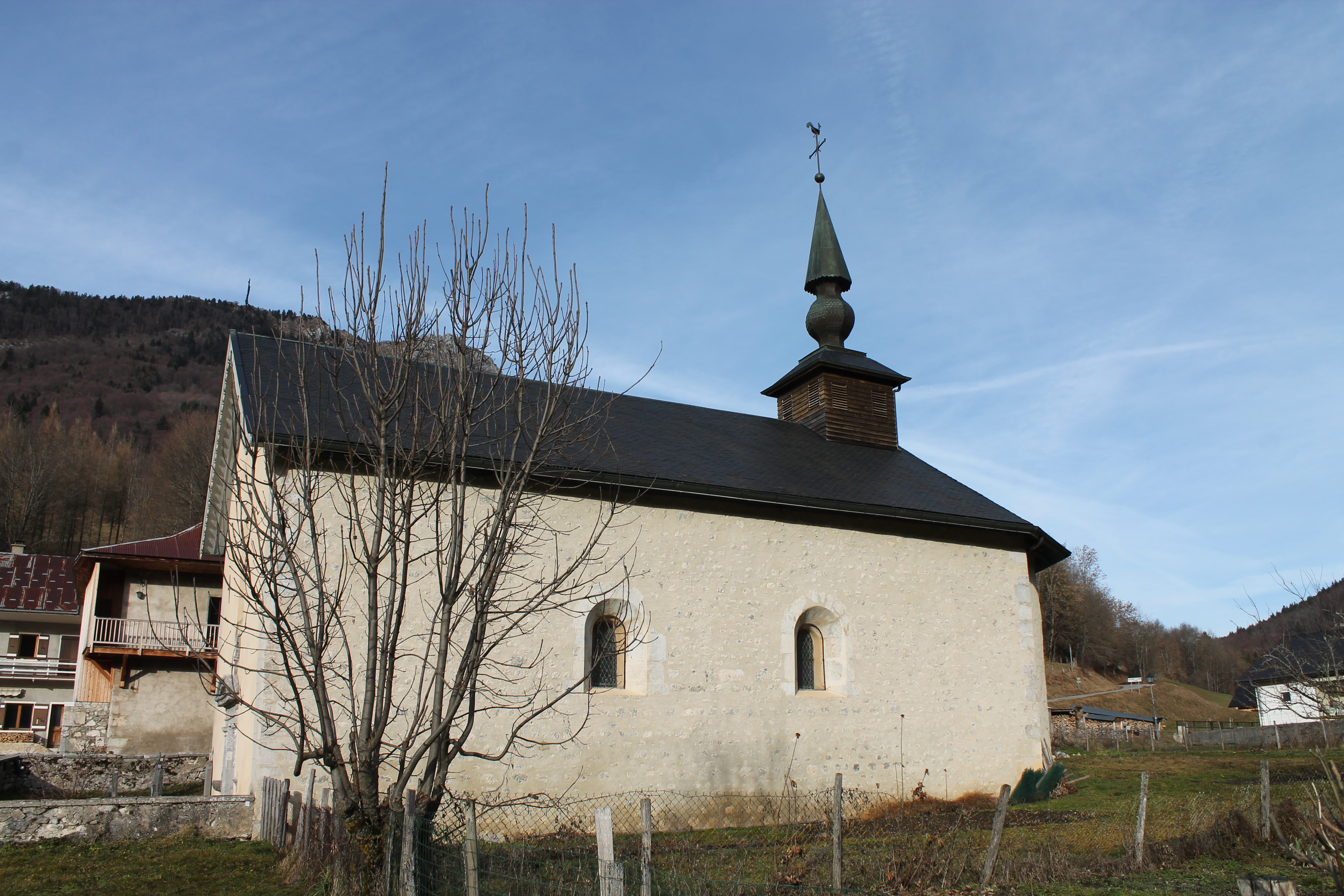
South wall.

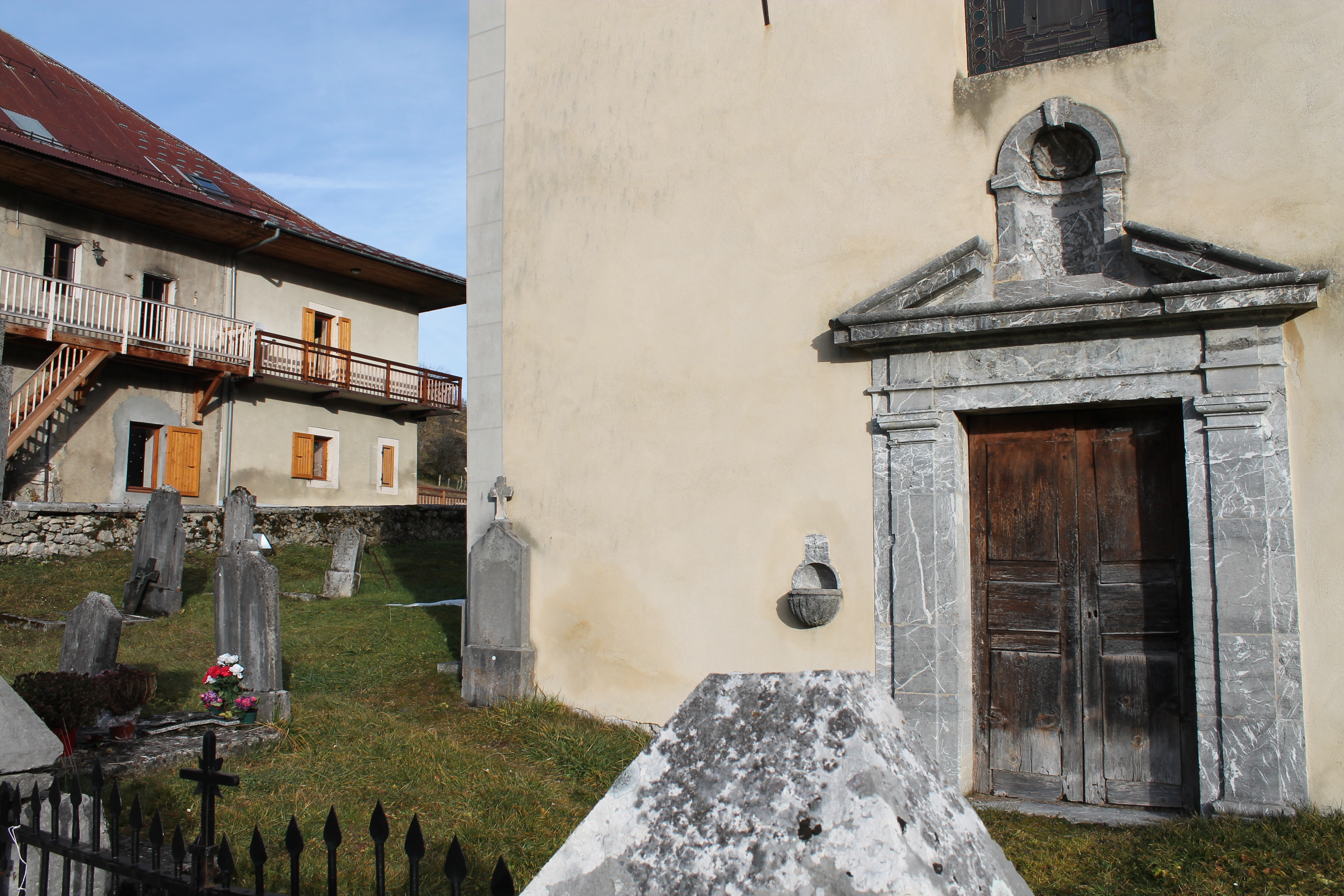
View of the entrance.

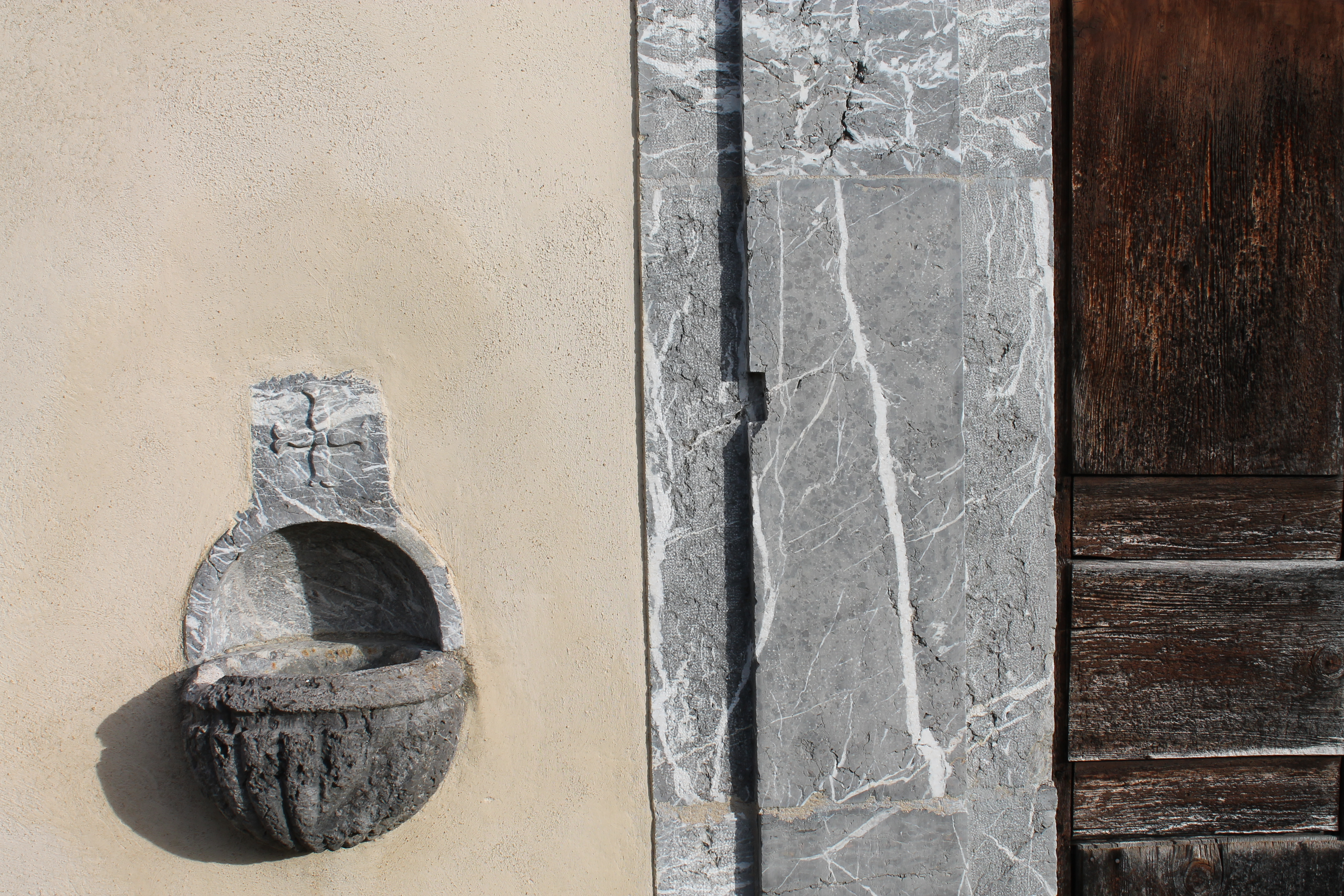
Holy water font.

The Chapel of the Correrie is a 17th-century religious structure, identifiable by the architectural style of its façade. Dedicated to the Archangel Saint Michael, it was likely constructed on the site of an earlier chapel, although no definitive sources confirm a specific date. Recent studies suggest its origins may date back to the 13th century. The chapel has a single nave, oriented west to east, measuring approximately 18 meters in length and 5 meters in width, with walls 1.8 meters thick. The interior features a pointed arch vault ending in a narrower polygonal apse, capped by a semi-dome. The structure includes four round-arched, double-splayed windows, two on each side. It is topped by an onion dome bell tower clad in copper, which was renovated in 1960.

The Baroque-style portal features a cornice with a truncated pediment and an integrated niche, surmounted by a window that appears to have been reconstructed. The interior is also characterized by Baroque decorative elements and underwent restoration in the 19th century. The interior decorations were executed by the painter Salvati. Several objects from the chapel are currently displayed in the museum of the Charterhouse.

==== Cemetery cross ====
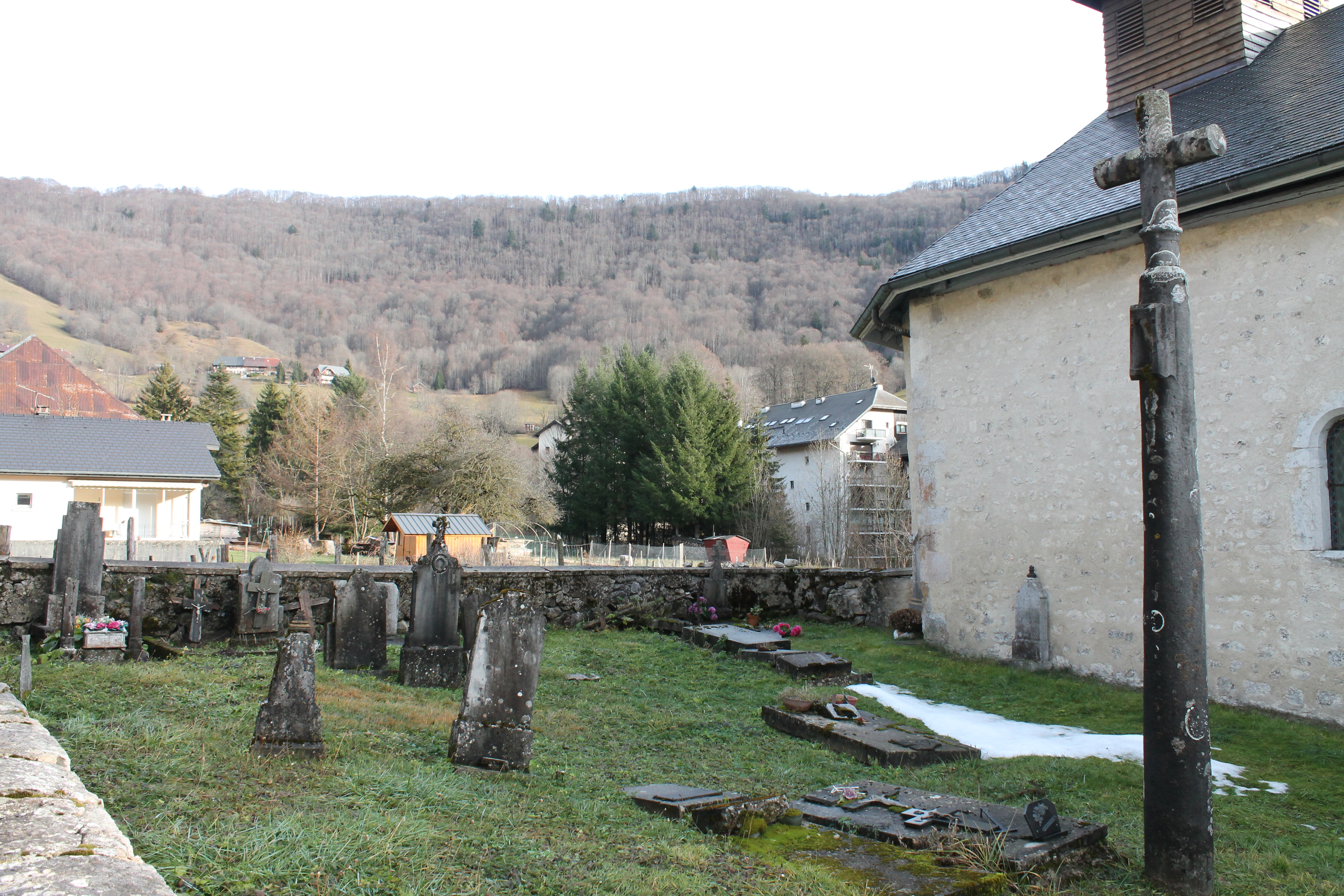
Cemetery.

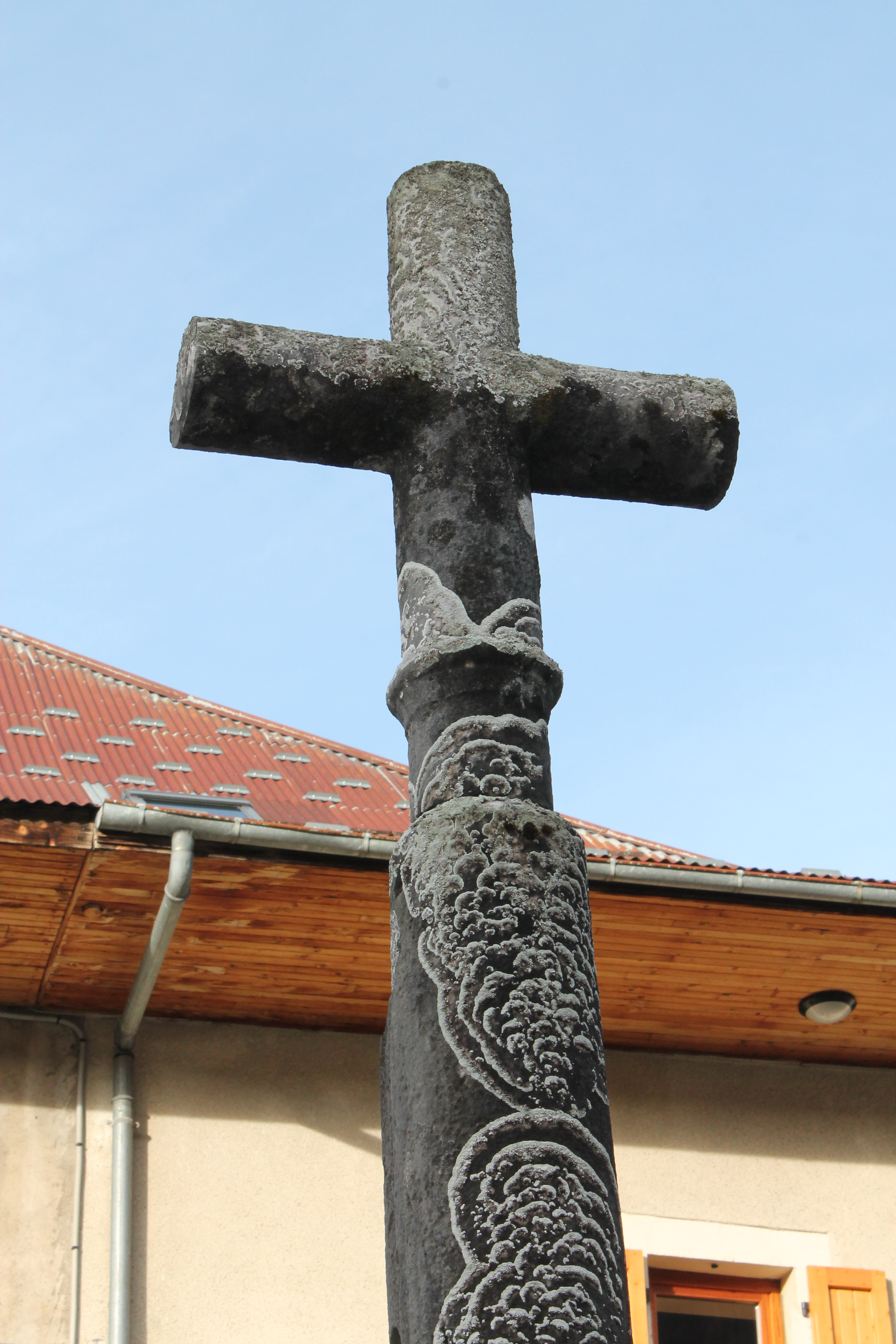
Cemetery cross.

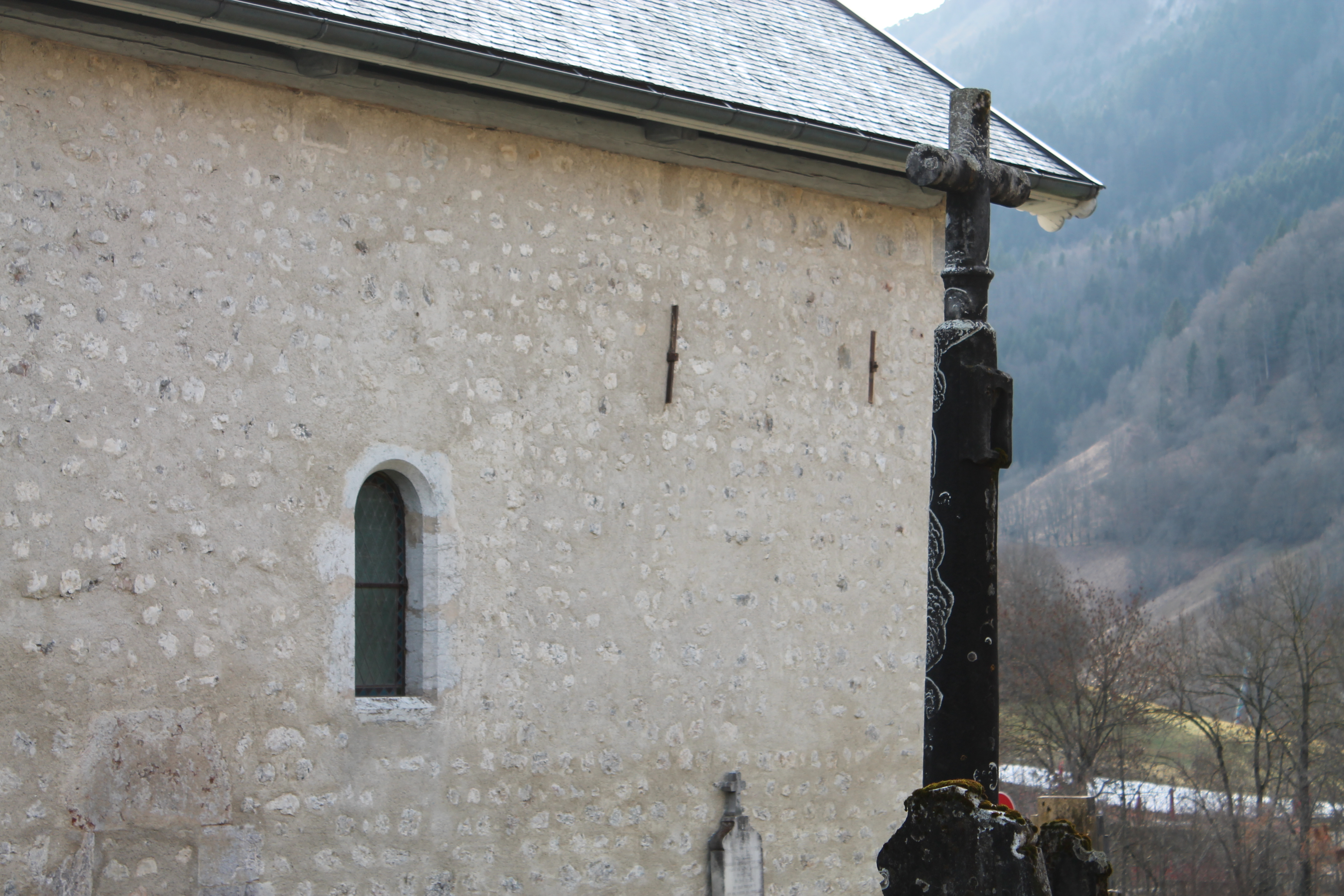
Niche.

A cemetery is located on the north side of the chapel, where several tombstones remain. A cylindrical cemetery cross, likely dating from the 13th century, still stands. Carved from a single piece of stone, it bears no inscription. The upper section features a swelling with a rectangular niche, which is currently empty.

The cross was listed in the Supplementary Inventory of Historic Monuments in 1944 and attributed to the 13th century.

== Priors of Aillon ==
The Charterhouse was administered by a prior. Abbé Laurent Morand listed several priors in his work Les Bauges: histoire et documents. Seigneurs ecclésiastiques (1890).

List of Priors
- c. 1178: Dom Guy (Guigue, Guigo). Mentioned in the founding charter as Bishop of Aosta and prior of Meyriat (Bugey). Abbé Morand considers it “more likely that he was only the organizer and held overall direction for a time.”
- After 1178: Dom Amblard. “In my opinion, the first to truly serve as prior in this newly established house.” He became prior of Le Reposoir (Faucigny) around 1220.
  - Jean, from 1188, according to the Régeste genevois.
- 1189 – after 1195: Dom Bernard de Cheinio (Note: Morand 1890, p. 232) (Bernardus). Procurator of Aillon in 1183.
- 1202: Dom Bonhomme. Removed from office, later prior of La Verne (1208).
- 1207: Dom Chabert. Returned to being a simple monk, then sacristan of the house.
- 1213 – c. 1214: Dom Falco de Curienne. Relieved of his office.
- 1215: Dom Hugues.
- 1216: Dom Jean.
- 1217: Dom Bonhomme (re-elected).
- 1220: Dom Villelme de Maurienne (Willelmus, Guillaume (Note: Lullin & Le Fort 1866, p. 157)).
- 1227: Dom Jean, relieved of his office.
- 1234: Dom Guigue de Saint-George. (Note: Morand 1890, p. 233)
- 1237 – before 1241: Dom Falco.
- 1241 – 1254/55: Dom Michel.
- 1259: Dom Robert.
- 1260: Dom Guy.
- 1269: Dom Humbert.
- 1273: Dom Guillaume.
- 1296: Unknown.
- 1296: Dom Étienne. According to Morand, likely Étienne de Gers. (Note: Morand 1890, p. 234)
- 1305: Dom Rodolphe.
- 1312: Dom Humbert de Bonneval.
- 1313: Dom Rodolphe.
- 1334: Dom Pierre.v
- 1346: Unknown (died or relieved the same year).
- 1346: Unknown.
- 1376: Dom Vionime d'Aoste. Besson mentions Jérôme de Augusta, who took possession in 1383 of Pierre-Châtel, newly acquired by the Order.
- 1393: Dom Jean de Sala. (Note: Morand 1890, p. 235)
- 1407: Jean du Molard.
- 1408: Guillaume Bernard.
- 1409: Dom Jean Périer.
- 1416: Dom Pierre Berger (Bergerii), prior of Durbon (1416–1418), of Val-Sainte-Marie or Valsainte (1418), procurator of Le Reposoir (1420–1428), prior of Valsainte (1428–1429), La Part-Dieu (1429), Le Reposoir (1430–1431), La Part-Dieu (1431–1458), and Arvière (1438–1439). (Note: Morand 1890, p. 236)
- 1416: Dom André de Belleval, former prior of Vallon (1412).
- 1418: Dom Michel Goudonier.
- 1431: Dom Pierre Gauteret.
- c. 1440: Dom Alexandre Cuignet (†1476), prior of Val-Sainte-Marie, of Bourgfontaine (1431), of Valbonne (1444–1446).
- 1444: Dom Ami. (Note: Morand 1890, p. 237)
- 1449: Dom Jean Martin, prior of Oujon (1458).
- 1449: Dom Jean Martin.
- 1452: Dom Louis Gacet, later prior of Val Saint Georges.
- 1453: Dom Pierre Tombet.
- 1459: Dom Amédée Domenge.
- 1459: Dom Pierre Cussin.
- 1467: Dom Jacques de Glivio. (Note: Morand 1890, p. 238)
- 1472: Dom Pierre Humbert, former prior of Arvière (1466–1467, 1472).
- 1476: Dom Aymont Court.
- 1479: Dom Michel du Four.
- 1480: Dom Antoine Burland, later prior and co-visitor of Le Reposoir (1484–1488), of Pierre-Châtel (1488–1492), vicar of Mélan (1492–1494), Pierre-Châtel (1494–1497).
- 1484: Dom Boniface Virgile.
- Before 1493: Dom Théofred Bellon. (Note: Morand 1890, p. 239)
- 1492: Dom Sébastien de Gabrielis.
- 1495: Dom Jacques Lichet, prior of La Part-Dieu (1499–1503).
- 1499: Dom François Beaupin, former prior of Lance (1490), of Portes (1496–1499). (Note: Morand 1890, p. 240)
- 1503: Dom Jacques Blanchin.
- 1506: Dom Jean Bourbon, relieved of his office then again prior of Chalais (Calais) (1510–1512).
- 1510: Dom Mamert Bastard, former prior of Val-Sainte-Marie or Valsainte (1491), La Part-Dieu (1497–1498), Chalais (1508–1510).
- 1513: Dom Jacques Blanchin, former prior.
- 1515: Dom Louis Dieulefit.
- 1517: Dom Pierre Colombet, former prior of Bonlieu, later prior of Pierre-Châtel (1519), vicar of Notre-Dame de Salettes, prior of Vaucluse. (Note: Morand 1890, p. 241)
- 1519: Dom Claude Tournier (Tornerii), former prior of Arvière (1497–1502), then of Le Reposoir (1502–1508).
- 1520: Unknown.
- 1521: Dom Jean Loze.
- 1537: Dom François du Chêne.
- 1540: Dom Humbert Tournier, prior of La Part-Dieu (1545–1548), of Le Reposoir (1548–1566), of Pomier (1566–1570), of Vallon (1588). (Note: Morand 1890, p. 242)
- 1541: Dom Jean Ricod, former prior of La Part-Dieu (c.1535), later of Pomier (1547–1566).
- 1547: Unknown.
- 1563: Dom Jean Machon, then prior of Pomier and visitor (1582–1584).
- 1578: Dom Jacques Besson.
- 1578: Dom Claude Bollat, prior of La Part-Dieu in 1573 and shortly before 1578.
- 1582: Dom Fiacre Billard, prior of Liget (1587–1589), (Note: Morand 1890, p. 243) removed at the 1589 chapter.
- 1587: Dom Jean Boëtte, former prior of Saint-Hugon (1581–1585), later prior of Pomier (1592–1600), probably of Saint-Hugon (1592–1600). (Note: Morand 1890, p. 244)
- 1590: Dom Pierre Bernard, former prior of Pomier (1588–1590), later of La Part-Dieu (1592).
- 1591: Dom Livinus Hasman.
- 1594: Dom Antoine Desmarest, prior of Villeneuve and visitor of the Provence province. (Note: Morand 1890, p. 245)
- c. 1599–1606: Dom Mathieu Lévin, later prior of Beaune.
- c. 1604–1616: Dom Yves Mascot.
- 1611: Dom Paul Roger, former prior of Broc, then of Bonneval, later of Arvière (c.1616).
- 1613: Dom Alphonse de Richelieu, prior of Bonpas (1620–1623). (Note: Morand 1890, p. 246)
- 1614: Dom Pierre-Thomas Croppet, former prior of Bonlieu.
- 1617: Dom André Carcatrisson, former rector (1587), then prior of Le Reposoir (1588–1590), vicar of Prémol (1590–1596), then of Notre-Dame de Salettes (1596), later prior of Arvière (1625–1626).
- 1622: Dom Pierre-Basile Carré.
- 1626: Dom Mathurin Le Brun, former prior of Bonlieu, of Montmerle, of Seillon (1618), later of La Verne (1640–1641).
- 1626: Dom Sébastien Sotic, vicar of Luvigny (1604), prior then vicar of Bonpas(1615–1617), vicar of Grande Chartreuse (1620–1625). (Note: Morand 1890, p. 247)
- 1628: Dom Antoine Lingendes.
- 1630: Dom Prosper Veillet, prior of Pomier (1638–1646).
- 1640: Dom Tossan Guenet.
- 1650: Dom Bernard Le Brun, resigned in 1685.
- 1685: Dom Daniel Privé, former prior of Bonlieu (1677), of Val-Sainte-Marie (1677–1685), later of Ripaille (1691–1694). (Note: Morand 1890, p. 248)
- 1691: Dom Paul Clavel.
- 1692: Dom Raphaël Ramel, prior of Saint-Hugon (1694–1707), of Ripaille (1707–1715), of Saint-Hugon (1715–1717), of Villeneuve (1717–1727), visitor of the Chartreuse province (1704–1717), then of Provence (1717–1727).
- 1695: Dom Jean-Charles Jaquet, former prior of Bonlieu, La Part-Dieu (1688–1695), then of La Part-Dieu (1697–1704), of Turin (1704–1705), then again of La Part-Dieu (1705–1715).
- 1698: Dom Laurent Bonot, prior of Montmerle (1705–1707), of Saint-Hugon and vicar of the Prémol nuns (1707–1713). (Note: Morand 1890, p. 249)
- 1706: Dom Antoine Dufaure, former prior of Bordeaux.
- 1706: Dom Paul Terrasson, prior of Meyriat.
- 1712: Dom Hugues de Montenard, prior of Villeneuve, of Val-Sainte-Marie, of Meyriat, of Bonpas, later again of Villeneuve and visitor of the Provence province (1727–1741).
- 1717: Dom Gabriel Lajard, prior of Vaucluse. (Note: Morand 1890, p. 250)
- 1733: Dom Emmanuel Varonard, former prior of Lugny (1725), of Sylve-Bénite (1725–1731/32), of Vaucluse (1731/32–1733), later of Ripaille (1738–1740).
- 1738: Dom André Gaulne.
- 1745: Dom Jacques Gaillard.
- 1749: Dom Gaston Guirand, prior of Portes, of Orléans, and visitor of the France-sur-Loire province (1758). (Note: Morand 1890, p. 251)
- 1750: Dom Pierre Desmurs.
- 1758: Dom Antoine Pellet.
- 1766: Dom Henri Borel, prior of Sélignac (1769–1774), then of Arvière (1774–1775).
- 1769: Dom Jean-Baptiste Jacques.
- 1788: Dom Jean-François Teyter.
- 1792: The Duchy of Savoy is annexed by revolutionary France.

== Heraldry ==

The arms of Aillon Charterhouse were blazoned: Or, an eagle sable, beaked and membered gules. These arms are visible in a painting from the Correrie of the Grande Chartreuse. According to Pierre Jacques Le Seigneur, who authored a study on the charterhouse, they are identical to the original coat of arms of the House of Savoy.

== Management and administration ==
The last remaining building of the Charterhouse was acquired and rehabilitated by the Chambéry metropolitan area. Since 2008, it has housed three facilities: a communal hall, an office for the Association for the Safeguarding of the Charterhouse of Aillon, and a cultural center known as the Maison du Patrimoine of the Bauges Massif Regional Natural Park. The park has since been designated a UNESCO Global Geopark.

The Maison du Patrimoine presents the cultural and economic heritage of the park's territory through a permanent museum exhibition within the restored building. It also hosts temporary exhibitions, workshops, and activities, particularly aimed at younger audiences.

== See also ==
- List of Carthusian monasteries
- History of Savoy in the Middle Ages
- List of historical monuments in Savoy

== Bibliography ==
- Aniel, Jean-Pierre (1983). Les maisons de chartreux : des origines à la chartreuse de Pavie [The houses of the Carthusians: from their origins to the Certosa di Pavia]. Bibliothèque de la Société française d'archéologie, Société française d'archéologie (in French). Vol. 16. Librairie Droz. pp. 111–112. ISBN 978-2-600-04617-6.
- Brocard, Michèle; Lagier-Bruno, Lucien; Palluel-Guillard, André (1984). Histoire des communes savoyardes : Aix-les-Bains et ses environs - Les Bauges - La Chartreuse - La Combe de Savoie - Montmélian [History of Savoyard towns: Aix-les-Bains and its surroundings - Les Bauges - La Chartreuse - La Combe de Savoie - Montmélian] (in French). Vol. 2. Roanne: Éditions Horvath. ISBN 978-2-7171-0310-6.
- Dantzer, Françoise (2005). Les Bauges : Terre d'art sacré [Les Bauges: Land of sacred art]. Les Savoisiennes (in French). La Fontaine de Siloé. ISBN 978-2-84206-272-9.
- Guerraz-Colonel, Janine (2010). La chartreuse d'Aillon : la magnifique solitude [The Chartreuse d'Aillon: magnificent solitude]. Beaux livres (in French). Vol. 261. Grenoble: Glénat. ISBN 978-2-7234-7188-6.
- Le Seigneur, Pierre Jacques (2008). La chartreuse d'Aillon [The Chartreuse d'Aillon]. Analecta Cartusiana (in French). Vol. 261. Institut für Anglistik und Amerikanistik.
- Lullin, Paul; Le Fort, Charles (1866). Régeste genevois : Répertoire chronologique et analytique des documents imprimés relatifs à l'histoire de la ville et du diocèse de Genève avant l'année 1312 [Genevois Register: Chronological and analytical directory of printed documents relating to the history of the city and diocese of Geneva prior to 1312.] (in French). Société d'histoire et d'archéologie de Genève.
- Morand, Laurent (1890). Les Bauges : histoire et documents : Seigneurs ecclésiastiques [Les Bauges: history and documents: Ecclesiastical lords] (in French). Vol. 2. Chambéry: Imprimerie savoisienne.
- Morand, Laurent (1891). Les Bauges : histoire et documents : Seigneurs ecclésiastiques [Les Bauges: history and documents: Ecclesiastical lords] (in French). Vol. 3. Chambéry: Imprimerie savoisienne. pp. 131–278.
