= Joux Lake Abbey =

Abbey of Lake Joux
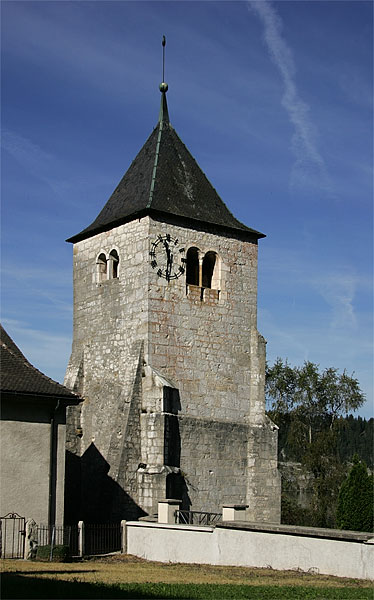
- The Aymon Tower, a remnant of the abbey

- Location within Canton of Vaud

Monastery information
- Order: Premonstratensians
- Established: between 1126 and 1134
- Disestablished: 1536
- Mother house: Saint-Martin of Laon
- Dedication: Saint Mary Magdalene
- Diocese: Lausanne

Architecture
- Status: Ruined

Site
- Location: L'Abbaye, Canton of Vaud
- Country: Switzerland
- Coordinates: 46.65024°N 6.31973°E

The Abbey of Lake Joux, now disappeared, was a monastery belonging to the Premonstratensian Order. It was located in what is now the municipality of L'Abbaye in the Canton of Vaud, Switzerland. It was dedicated to Saint Mary Magdalene. In historical documents, the monastery successively bore the names “Leonna”: (from the Lionne stream that flows through the village of L'Abbaye), “Domus Dei”, and later “Abbey of Cuarnens” before becoming known as the Abbey of the Lake or the Abbey of Lake Joux, the name under which it is known today.

== Origins ==
The earliest commonly accepted date for the foundation of the abbey is 1126. This date is based on a charter (undated) by Gérold de Faucigny, bishop of Lausanne, confirming the foundation of the Abbey of Lake Joux. The original document has been lost but appears in an eighteenth-century edition by Charles-Hyacinthe Hugo. This text indicates that the Abbey of Lake Joux was a daughter house of Saint-Martin of Laon, founded in 1124.

However, in the bull confirming the Premonstratensian Order issued by Pope Honorius II on 16 February 1126, which predates the charter, the Abbey of Lake Joux does not appear in the list of the order’s houses.

The end of the episcopate of Gérold (1134) must therefore be considered the latest possible date for the abbey’s foundation. The first mention of an abbot of Lake Joux in a document from 1135 confirms this dating. (Note: Cantonal Archives of Vaud, CIV2.) The foundation can thus be placed between 1126 and 1134.

A second document dated 1141 consists of an inventory of donations made to the abbey at the time of its foundation. It survives only in a later copy preserved in a register entitled Foundations and rights of the Abbey of Lake Joux.

A third document, dated 1149 records the benefactions granted to the young monastery by Abbot Stephen of Lake Joux. As with the other documents mentioned above, the original has been lost.

To commemorate the 900th anniversary of the arrival of the first Premonstratensians, an association dedicated to the foundation of the Premonstratensian Order at L’Abbaye du Lac-de-Joux was created. A commemorative celebration is scheduled from Friday, 29 May 2026, to Sunday, 31 May 2026.

=== Saint Norbert ===
Two versions of the Life of Saint Norbert (Note: There are two sources for the "Life of Saint Norbert".) recount the journey of the religious leader to Rome to obtain recognition for his recently founded order. It has sometimes been inferred that Norbert of Xanten must have crossed the Jura Mountains and, while passing through the Vallée de Joux, asked Gosbert (Cospert) to lead the young abbey whose creation he had helped inspire. However, these conclusions remain speculative. Although the journey to Rome in 1126 is mentioned in both texts, no route is specified. Moreover, Vita B does not list Lake Joux among Norbert’s foundations. None of the sources related to the monastery itself mentions Saint Norbert. If he had been involved in its foundation, even indirectly, such a reference would likely have been used to enhance the abbey’s prestige. Most historians therefore dismiss any direct role for Norbert of Xanten in the foundation of the Abbey of Lake Joux.,,

=== Ebal of Grandson ===
By contrast, the meeting between Norbert of Xanten and Barthélemy de Grandson (of Jur, of Joux), bishop of Laon from 1113 onward, proved decisive. The latter was the brother of Ebal I of Grandson, son of Falcon (Conon, Foulques) of Grandson and Adèle of Roucy. The young Norbert, having broken with his canon chapter in Xanten, was entrusted to him in 1119 by Pope Calixtus II. Norbert found in Barthélemy a supporter who enabled the foundation of the congregation of Prémontré, named after a village of the same name near Laon. From that point on, the bishop of Laon continued to promote the order, even long after Norbert had renounced its leadership in 1124.

His kinship with Ebal, the principal donor to the new institution, undoubtedly facilitated the foundation of the abbey in this location. The twelfth century witnessed a profound reform of monastic movements. Family networks played a key role in the establishment of religious institutions in the Jura. For local lords, it was then considered proper to support one institution or another, of which they became the protectors and lay advocates. For Ebal, who already controlled the passage of Les Clées on the road to Jougne, as well as that of Pontarlier on the Via Francigena, the region of Mollendruz and the northwestern tip of Lake Joux remained very poorly monitored and virtually uninhabited. The establishment allowed him to occupy the territory indirectly and ensure its control, since apart from the existence of a convent of a few hermits at Le Lieu-Poncet, dependent on Saint-Claude, the Valley at that time remained devoid of inhabitants: it was therefore a wilderness, well suited to the canons’ vows of work, solitude, and meditation.

It may also be supposed that Ebal sought in this way to create a rival to the Cluniac abbey of Romainmôtier, with which he was on strained terms.

Girold de Faucigny, bishop of Lausanne mentioned above, likewise had an interest in this new establishment. It enabled him to define the boundaries of his diocese, which were still unclear in these regions; thus, we can already see the emergence of the conflict between the Abbey of the Lake and that of Saint-Claude.

In the document of 1149 mentioned above, Abbot Stephen recalls the gifts granted to the abbey. These consisted of rights and territories at Cuarnens, as well as possessions around Lake Joux, extending as far as the village of Mont-la-Ville. In addition to Ebal of Grandson—recognized as the sole founder—it also presents other contributors, such as Rodolphe and Milon of Cuarnens, and Guillaume and Liétolde of Corbières. A careful study of this document shows that it is not a collection of donations made over the years, but rather a single, unified set of donations made at one time. While the Corbières and the Cuarnens were vassals of the Grandson family, they were also their relatives. It may therefore be inferred that a group of individuals made a collective donation under the leadership of Ebal of Grandson, himself encouraged by his brother Barthélemy, to establish an abbey that would allow them to control a vast territory.

== Daughter houses ==
During the eleventh and twelfth centuries, Europe was said—according to the chronicler Raoul Glaber—to be “covered with a white mantle of churches.” French-speaking Switzerland was no exception, and the Abbey of Lake Joux established several daughter houses, some of which still exist.

=== Rueyres and Bellegarde ===
The priory of Rueyres was a direct dependency of the mother house. From the twelfth century, fourteen documents relating to the Abbey of Lake Joux are known, six of which concern or mention this establishment. An interesting point is the mention of Premonstratensian nuns residing there, which would make it the only female Premonstratensian community in the region, along with that of Posat near Farvagny. Among scholars, there is confusion regarding the number of establishments bearing the name Rueyres. (Note: This does not refer to the present-day municipality of Rueyres in the Gros-de-Vaud, but rather to a locality in Lavaux.) They struggle to reach an agreement: their number varies from case to case, and it is unclear whether these were communities of men or women; they propose the following:

- A monastery of men at Bellawarda (Bellegarde) and an establishment of Norbertine nuns at Rueyres in Lavaux. They struggle to reach an agreement: their number varies from case to case, and it is unclear whether it was a community of men or women; they suggest:
- A monastery of men at Bellawarda (Bellegarde) and a Norbertine establishment at Rueyres in Lavaux.
- A single female monastery at Rueyres.
- Two establishments, both named Rueyres: the first at Bellawarda in the Jorat, the second a convent of Premonstratensian nuns near Saint-Saphorin (Lavaux).
- Two distinct monasteries (Bellawarda and Rueyres), but without specification as to gender.
- A single monastery bearing the name Rueyres.

The confusion originates from three documents dating to 1140. In the first, Guy de Maligny, bishop of Lausanne, grants the Abbey of Lake Joux a piece of land called Bellawarda, with the associated rights, located in the Jorat, to build a monastery there. In the same year, a second document informs us of the existence of a community of sisters at Rueyres. Still in 1140, a third document mentions two places named Rueyres and a piece of land in the Jorat without naming it: it is assumed to be the land of Bellegarde previously granted by Bishop Guy. By 1209, a monastery of men is attested there. These successive references have therefore led some scholars to suppose that two distinct communities existed, one of which was located at Bellegarde, since the bishop of Lausanne had granted that land for the construction of an abbey. Finally, a papal bull dated 29 September 1177, issued by Pope Alexander III, rules out the existence of a monastery at Bellegarde: “(...) a place with vineyards at Rueyres (...) as well as a piece of land in the forest of the Jorat, which was granted to you by Guy of blessed memory, formerly bishop of Lausanne (...)”- Martinet 1994, p. 33

This “land in the Jorat” is almost certainly Bellegarde, and all evidence suggests that the planned establishment was never founded there, especially since the name Bellegarde thereafter disappears from the records.

=== Humilimont ===
Humilimont Abbey was founded between 1136 and 1141 in the commune of Marsens by the lords of the same name, counts of Gruyère. At first, it housed a double monastery, but the female community was moved to Posat in 1140. The abbey was suppressed in 1580 to facilitate the establishment of the Jesuits in Fribourg.

=== Bellelay ===
The abbey was founded in 1141 by Siginand, provost of the chapter of Moutier-Grandval Abbey. Today, the eighteenth-century buildings house a psychiatric hospital.

=== Fontaine-André ===
This abbey was founded in 1143 by Richard, abbot of Lake Joux. The Premonstratensians left the abbey in 1543. Since 1954, it has belonged to the De La Salle Brothers.

=== Gottstatt ===
The abbey was founded in 1255 at Stadowe on a bend of the Thielle River. It was originally intended as a daughter house of Weissenau Abbey in Swabia. After that attempt failed, it was established by settlers from Bellelay Abbey and came under the authority of the Abbey of Lake Joux in 1279.

== Conflicts with other monasteries ==
During the late twelfth and early thirteenth centuries, the abbey found itself twice in conflict with other monastic institutions. The first dispute opposed it to the religious community of Le Lieu, the second to the Benedictines of Saint-Claude. These rivalries quickly extended beyond the local sphere, as the arbitration of the first dispute was entrusted to the bishop of Lausanne and the archbishop of Tarentaise, and the second to the archbishops of Vienna and Tarentaise. These cases were therefore more than mere local quarrels. The associated documentation also reveals the existence of the “community of Le Lieu,” previously unknown in earlier texts, and above all demonstrates the absence of any territorial or legal boundaries in this region.

=== With the convent of Le Lieu ===
The foundation of the convent of Le Lieu is often attributed to the abbey of Saint-Oyend de Joux (later Saint-Claude). Although this claim is regarded as purely speculative by Pichard, the hypothesis nevertheless remains plausible: the wave of colonization undertaken by the abbey of Saint-Oyend in the upper Jura during the 5th and 6th centuries may reasonably have led to the establishment at Le Lieu. Local sources refer to a hermit named Pontius (or Poncet) who settled there. Another hypothesis suggests the existence of a stopping place at Le Lieu between the abbeys of Saint-Oyend and Romainmôtier, the latter then being dependent on the former.

A simple dispute over fishing led in 1156 to the establishment of an “agreement concluded between Peter, Archbishop of Tarentaise, and Amédée de Clermont, Bishop of Lausanne, concerning the conflict between the brothers of Le Lieu, dependent on the abbey of Saint-Claude, and the Abbey of Lake Joux regarding Le Lieu, formerly inhabited by the hermit Poncet, and fishing rights in the lake”. The conclusions of this arbitration were binding on the convent of Le Lieu, which was effectively brought under strict control:

- The number of religious people was not to exceed ten.
- They were henceforth placed under the authority of the bishop of Lausanne.
- No religious from another monastery could be admitted.
- The monks were not permitted to own animals.
- They could fish only one day and one night per week using nets, and daily with a line.
- If the establishment at Le Lieu were to be abandoned, it would automatically revert to the Abbey of the Lake.

By placing the convent of Le Lieu under his jurisdiction, the bishop of Lausanne thus succeeded in asserting his spiritual authority over the Valley. (Note: In this arbitration of 1156, he was both judge and party.) Moreover, the restrictions imposed on the religious of Le Lieu, preventing any further growth, significantly reduced the competition they might have posed to the Premonstratensians of the abbey. Finally, since the convent of Le Lieu was to revert to the Abbey of the Lake if abandoned, the Premonstratensians were thereby recognized as the owners of Le Lieu-Poncet through this arbitration.

=== With the abbey of Saint-Claude ===
Likely perceiving the previous ruling as unfavorable, the abbey of Saint-Oyend de Joux sought its revision in Rome. In 1157, a document was issued to settle the question of possession of the Vallée de Joux between the Abbey of Lake Joux and that of Saint-Oyend. Among the arbitrators, one notes the absence of Amédée of Lausanne, replaced by the papal legate Stephen II of Vienna. It may be assumed that, since the conflict was too directly concerned with his own diocese of Lausanne, Stephen of Vienne was preferred, while Peter of Tarentaise acted only as an informant. The outcome of this second arbitration has the appearance of a compromise, yet in practice remained favorable to the Premonstratensians.

- The site of the Abbey of the Lake was granted to the Premonstratensians (Note: More precisely, the abbot of Saint-Oyend grants in perpetuity to the abbot of the Lac and his canons possession of the site on which the Abbey of the Lac is established, which he claimed as his own; however, in the event of abandonment, the abbot of Saint-Oyend would recover all the rights he had conceded.) (however, in the event of abandonment, it would revert to Saint-Oyend (Note: It was likely on the legal basis of this act of 1157, and its confirmation in 1186, that the abbot of Saint-Oyend (unsuccessfully) claimed the Abbey of the Lac when it fell into abandonment in the 14th century.)).
- Saint-Oyend retained its rights in the event of the disappearance of the convent of Le Lieu.
- The monks of the Lake acknowledged an annual obligation of one hundred sixty trout to the abbey of Saint-Oyend for fishing and grazing rights.
- Le Lieu-Poncet was ceded by Saint-Oyend to the Abbey of the Lake, on condition that the brothers of Le Lieu pay an annual rent of three sous and three pounds of wax.
- Restrictions were imposed on the construction of buildings within a previously defined territory.
- A neutral zone was established between Mouthe and Le Lieu-Poncet: no inhabitants were permitted to settle in this area. (Note: This clause prevents any growth of Le Lieu and any expansion of the Premonstratensians in this region.)

The bull of 1177 issued by Pope Alexander III states: “the place itself and the whole valley in which your abbey is established”. At first reading, this text might suggest that the convent of Le Lieu had disappeared by that date and that, in accordance with the agreement of 1156, the territory had reverted to the Abbey of the Lake. However, it may also reflect an attempt to assert the power and claims of the Abbey of the Lake at a time when the community of Le Lieu still existed. On 26 August 1186, Emperor Frederick Barbarossa confirmed the arbitration of 1157. This dispute was not definitively resolved until 1204. In the document drawn up that year, Saint-Oyend granted possession of Le Lieu-Poncet in return for an annual rent of five sous of Geneva (previously three sous and three pounds of wax). The rent was now paid by the brothers of the Lake rather than those of Le Lieu. From this, it may be inferred that the community of Le Lieu disappeared between 1157 and 1204, and that Le Lieu-Poncet passed definitively into the hands of the Premonstratensians. The text also attests to a rapprochement between the institutions. The final document relating to this dispute dates from 6 January 1220. (Note: 1220 in the Nativity Style; or 1219, if the Easter Style is used.) It states that the monks could no longer supply Saint-Oyend with trout because individuals from the abbey had stocked Lake Joux with pike, which devoured all other species. Since Saint-Oyend absolutely refused to accept pike in place of trout, the payment was converted into 45 sols of Geneva, in addition to the five sols for Le Lieu-Poncet.

=== With the abbey of Mont-Sainte-Marie ===
In the eleventh century, the various religious orders competed to promote the rule they professed. This rivalry went so far as to encourage proselytism even within communities belonging to other orders. One also sees brothers whose commitments were still uncertain abandoning their convents and joining together to found new establishments in the most unlikely places, without adhering to any particular rule. The monastery of Mont-Sainte-Marie is said to owe its foundation to such an association.

Initially, these brothers settled on Mont-du-Four near Mouthe. As they needed an ordained priest to celebrate Mass, they chose a canon of Saint Augustine who had left the abbey of Mont-Benoît for the Abbey of Lake Joux. After his death, Pierre, a chaplain of the Abbey of the Lake, resided at Mont-du-Four. Despite his efforts to persuade the lay brothers to adopt the Premonstratensian discipline, he saw them ultimately embrace the rule of Bernard of Clairvaux; he therefore left them and returned to his abbey in the Vallée de Joux. It was under the direction of his successor, Stephen (from the abbey of Billon, a daughter house of Clairvaux), that the community was raised to the rank of a Cistercian abbey in 1199. At that time, the religious left Mont-du-Four to settle in the valley between Lake Saint-Point and Lake Remoray. This new establishment, bearing the name Mont-Sainte-Marie exclusively, became one of the wealthiest abbeys in the Jura and endured until the Revolution.

However, the land on which the Cistercians had built their convent belonged to the Abbey of Lake Joux. The latter, through its abbot Humbert, therefore claimed superiority over the establishment of Mont-Sainte-Marie as well as ecclesiastical authority over it. As might be expected, the Cistercians strongly rejected this claim. The inquiry of 8 July 1228 recalled the above facts but produced no result. The matter was therefore referred to the Holy See, which instructed the abbot of Saint-Maurice and the prior of Ollon to settle the dispute. Aymon de Grandson (Note: Aymon II of Grandson was the son of Ebal IV, hereditary advocate of the Abbey of the Lac de Joux, and the grandson of Ebal I. He served as Bishop of Geneva from 1215 to 1260.) then offered his services, and a settlement was reached in October 1230. Abbot Humbert renounced all his claims in exchange for compensation of thirty-five livres estevenantes paid by the abbey of Mont-Sainte-Marie. Thereafter, the two abbeys lived in mutual harmony.

== The lands of the monastery ==
A large portion of the sources relating to the Abbey of Lake Joux concern land transactions, and especially donations made to the monastery. Beyond their propagandistic value for the donors, the number and extent of these benefactions clearly testify to the popularity enjoyed by the Premonstratensians in the region at the time. The inventory of 1141 records that the abbey possessed at that date (Note: For the sake of brevity, this list includes only landed properties. It does not mention the rents and tithes generated by these properties, nor the rights collected from various activities (fishing, milling, etc.).)

- In the Valley: meadows and arable lands around the lake, from the summit of Mont Tendre to the Risoud.
- At Cuarnens: the church and the manorial mill.
- At La Coudre: the Val-Molon.
- Lands at Bellevaux (Bellawarda), Rueyres (commune of Chardonne) (see above), Mont-la-Ville, Villars-Bozon, Ferreyres, Villars-Lussery, Suscévaz, and Mathod.
- Vineyards and lands at Trévelin, Colombier-sur-Morges, and Saint-Saphorin-sur-Morges.

Most of these lands were in fact uncultivated and had to be developed. Abbot Pierre de Pont and his successor Thierry (Theodoric) established conventual or rural settlements at various points within the abbey’s territory. These were headed by canons from the abbey, assisted by a few lay brothers. Such establishments were called “granges” (grangiæ) when their function was purely agricultural. Only a single canon, known as the magister, resided there, responsible for overseeing the operation. This was the case for the granges of Cuarnens, Saint-Saphorin-sur-Morges, Trévelin, and others. Some of these granges were later converted into religious communities, whose head bore the title of “prior” (prior). (Note: See: Rueyres)

The bull of 1177, which lists the abbey’s possessions, shows that within 34 years the donations of the faithful had continued to increase. The complete list of these offerings from local lords indicates that they now consisted rather of good arable land, vineyards, and even chestnut groves. The abbey’s domain thus enabled it to provide for its own subsistence as well as that of the many settlers it employed. (Note: Under feudal law, the transfer of land automatically included the peasants who worked it, along with their families. Bound to work to survive, they became inextricably attached to the estate, regardless of its owner. This practice, which later became an obligation, gave rise to the much-detested mortmain of the Ancien Régime.)

Colonization

On 5 December 1304, the abbot of the Lake, Pierre I, granted in abergement (a form of hereditary lease) to a man named Perrinet Bron several plots of land that had remained deserted since the departure of the monks from the convent of Le Lieu. With him—considered the first lay inhabitant of the Vallée de Joux—the colonization of the valley began. Until then, the Valley had been inhabited only by religious communities. Except for the meadows around the abbey and a few fields cultivated by the servants of the monks, the entire territory still consisted of the “dark Joux,” impenetrable and filled with marshy hollows.

The wealth of the lords of La Sarraz enabled them to restore the abbey. It was Aymon II of La Sarraz who undertook the task, rebuilding the church of Mary Magdalene in stone and adding a tall tower bearing his coat of arms. A manuscript recounts this event: “The lord Amé of La Sarraz, prudent and steadfast (persevering), through great diligence in litigation, though not without great expense and cost, restored and refounded for the second time the said abbey in such good condition that thereafter, both through the good governance of the abbots who followed and with the aid of the said lord, it has been and remains in good state—may God preserve it.”

In the same century, in 1344, Louis II of Savoy purchased the Vallée de Joux. The Combe of the Abbey, under the authority of the lords of La Sarraz, and the Combe of Le Lieu, subject to the castle of Les Clées and governed by its castellan François I of La Sarraz, brought the entire valley on both sides of the Orbe River under a single lord. Gradually, the Vallée de Joux thus passed from the domains of the Crown to those of the lords of La Sarraz, and from them to the House of Savoy, thereby coming entirely under the regime of the abbey, which held these lands in fief from the Prince of Savoy. (Note: Subject, however, to the important caveat of the (successful) falsification of documents by the La Sarraz family (Martinet (1994). L'abbaye du Lac de Joux : histoire et documents. pp. 51–83, 96–97.), discussed in detail on the Vallée de Joux page.) The following century would see the development of craftsmanship on the abbey’s lands: after the construction of the mill at Le Lieu, a second mill as well as a sawmill were built near the abbey.

== Decline and suppression ==
With Abbot Jean de Lutry came the first difficulties for the abbey. Having freed himself from the direct control of the lords of La Sarraz over the administration of the monastery, he proved to be very spendthrift and brought the abbey to the brink of ruin. Aymon de Montferrand, then lord of La Sarraz, appealed to the Premonstratensian Order to present his grievances. As early as 1323, envoys of the Order came to the monastery and authorized Aymon to set back on the right path “certain canons who were of poor conduct and dissolute… and if they would not desist from their errors, that he should seize them and send them to Prémontré or elsewhere, to receive punishment according to their demerits.” Dissatisfied at being subjected once again to the lord of La Sarraz, Jean de Lutry revived the old disputes with the abbey of Saint-Claude. Informed of these maneuvers, the abbot of Notre-Dame de Dilo came to Lake Joux to pronounce the expulsion of Jean de Lutry, as well as of the canons Nicolas de Morges and Jacob des Clées.

At the time of the election of Humbert, known as Belvas of Fribourg, a crime would tarnish the abbey. Jean Cuastron, then prior and a rival of Humbert, took his defeat badly. He plotted to assassinate the abbot and, to this end, enlisted the help of a young cleric named Perrod of Le Lieu. He supplied him with poison, which the novice administered to Humbert and to his brother Conrard. The latter died shortly thereafter. Immediately alerted, Jean de Rossillon, bishop of Lausanne, ordered an investigation, which quickly revealed the names of the two culprits. Vuillelme de Pampigny and Jean de Daillens, officers of the bishop, came to the abbey to seize Jean Cuastron. Aymon II of La Sarraz, exercising his right of jurisdiction, claimed Jean Cuastron and had him handed over to the Premonstratensian inquisitors on 3 March 1336.

In 1336, Louis de Senarclens succeeded Abbot Humbert. On 10 August 1364, the Abbey of Lake Joux was attacked by a group of peasants from Romainmôtier. The monks of the monastery were mistreated, and Abbot Louis de Senarclens immediately lodged a complaint before the court of the bailliage of Vaud, requesting punishment of the attackers and substantial damages.

During the wars involving the Burgundian States, the Swiss Confederates, and Charles the Bold, the abbey saw Bernese troops appear at its gates on 22 March 1536. Abbot Claude Pollens, along with several of the religious around him, embraced the Protestant Reformation. Those who refused departed for the monastery of Humilimont. The monastery’s property was then dispersed. Clauda de Gilliers, baroness of La Sarraz, reclaimed the assets of the parishes of Cuarnens, Orny, and Saint-Didier (now Saint-Loup); the latter two localities divided among themselves the abbey’s ornaments and liturgical vestments, while the remaining possessions—such as mills, fulling mills, and sawmills—were distributed among private individuals. As the Vallée de Joux gradually became settled by inhabitants from Le Lieu, those who had established themselves on the other side of the lake formed a community named L’Abbaye by an act dated 7 October 1571.

Thus came the end of the Abbey of Lake Joux after 450 years of dominance over the valley, having made it suitable for settlement, fostering hamlets that would become villages and towns, and ensuring its subsistence by clearing lands long neglected by human habitation.

== List of abbots ==
The complete list of the abbots of Joux varies according to the authors. Among the “earlier” scholars, Gingins-la-Sarra in 1842 identifies 32. Lucien Reymond simply reproduces Gingins’s text in his Notice sur la vallée de Joux (1887). More recently, the Dictionnaire historique by Mottaz (1914–1921) also identifies 32, though with some variations. Piguet (1924) and Backmund (1949–1956) recognize 36. Nevertheless, a few observations are in order:

- Gosbert (Gôsber, Cospert), generally regarded as the first abbot, is in fact mentioned only in the document of 1141, and as the “builder of the site,” not as an abbot or prior. He should therefore not be included in the list.
- The same observation applies to Claude d’Estavayer, who most likely was never abbot of Lake Joux.

	Gigins-La Sarra 1842 Reymond 1887	DHV 1914	Piguet 1924 Backmund 1949
(1)	1135 Pierre de Pont	1126 Gosbert	1126 Gosbert
(2)	1141 Theodoric (Thierry)	1141 Thierry	1135 Pierre I de Pont
(3)	1144 Richard	1144 Richard	1141 Theodoric (Thierry)
(4)	1149–1157 Stephen	1149–1157 Stephen	1144 Richard
(5)	1168 Gauthier / Walther	1180 M.	1149–1157 Stephen (Stephanus)
(6)	1193 Nicholas I	1193 Nicholas	1168 Gauthier (Gualterus, Walther)
(7)	1215–1217 Gaymar	1215–1217 Guaymar	1180 M…
(8)	1219 Humbert	1219–1247 Humbert	[?] Nanthelme
(9)	1244 Willerme	1249–1261 Vuillerme	1193 Nicholas I
(10)	1250 Jean de Brétigny	1263–1265 Gui	1210–1211 Louis I
(11)	1287 Raoul	1273–1278 Jean de Brétigny	1215–1217 Gennaro (Gaymarus)
(12)	1294 Jean II	1283–1289 Rodolphe de Monnaz	1244 Humbert I
(13)	1301 Nicholas II	1294 Jean	[?] Willerme I (Guillaume)
(14)	1304 Pierre I	1301 Nicholas	[?] Guido
(15)	1314 Wuillelme II known as Boniz	1302–1318 Pierre	1250–1278 Jean de Brétigny
(16)	1319 Raymond	1314 Vuillerme Beniz	1281–1285 Rodolphus, known as Moneyr (Monnaz) (Note: Piguet (1924). Histoire de la Vallée de Joux. only.)
(17)	1322–1330 Jean de Lutry	1319 Reymond	1287 Raoul
(18)	1330–1333 Jaques Bonet	1322–1324 Jean de Lutry	1294 Jean II
(19)	1334–1336 Humbert, known as Belvas	1327–1333 Jaques Bonnet	1301 Nicholas II
(20)	1336–1369 Louis de Senarclens	1334–1336 Humbert Belvaz	1304 Pierre II de Vennes
(21)	1370–1384 Pierre de Romainmôtier	1336–1369 Louis de Senarclens	1314 Willerme II known as Boniz
(22)	1385–1419 Henry de Romainmôtier	1370–1383 Pierre Mayor	1319 Raymond
(23)	1419–1426 Jean de Romainmôtier, known as de Jougne	1385–1419 Henri Mayor	1322–1330 Jean III de Lutry
(24)	1427–1457 Guillaume de Bettens	1419–1423 Jean de Jougne	1330–1333 Jaques I Bonet
(25)	1458 Nicholas de Gruffi	1427–1457 Guillaume de Bettens	1334–1336 Humbert II Belvas
(26)	1480 Jean Pollens	1458–1475 Nicholas de Gruffi	1336–1369 Louis II de Senarclens
(27)	1484–1509 Jean de Tornafoll	1480–1484 Jean Pollens	1370–1384 Pierre III Mayor de Romainmôtier
(28)	1509 Aymonet Jaquet	1483–1511 Jean de Tornafoll	1385–1419 Henri Mayor de Romainmôtier
(29)	1513 Jaques Varney (Varnier)	1509 Aymon Jaquet	1419–1426 Jean IV de Jougne
(30)	1517–1519 Jean-Claude d'Estavayer	1513–1519 Jaques Warney	1427–1457 Guillaume III de Bettens
(31)	1519–1534 Claude d'Estavayer	1519–1534 Claude d'Estavayer	1458 Nicholas II de Gruffy
(32)	1536 Claude Pollens, known as Bessonis	1536 Claude Pollens	1480 Jean V Pollens
(33)			1484–1509 Jean VI de Tornafoll
(34)			1509 Aymon Jaquet
(35)			1513 Jaques II Varnier
(36)			Claude I d’Estavayer (Note: Backmund, Norbert (1949–1956). Monasticon Praemonstratense. Straubing: de Gruyter. only.)
(36)			1536 Claude II Pollens known as Besson

== See also ==
- Vallée de Joux
- Premonstratensian Order
