= Pomier Charterhouse =

Carthusian monastery in Haute-Savoie, France

Coordinates: 46°4′55″N 6°6′20″E

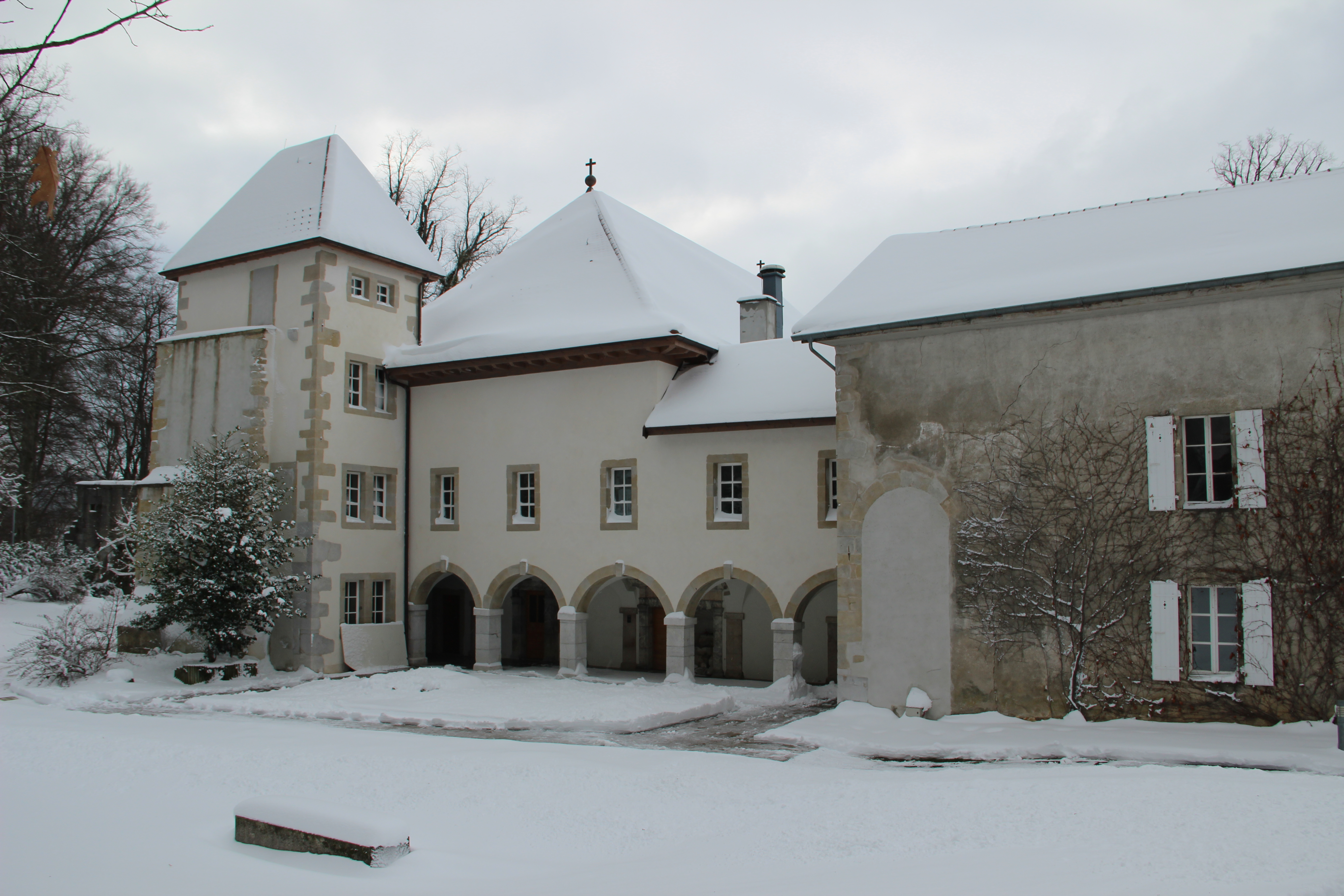
- Exterior of Chartreuse de Pomier, photographed in winter 2012

Religion
- Affiliation: Carthusian
- Region: Auvergne-Rhône-Alpes

Location
- Location: Presilly, France

Pomier Charterhouse (Chartreuse de Pomier) was a Carthusian monastery in Pomier, Présilly near Annecy, Haute-Savoie, in France, close to the Swiss border. It is situated on the foot of the Salève, and on the Way of St. James.

== History ==
The charterhouse was founded in 1170 by William I, Count of Geneva, and was subsequently used as a place of burial by a number of Counts of Geneva and Vaud. It was visited by the Emperors Sigismund and Charles IV, who put it under Imperial protection. In the course of its history it had 91 priors.

In 1793 it was pillaged during the French Revolution, and the religious structures ruined; the site was sold off into private ownership. At various times it was used for the production of pottery and as a brewery, before being put to agricultural uses. In 1894, Jérémie Girod bought the site from the then owner, the Baron de Drée, and from the ruins was able to restore the main building for use as an hotel, which under the name Hôtel Pension Abbaye de Pomier remained in business till 1991. The present and newly restored Chartreuse de Pomier, consisting of the cellars, and the chapter rooms on the ground floor, is now an event and conference venue.

== Sources ==
- Chartreuse de Pomier website: history
- Postcard of the Hôtel Pension Abbaye de Pomier, c. 1900 (in French)
