= Mont Colombier =

Mountain in France

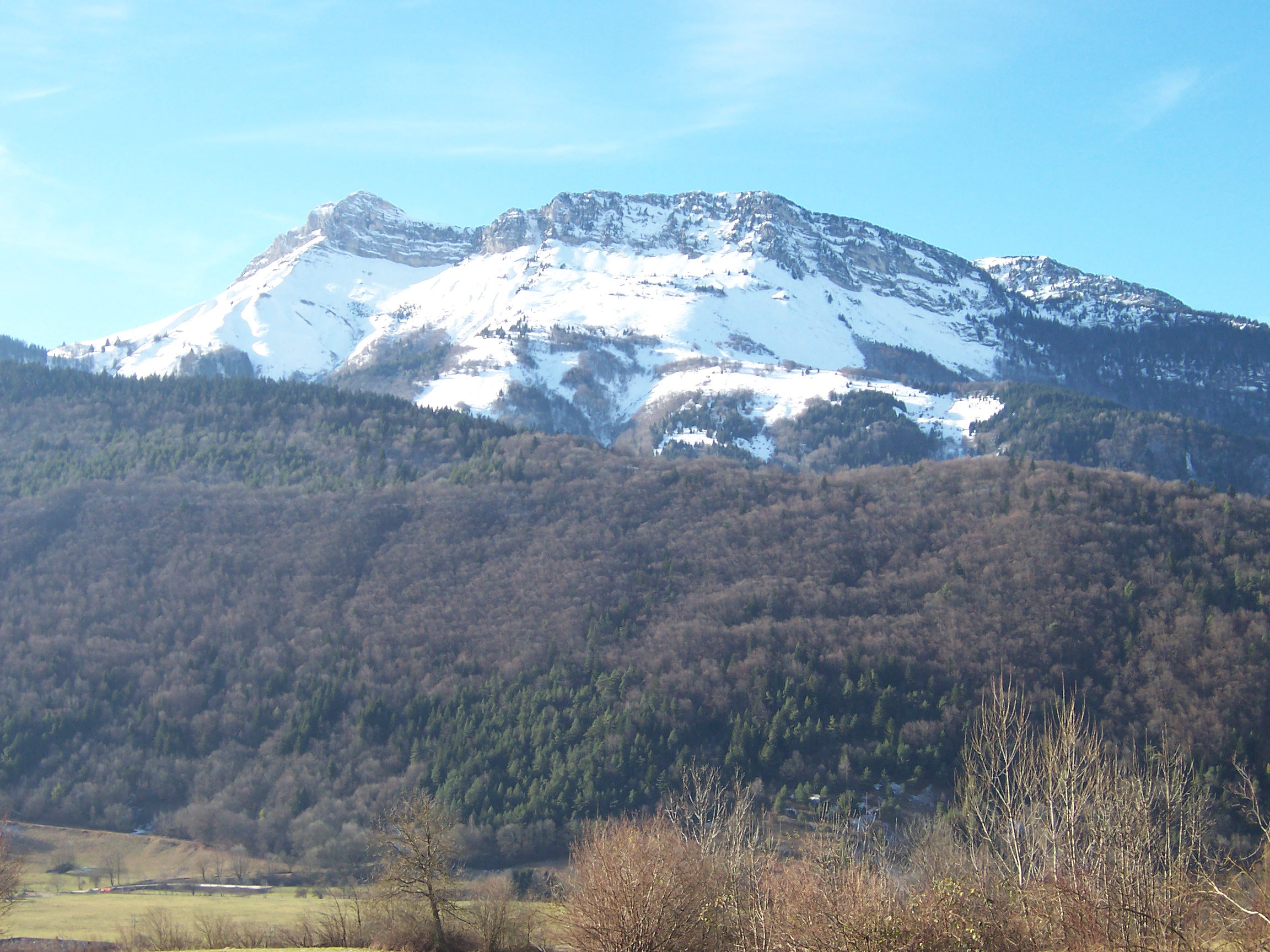
- Mont Colombier

Highest point
- Elevation: 2,043 m (6,703 ft)
- Prominence: 1,095 m (3,593 ft)
- Coordinates: 45°38′40″N 06°07′10″E

Geography
- Location within Alps
- Location: Savoie, France
- Parent range: Bauges Massif

Geology
- Rock age: Tertiary

Mont Colombier (2,043 m) is a mountain of the Bauges Massif in the French Prealps in Savoie, France.
