= List of French mountains by prominence =

The following is a sortable table of the 37 peaks of continental France with a topographical prominence of at least 1,000 metres (3,300 ft).

This table includes all ultras with prominence of at least 1,500 m (4,900 ft) within continental France. Mountains located on islands and overseas departments are not included.

== Mountains of continental France ==
| Rank | Name | Height | | Prominence | | Coordinates | Range | Subrange |
| Rank | Name | m | ft | m | ft | Coordinates | Range | Subrange |
|---|---|---|---|---|---|---|---|---|
| 1 | Mont Blanc | 4,808 | 15,774 | 4,695 | 15,404 | 45°49′57″N 06°51′52″E | Alps | Graian Alps |
| 2 | Barre des Écrins | 4,102 | 13,458 | 2,045 | 6,709 | 44°55′21″N 06°21′36″E | Alps | Dauphiné Alps |
| 3 | Chamechaude | 2,082 | 6,831 | 1,771 | 5,810 | 45°17′17″N 05°47′24″E | Alps | Savoy Prealps - Chartreuse Mountains |
| 4 | Arcalod | 2,217 | 7,274 | 1,713 | 5,620 | 45°40′54″N 06°13′42″E | Alps | Savoy Prealps - Bauges |
| 5 | Pointe Percée | 2,750 | 9,020 | 1,643 | 5,390 | 45°57′20″N 06°33′22″E | Alps | Savoy Prealps - Aravis Range |
| 6 | Puy de Sancy | 1,885 | 6,184 | 1,575 | 5,167 | 45°31′42″N 02°48′51″E | Massif Central | |
| 7 | Grande Tête de l'Obiou | 2,790 | 9,150 | 1,542 | 5,059 | 44°46′32″N 05°50′23″E | Alps | Dauphiné Prealps |
| 8 | La Tournette | 2,351 | 7,713 | 1,514 | 4,967 | 45°49′38″N 06°17′11″E | Alps | Savoy Prealps - Bornes Massif |
| 9 | Le Taillefer | 2,857 | 9,373 | 1,490 | 4,890 | 45°02′23″N 05°55′30″E | Alps | |
| 10 | Aiguilles d'Arves | 3,514 | 11,529 | 1,433 | 4,701 | 45°07′38″N 06°20′13″E | Alps | Dauphiné Alps |
| 11 | Puigmal | 2,909 | 9,544 | 1,331 | 4,367 | 42°29′47″N 02°05′37″E | Pyrenees | |
| 12 | Grande Casse | 3,855 | 12,648 | 1,305 | 4,281 | 45°24′19″N 06°49′40″E | Alps | Graian Alps - Vanoise Massif |
| 13 | Pica d'Estats | 3,143 | 10,312 | 1,281 | 4,203 | 42°42′43″N 00°57′23″E | Pyrenees | |
| 14 | Mont Chaberton | 3,131 | 10,272 | 1,281 | 4,203 | 44°57′53″N 06°45′06″E | Alps | Cottian Alps |
| 15 | Pic de Bure | 2,709 | 8,888 | 1,268 | 4,160 | 44°37′38″N 05°56′07″E | Alps | |
| 16 | Crêt de la Neige | 1,720 | 5,640 | 1,267 | 4,157 | 46°16′49″N 05°57′16″E | Jura | |
| 17 | Le Môle | 1,863 | 6,112 | 1,251 | 4,104 | 46°06′25″N 06°27′24″E | Alps | Savoy Prealps - Chablais Alps |
| 18 | Dent Parrachée | 3,697 | 12,129 | 1,180 | 3,870 | 45°17′21″N 06°45′23″E | Alps | Graian Alps - Vanoise Massif |
| 19 | Pic Bayle | 3,465 | 11,368 | 1,175 | 3,855 | 45°08′16″N 06°08′09″E | Alps | |
| 20 | Grand Veymont | 2,341 | 7,680 | 1,165 | 3,822 | 44°52′12″N 05°31′36″E | Alps | |
| 21 | Dent de Cons | 2,062 | 6,765 | 1,155 | 3,789 | 45°43′47″N 06°21′06″E | Alps | Savoy Prealps - Bauges Massif |
| 22 | Mont Ventoux | 1,909 | 6,263 | 1,148 | 3,766 | 44°10′26″N 05°16′42″E | Alps | Provence Alps and Prealps - Luberon Mountains |
| 23 | Mont Pourri | 3,779 | 12,398 | 1,127 | 3,698 | 45°31′41″N 06°51′37″E | Alps | Graian Alps - Vanoise Massif |
| 24 | Mont Colombier | 2,045 | 6,709 | 1,095 | 3,593 | 45°38′39″N 06°07′11″E | Alps | Savoy Prealps - Bauges Massif |
| 25 | Pic du Midi d'Ossau | 2,886 | 9,469 | 1,092 | 3,583 | 42°48′22″N 00°25′05″W | Pyrenees | |
| 26 | Roc d'Enfer | 2,244 | 7,362 | 1,081 | 3,547 | 46°11′23″N 06°36′43″E | Alps | Savoy Prealps - Chablais Alps |
| 27 | Grand Ballon | 1,424 | 4,672 | 1,072 | 3,517 | 47°54′04″N 07°05′53″E | Vosges | |
| 28 | Aiguille de Scolette | 3,506 | 11,503 | 1,069 | 3,507 | 45°09′36″N 06°46′07″E | Alps | Cottian Alps |
| 29 | Mont Lachat | 2,023 | 6,637 | 1,064 | 3,491 | 45°55′38″N 06°21′04″E | Alps | Savoy Prealps - Chablais Alps |
| 30 | Grand Pic de Belledonne | 2,978 | 9,770 | 1,054 | 3,458 | 45°10′09″N 05°59′22″E | Alps | Dauphiné Alps |
| 31 | Montagne de Céüse | 2,016 | 6,614 | 1,040 | 3,410 | 44°30′32″N 05°57′43″E | Alps | |
| 32 | Le Roignais | 2,995 | 9,826 | 1,028 | 3,373 | 45°38′35″N 06°41′20″E | Alps | |
| 33 | Vignemale | 3,298 | 10,820 | 1,025 | 3,363 | 42°42′16″N 00°03′50″W | Pyrenees | |
| 34 | Le Tabor | 2,389 | 7,838 | 1,022 | 3,353 | 44°58′39″N 05°51′21″E | Alps | Dauphiné Alps |
| 35 | Pic de Rochebrune | 3,320 | 10,890 | 1,019 | 3,343 | 44°49′21″N 06°47′16″E | Alps | Cottian Alps |
| 36 | Pic de Soularac | 2,368 | 7,769 | 1,007 | 3,304 | 42°49′04″N 01°46′54″E | Pyrenees | |
| 37 | Puig Carlit | 2,921 | 9,583 | 1,001 | 3,284 | 42°33′39″N 01°48′37″E | Pyrenees | |
