= Dauphiné Prealps =

Mountain range in the Alps

- Préalpes du Dauphiné
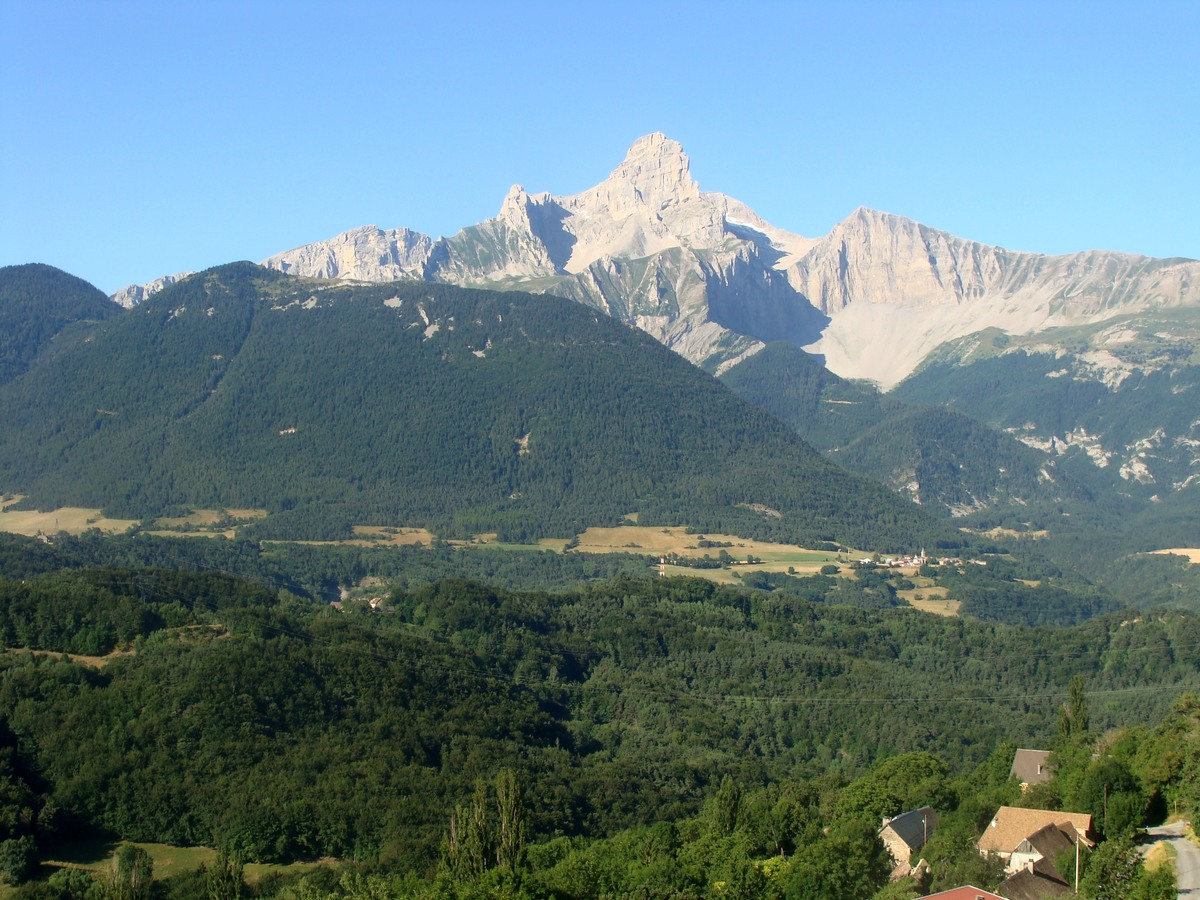
- Grande Tête de l'Obiou

Highest point
- Peak: Grande Tête de l'Obiou
- Elevation: 2,790 m (9,150 ft)
- Coordinates: 44°46′31″N 5°50′22″E

Geography
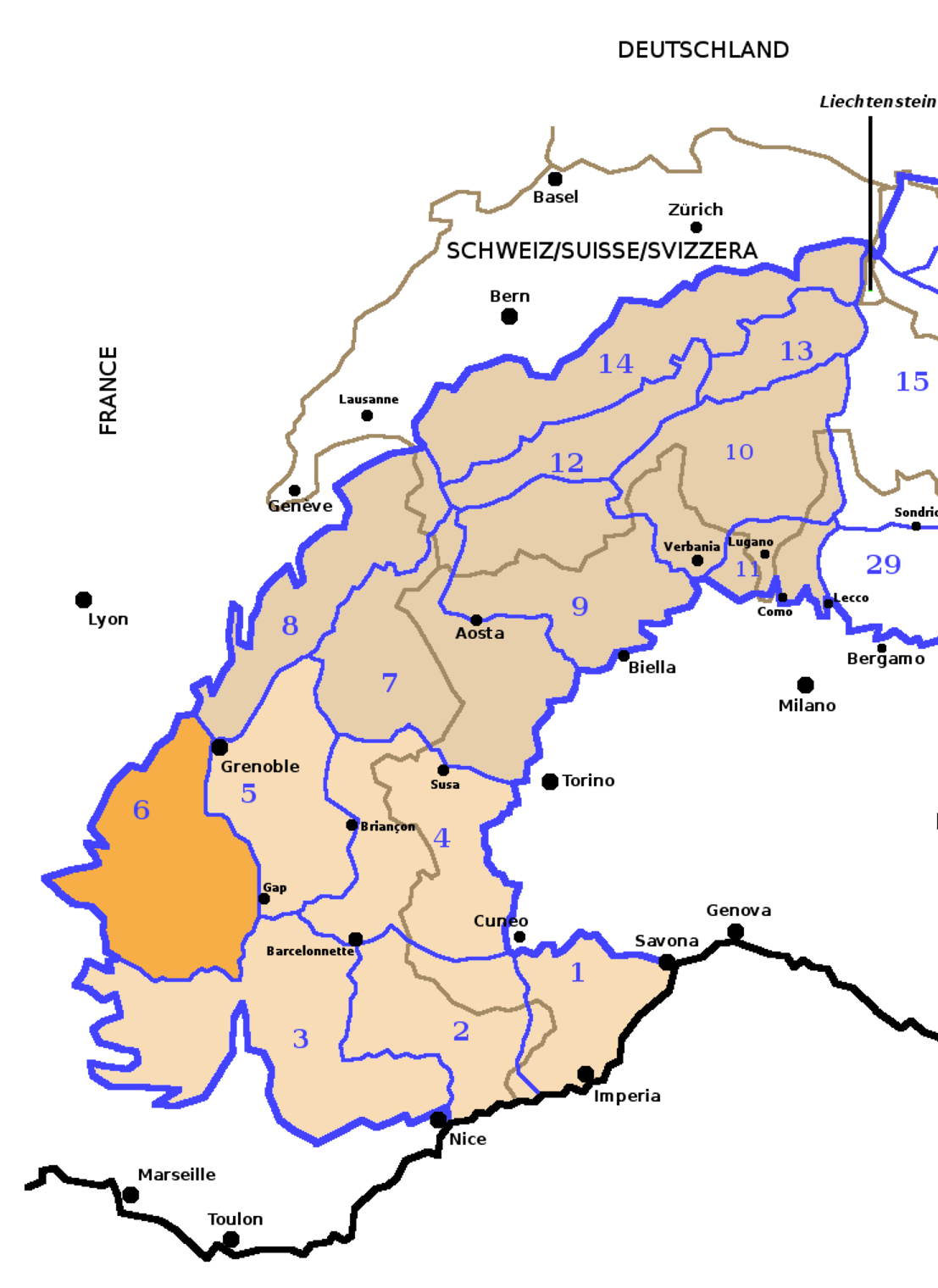
- Dauphiné Prealps (section nr.6) within Western Alps
- Country: France
- Région: Rhône-Alpes, Provence-Alpes-Côte d'Azur
- Rivers: Drac, Durance, Isère and Drôme
- Parent range: Alps
- Borders on: Provence Alps and Prealps, Dauphiné Alps and Savoy Prealps

Geology
- Orogeny: Alpine orogeny
- Rock type: Sedimentary rocks

The Dauphiné Prealps (French: Préalpes du Dauphiné) are a mountain range in the south-western part of the Alps. They are located in Rhône-Alpes and, marginally, in Provence-Alpes-Côte d'Azur (south-eastern France). Dauphiné Prealps are the central section of the French Prealps.

== Etymology ==
The Dauphiné (pronounced [dofine]) is a historical region whose area roughly corresponded to that of the present departments of Isère, Drôme, and Hautes-Alpes.

== Geography ==
Administratively the French part of the range belongs to the French departments of Isère, Drôme, Hautes-Alpes and, marginally, Alpes-de-Haute-Provence. The whole range is drained by the Rhône river.

=== SOIUSA classification ===
According to SOIUSA (International Standardized Mountain Subdivision of the Alps) the mountain range is an Alpine section, classified in the following way:

- Main part = Western Alps
- Major sector = South Western Alps
- Section = Dauphiné Prealps
- Code = I/A-6

=== Borders ===
Dauphiné Prealps' borders are (anticlockwise):

- Isère (north);
- Drac, Col Bayard - which connects them with Dauphiné Alps - and Durance (east)
- Buëch, Col de Macuègne - which connects them with Provence Alps and prealps - and Toulourenc river (south);
- Rhone and Isère valleys (west).

=== Subdivision ===
The Dauphiné Prealps are divided into five Alpine subsections:

- Dévoluy Mountains - SOIUSA code:I/A-6.I;
- Massif Céüse-Aujour - SOIUSA code:I/A-6.II;
- Massif du Vercors - SOIUSA code:I/A-6.III;
- Massif du Diois - SOIUSA code:I/A-6.IV;
- Massif des Baronnies - SOIUSA code:I/A-6.V.

== Notable summits ==
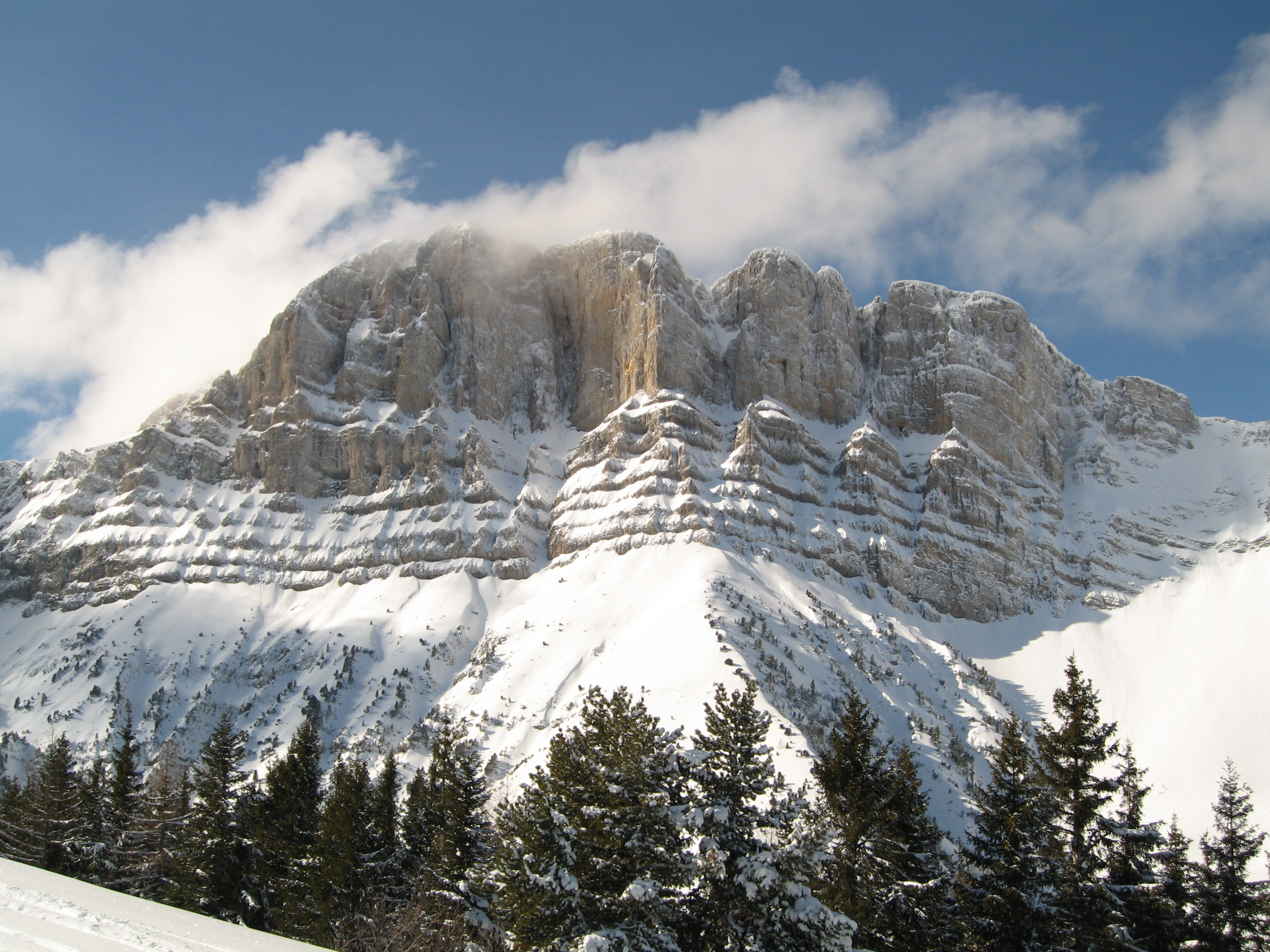
The Grand Veymont in winter

Some notable summits of the range are:

Name	metres	feet
Grande Tête de l'Obiou	2,790	9,148
Grand Ferrand	2,759	9,049
Pic de Bure	2,709	8,885
Jocou	2,501	8,203
Grand Veymont	2,346	7,694

== Notable passes ==
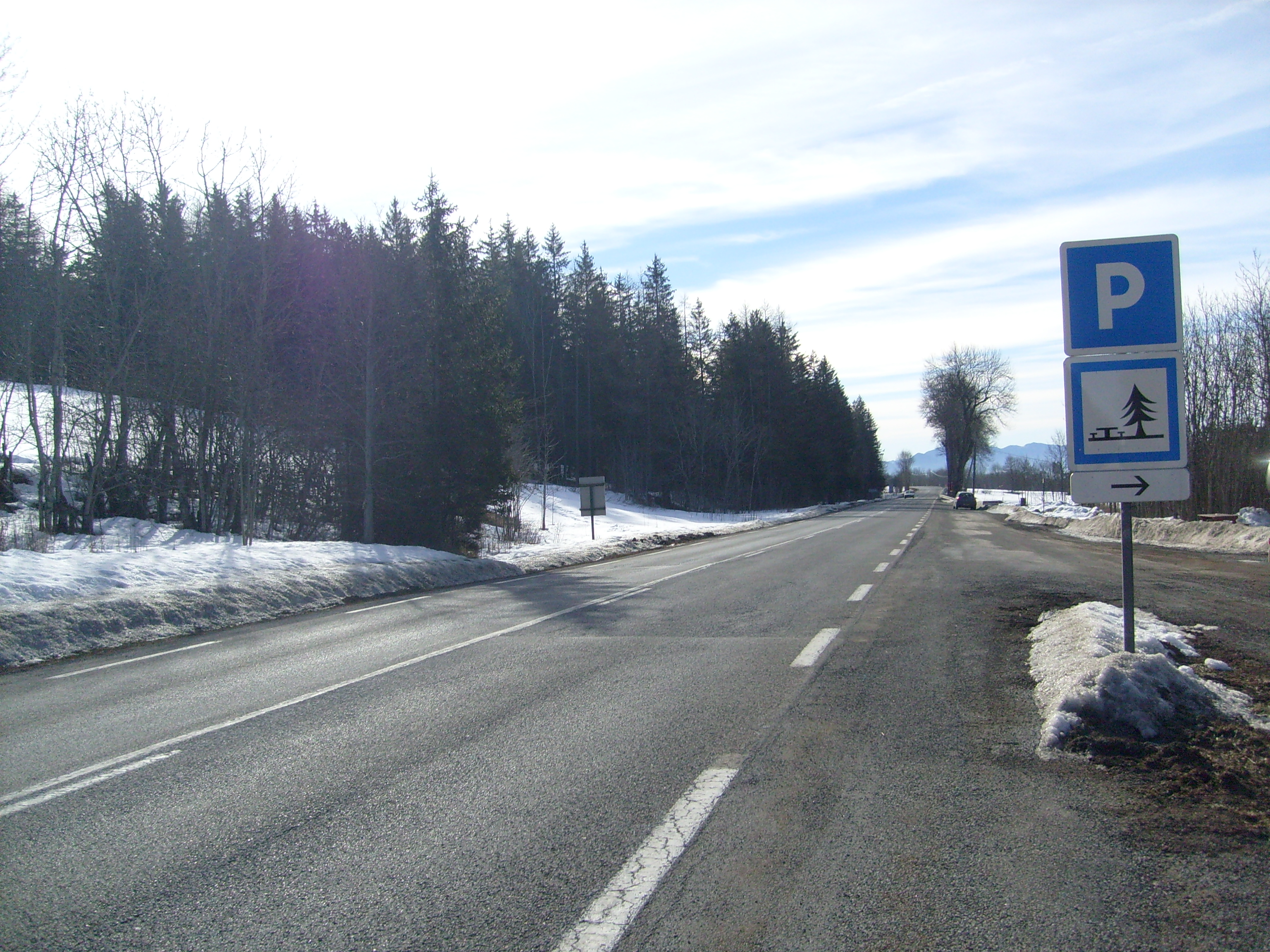
Col Bayard, 1,248 m

Some notable passes of the range are:

Name	location	type	elevation (m)	elevation (ft)
Col de la Croix Haute	Clelles to Lus-la-Croix-Haute	road	1,179	3,867
Col Bayard	Gap to Grenoble	road	1,248	4,093
Col du Noyer	Le Noyer to Saint-Étienne-en-Dévoluy	road	1,664	5,458

== Maps ==
- French official cartography (Institut Géographique National - IGN); on-line version: www.geoportail.fr
