= Dévoluy Mountains =

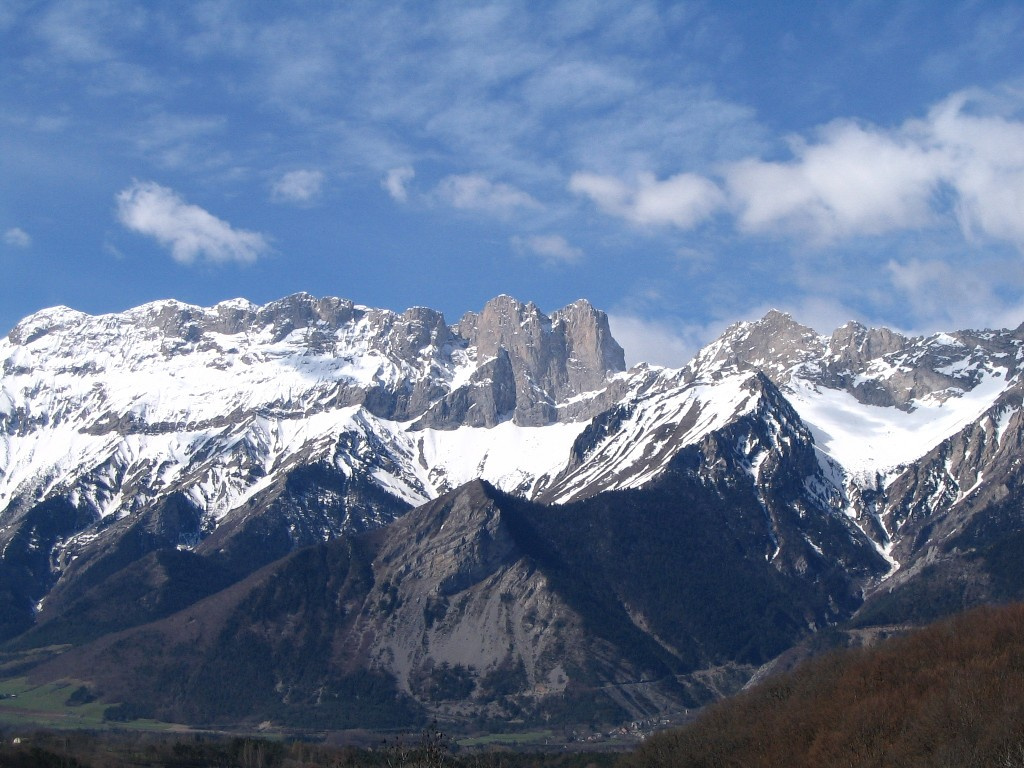

Highest point
- Peak: Grande Tête de l'Obiou
- Elevation: 2,789 m (9,150 ft)
- Coordinates: 44°46′31″N 05°50′22″E

Geography
- Location within Alps
- Country: France
- Region: Hautes-Alpes
- Parent range: Dauphiné Prealps

The Dévoluy Mountains (French: massif du Dévoluy, pronounced [masif dy devɔlɥi]) is a limestone massif located in Hautes-Alpes, France. It is part of the Dauphiné Prealps and is bordered by the Drac River to the north and the Buëch River to the south and west and is a popular destination for hiking, mountaineering and skiing. Its most notable peaks are the Grande Tête de l'Obiou (2,789 m) and Pic de Bure at 2,709 m.
