= 1950 Tête de l'Obiou C-54 crash =

Aviation accident in France

Tete de I'Obiou accident
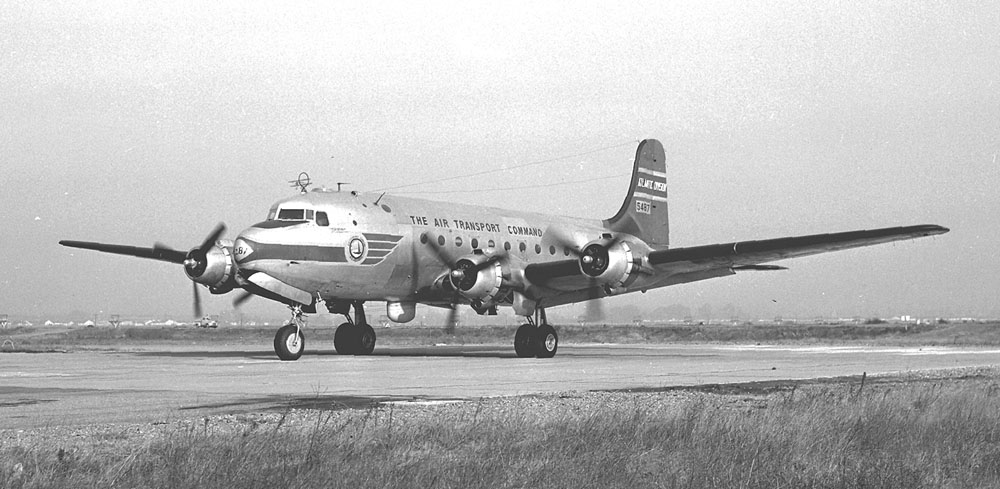
- A Douglas C-54 similar to the accident aircraft

Accident
- Date: 13 November 1950
- Summary: CFIT
- Site: Near Grenoble, France; 44°46′31″N 05°50′22″E

Aircraft
- Aircraft type: Douglas C-54B-1-DC
- Operator: Curtiss-Reid Flying Service
- Registration: CF-EDN
- Flight origin: Rome-Ciampino Airport
- Destination: Paris-Orly Airport
- Passengers: 51
- Crew: 7
- Fatalities: 58
- Survivors: 0

The Tête de l'Obiou accident was on 13 November 1950. Curtiss-Reid Flying Service had been operating a scheduled service between Paris and Rome since 1945. On 13 November 1950, a Paris-bound Douglas C-54B-1-DC aircraft crashed on the Grande Tête de l'Obiou mountain, 48 km (30 mi) south of Grenoble. All 51 passengers and 7 crew were killed. The aircraft was 50 miles (80 km) off course.

Flight attendant Helen Johnston's body was missing for weeks until it was found in a crevasse on the mountain.

== Accident narrative ==
The aircraft was carrying fifty-one pilgrims, all but two of whom were Canadians and fifteen of whom were Catholic priests, on the return leg to Montreal Dorval Airport from a Holy Year pilgrimage in Rome.

After departing Rome Ciampino at 14:16, it crossed the Mediterranean via Bastia in Corsica, whence the flight plan called for it to pass over the Istres non-directional beacon. Whereas the crew reported its position at Istres at 16:26, the aircraft was already some 40 nautical miles to the east.

A second position report, at 16:44, put it over Montelimar, whereas it was in reality in the vicinity of the airport at Gap-Tallard. Some fifteen minutes later, the aircraft struck the top of the 9,150-feet high Tête de l'Obiou mountain, less than six feet from the summit. Night was falling and the mountain was enveloped by cloud at the time of the accident. All on board were killed instantly.

Alpine rescuers soon reached the scene notwithstanding severe conditions, one being killed by an avalanche during the ascent. However, the ruggedness of the terrain and the high impact forces greatly impeded the recovery operation. Fifteen of the dead were never identified. In July 1951, six Italian forest workers were prosecuted for looting the crash site and stealing money, jewellery and religious objects from the wreckage.

The accident happened only 10 days after the crash of Air India Flight 245, another CFIT accident in the French Alps, which had claimed 48 lives.

== See also ==
- Grande Tête de l'Obiou
