= 2013 Tour de France Mountains classification =

The 2013 Tour de France King of the Mountains is Nairo Quintana. He won the mountains classification of the 2013 Tour de France which is in place to decide the best climber of the tour. The race featured 5 Hors catégorie climbs, 6 Category-one climbs, 12 Category-two climbs, 16 Category-three climbs, and 17 Category-four climbs. That means the 2013 Tour de France included 28 mountain climbs or altitude finishes ranked Category-two, Category-one or Hors catégorie compared to 25 in 2012, 23 in 2011 and 25 in 2010. 4 of these climbs are in Corsica, 2 in the Massif Central, 7 in the Pyrenees and 15 in the Alps. Notable climbs in this year's tour include Col de Pailheres, Col de la Madeleine, Annecy-Semnoz, Mont Ventoux and Alpe d'Huez (twice).

== Point distribution ==
| Category | 1st | 2nd | 3rd | 4th | 5th | 6th | 7th | 8th | 9th | 10th |
|---|---|---|---|---|---|---|---|---|---|---|
| Hors catégorie | 25 | 20 | 16 | 14 | 12 | 10 | 8 | 6 | 4 | 2 |
| Category 1 | 10 | 8 | 6 | 4 | 2 | 1 | | | | |
| Category 2 | 5 | 3 | 2 | 1 | | | | | | |
| Category 3 | 2 | 1 | | | | | | | | |
| Category 4 | 1 | | | | | | | | | |

Points awarded are doubled for the final climbs on stages 8, 15, 18 and 20.

== Overall classification ==
Final Mountains Classification top 20 riders with points by stage:

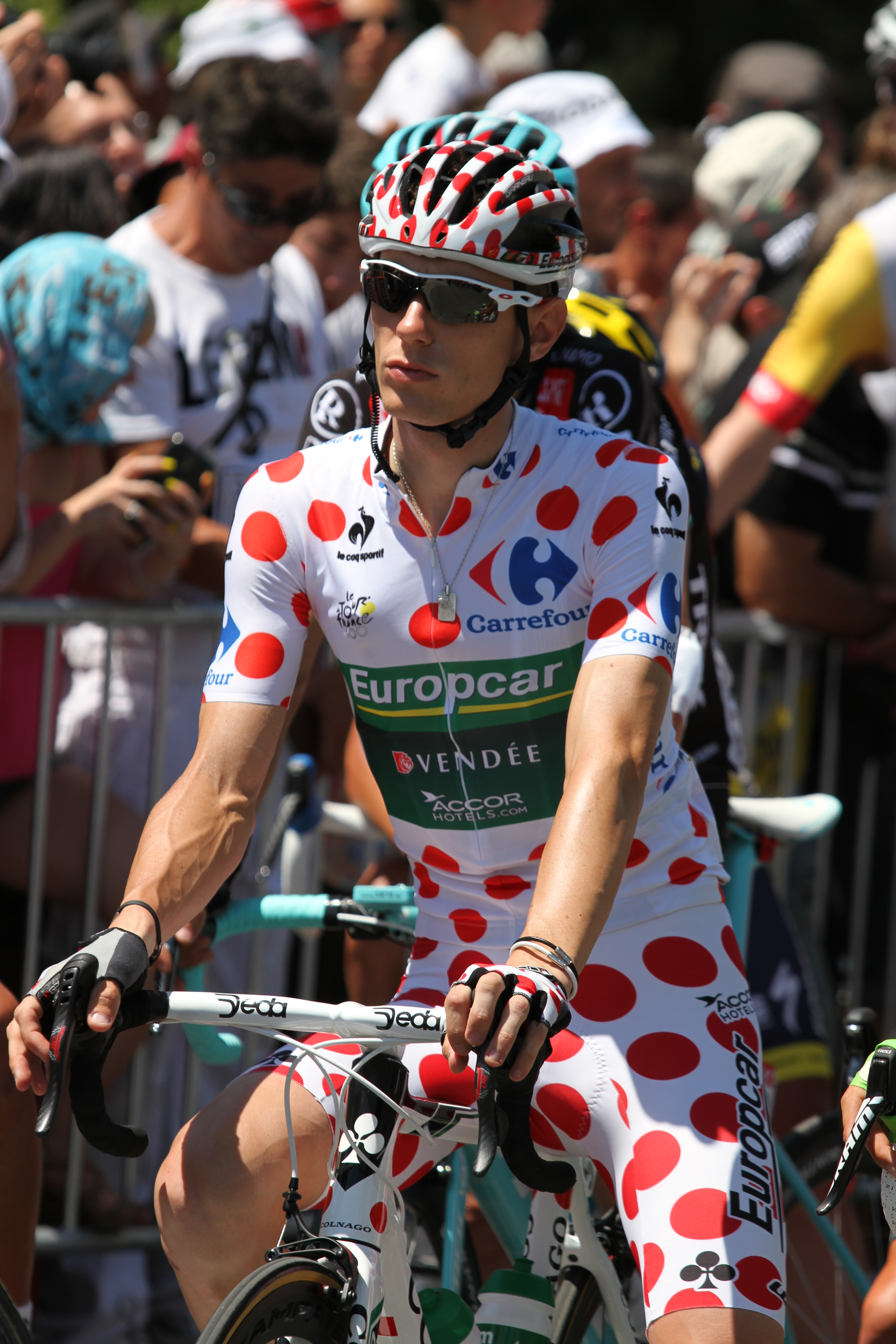
Pierre Rolland in the polka-dot jersey before stage 6

| Pos. | Rider | No. | Team | Stage | | | | | | | | | | | | | | | | | | | | | Points |
| Pos. | Rider | No. | Team | 1 | 2 | 3 | 4 | 5 | 6 | 7 | 8 | 9 | 10 | 11 | 12 | 13 | 14 | 15 | 16 | 17 | 18 | 19 | 20 | 21 | Points |
|---|---|---|---|---|---|---|---|---|---|---|---|---|---|---|---|---|---|---|---|---|---|---|---|---|---|
| 1 | Nairo Quintana (COL) | 128 | Movistar Team | | | | | | | | 25 | 1 | | | | | | 40 | | 3 | 28 | | 50 | | 147 |
| 2 | Chris Froome (GBR) | 1 | Team Sky | | 1 | | | | | | 30 | 2 | | | | | | 50 | | 5 | 16 | | 32 | | 136 |
| 3 | Pierre Rolland (FRA) | 51 | Team Europcar | | 5 | 5 | | | | 1 | 20 | 18 | | | | 1 | | 1 | | | | 52 | 16 | | 119 |
| 4 | Joaquim Rodríguez (ESP) | 101 | Team Katusha | | | | | | | | | | | | | | | 28 | | 7 | 24 | | 40 | | 99 |
| 5 | Christophe Riblon (FRA) | 89 | Ag2r–La Mondiale | | | | | | | | | | | | | | | 1 | 2 | | 74 | 16 | 5 | | 98 |
| 6 | Mikel Nieve (ESP) | 116 | Euskaltel–Euskadi | | | 3 | | | | | 18 | | | | | | | 32 | | | 10 | 35 | | | 98 |
| 7 | Moreno Moser (ITA) | 17 | Cannondale | | | | | | | | | | | | | | | | | | 58 | 14 | | | 72 |
| 8 | Richie Porte (AUS) | 6 | Team Sky | | | | | | | | 28 | | | | | | | | | | 20 | | 24 | | 72 |
| 9 | Ryder Hesjedal (CAN) | 171 | Garmin–Sharp | | | | | | | | | 12 | | | | | | | 2 | | 5 | 45 | | | 64 |
| 10 | Tejay van Garderen (USA) | 39 | BMC Racing Team | | | | | | | | | | | | | | 1 | | | | 61 | | 1 | | 63 |
| 11 | Alejandro Valverde (ESP) | 121 | Movistar Team | | | | | | | | 20 | | | | | | | | | 2 | 12 | | 28 | | 62 |
| 12 | Alberto Contador (ESP) | 91 | Saxo–Tinkoff | | | | | | | | | | | | | | | 20 | | 5 | | | 16 | | 41 |
| 13 | Jens Voigt (GER) | 48 | RadioShack–Leopard | | | | | | | 4 | | | | | | | 1 | | | | 18 | | 12 | | 35 |
| 14 | Jan Bakelants (BEL) | 42 | RadioShack–Leopard | | | | | | | 3 | | 3 | | | | | 1 | | | | | 26 | | | 33 |
| 15 | Roman Kreuziger (CZE) | 94 | Saxo–Tinkoff | | | | | | | | | 4 | | | | | | 24 | | | | | 4 | | 32 |
| 16 | Rui Costa (POR) | 124 | Movistar Team | | | | | | | | 6 | | | | | | | | 5 | | | 20 | | | 31 |
| 17 | Jakob Fuglsang (DEN) | 63 | Astana | | | | | | | | | 8 | | | | | | 16 | | | 4 | | | | 28 |
| 18 | Tom Danielson (USA) | 173 | Garmin–Sharp | | | | | | | | | 12 | | | | | | | | | 15 | | | | 27 |
| 19 | Arnold Jeannesson (FRA) | 77 | FDJ.fr | | | | | | | | | 6 | | | | | | | | | 18 | | | | 24 |
| 20 | Blel Kadri (FRA) | 87 | Ag2r–La Mondiale | | 5 | | | | | 7 | | | | | | | 4 | | | | | 8 | | | 24 |

Final Mountains Classification top 6 riders with points by category:

| Pos. | Rider | No. | Team | Category | | | | | | | Points |
| Pos. | Rider | No. | Team | HC* | HC | 1* | 1 | 2 | 3 | 4 | Points |
|---|---|---|---|---|---|---|---|---|---|---|---|
| 1 | Nairo Quintana (COL) | 128 | Movistar Team | 118 | 25 | | 1 | 3 | | | 147 |
| 2 | Chris Froome (GBR) | 1 | Team Sky | 98 | 10 | 20 | 2 | 5 | 1 | | 136 |
| 3 | Pierre Rolland (FRA) | 51 | Team Europcar | | 57 | | 34 | 21 | 5 | 2 | 119 |
| 4 | Joaquim Rodríguez (ESP) | 101 | Team Katusha | 92 | | | | 7 | | | 99 |
| 5 | Christophe Riblon (FRA) | 89 | Ag2r–La Mondiale | 50 | 36 | | 4 | 5 | 2 | | 98 |
| 6 | Mikel Nieve (ESP) | 116 | Euskaltel–Euskadi | 40 | 44 | 2 | 9 | 3 | | | 98 |

* denotes climbs were also stage finishes and therefore points awarded were doubled.

== Top 6 riders' results on the HC and 1st category climbs ==
The following table shows the mountains classification's top six riders' results on the 15 most difficult climbs of the 2013 Tour de France.

| Pos. | Rider | Climb | | | | | | | | | | | | | | |
| Pos. | Rider | HC* | | | HC | | | | 1st* | 1st | | | | | | |
| Pos. | Rider | Mont Ventoux | Alpe d'Huez 2 | Annecy-Semnoz | Col de Pailheres | Alpe d'Huez 1 | Col du Glandon | Col de la Madeleine | Ax 3 Domaines | Col de Menté | Col de Peyresourde | Col de Val Louron-Azet | La Hourquette d'Ancizan | Col de l'Épine | Col de la Croix Fry | Mont Revard |
|---|---|---|---|---|---|---|---|---|---|---|---|---|---|---|---|---|
| 1 | Nairo Quintana (COL) | 2nd | 4th | 1st | 1st | | | | | 6th | | | | | | |
| 2 | Chris Froome (GBR) | 1st | 7th | 3rd | 6th | | | | 1st | | | | 5th | | | |
| 3 | Pierre Rolland (FRA) | | | | 2nd | | 5th | 1st | | 5th | 2nd | 2nd | | 1st | | 3rd |
| 4 | Joaquim Rodríguez (ESP) | 4th | 5th | 2nd | | | | | | | | | | | | |
| 5 | Christophe Riblon (FRA) | | 1st | | | 2nd | 3rd | | | | | | | | | 4th |
| 6 | Mikel Nieve (ESP) | 3rd | 9th | | 3rd | 10th | 6th | 3rd | 6th | | | | | 2nd | 6th | |

* denotes climbs were also stage finishes and therefore points awarded were doubled.

== How the polka-dot jersey was won ==
Pierre Rolland scored points on more climbs than any other rider; on a total of 18 climbs, compared to the King of the Mountains Nairo Quintana, who scored points on only 6 climbs. However, the climbs that Quintana scored points on included all three of the Hors Category climbs that were at stage finishes – the climbs that offered the most points. Of the climbs the riders placed in the points for, Quintana averaged 24.5 points per climb, compared to Rolland who averaged just 6.6 points. In total, Quintana won 97% of his points on Hors Category climbs, Chris Froome 79%, Rodriguez 92%, Riblon 88% and Nieve 86%, compared to Rolland who only won 48% of his points on HC climbs.

== Stage by stage ==
=== Stage 1 ===
In the first stage, only one climb was categorized: the Cote de Sotta, of fourth category. The details and result of the climb on this stage are as follows:

Cote de Sotta – 45.5 km (Category 4)

This climb is 1.1 km at an average gradient of 5.9%.

| | Rider | Team | Points |
|---|---|---|---|
| 1 | Juan José Lobato (ESP) | Euskaltel–Euskadi | 1 |

Juan José Lobato was awarded the polka dot jersey after the stage.

=== Stage 2 ===
Juan José Lobato started the stage wearing the polka dot jersey. The details and results of the climbs on this stage are as follows:

Col de Bellagranajo – 70 km (Category 3)

This climb is 6.6 km at an average gradient of 4.6%.

| | Rider | Team | Points |
|---|---|---|---|
| 1 | Lars Boom (NED) | Belkin Pro Cycling | 2 |
| 2 | Rubén Pérez (ESP) | Euskaltel–Euskadi | 1 |

Cote de la Serra – 85.0 km (Category 3)

This climb is 5.2 km at an average gradient of 6.9%.

| | Rider | Team | Points |
|---|---|---|---|
| 1 | Blel Kadri (FRA) | Ag2r–La Mondiale | 2 |
| 2 | David Veilleux (CAN) | Team Europcar | 1 |

Col de Vizzavona (1,163 m) – 95.5 km (Category 2)

This climb is 4.6 km at an average gradient of 6.5%.

| | Rider | Team | Points |
|---|---|---|---|
| 1 | Pierre Rolland (FRA) | Team Europcar | 5 |
| 2 | Blel Kadri (FRA) | Ag2r–La Mondiale | 3 |
| 3 | Brice Feillu (FRA) | Sojasun | 2 |
| 4 | Vasil Kiryienka (BLR) | Team Sky | 1 |

Cote du Salario – 144.0 km (Category 3)

This climb is 1.9 km at an average gradient of 8.9%.

| | Rider | Team | Points |
|---|---|---|---|
| 1 | Cyril Gautier (FRA) | Team Europcar | 2 |
| 2 | Chris Froome (GBR) | Team Sky | 1 |

Blel Kadri and Pierre Rolland finished the stage tied on 5 points in the mountain classification. But, the polka dot jersey was awarded to Pierre Rolland because he had the most first-place finishes on the hardest climbs. Blel Kadri won the combativity award for the stage.

=== Stage 3 ===
Stage 3 started with Pierre Rolland in the polka dot jersey. The details and results of the climbs on this stage are as follows:

Col de san Bastino – 12.0 km (Category 4)

This climb is 3.4 km at an average gradient of 4.6%.

| | Rider | Team | Points |
|---|---|---|---|
| 1 | Simon Clarke (AUS) | Orica–GreenEDGE | 1 |

Cote de san Martino – 58.0 km (Category 3)

This climb is 7.5 km at an average gradient of 5.4%.

| | Rider | Team | Points |
|---|---|---|---|
| 1 | Simon Clarke (AUS) | Orica–GreenEDGE | 2 |
| 2 | Alexis Vuillermoz (FRA) | Sojasun | 1 |

Cote de Porto – 75.0 km (Category 3)

This climb is 2 km at an average gradient of 6.4%.

| | Rider | Team | Points |
|---|---|---|---|
| 1 | Simon Clarke (AUS) | Orica–GreenEDGE | 2 |
| 2 | Alexis Vuillermoz (FRA) | Sojasun | 1 |

Col de Marsolino (443 m) – 132.0 km (Category 2)

This climb is 3.3 km at an average gradient of 8.1%.

| | Rider | Team | Points |
|---|---|---|---|
| 1 | Pierre Rolland (FRA) | Team Europcar | 5 |
| 2 | Mikel Nieve (ESP) | Euskaltel–Euskadi | 3 |
| 3 | Lars Petter Nordhaug (NOR) | Belkin Pro Cycling | 2 |
| 4 | Jurgen Van den Broeck (BEL) | Lotto–Belisol | 1 |

Pierre Rolland increased his overall lead in the King of the Mountains classification. Simon Clarke won the combativity award for the stage.

=== Stage 4 ===
Team time trial – no climbs.

=== Stage 5 ===
The details and results of the climbs on this stage are as follows:

Cote de Chateauneuf-Grasse – 22 km (Category 3)

This climb is 1.4 km at an average gradient of 8.4%.

| | Rider | Team | Points |
|---|---|---|---|
| 1 | Thomas De Gendt (BEL) | Vacansoleil–DCM | 2 |
| 2 | Anthony Delaplace (FRA) | Sojasun | 1 |

Col de l'Ange – 93 km (Category 4)

This climb is 1.66 km at an average gradient of 4.1%.

| | Rider | Team | Points |
|---|---|---|---|
| 1 | Thomas De Gendt (BEL) | Vacansoleil–DCM | 1 |

Cote de la Roquebrussanne – 154 km (Category 4)

This climb is 3.5 km at an average gradient of 4.2%.

| | Rider | Team | Points |
|---|---|---|---|
| 1 | Yukiya Arashiro (JPN) | Team Europcar | 1 |

Cote des Bastides – 198 km (Category 4)

This climb is 5.7 km at an average gradient of 3.1%.

| | Rider | Team | Points |
|---|---|---|---|
| 1 | Thomas De Gendt (BEL) | Vacansoleil–DCM | 1 |

In addition to winning 4 points and moving up to 4th place in the mountains classification, Thomas De Gendt won the combativity award for the stage. Pierre Rolland maintained a 5-point lead in the mountains classification and kept the polka dot jersey.

=== Stage 6 ===
The details and results of the climbs on this stage are as follows:

Col de la Vayede – 68 km (Category 4)

This climb is 0.7 km at an average gradient of 7%.

| | Rider | Team | Points |
|---|---|---|---|
| 1 | Kanstantsin Sivtsov (BLR) | Team Sky | 1 |

This was Kanstantsin Sivtsov's first point in the mountains classification, so the top of the leader-board stayed the same with Pierre Rolland retaining the polka dot jersey.

=== Stage 7 ===
The details and results of the climbs on this stage are as follows:

Col des Treize Vents (600 m) – 80 km (Category 3)

This climb is 6.9 km at an average gradient of 5.6%.

| | Rider | Team | Points |
|---|---|---|---|
| 1 | Blel Kadri (FRA) | Ag2r–La Mondiale | 2 |
| 2 | Jens Voigt (GER) | RadioShack–Leopard | 1 |

Col de la Croix de Mounis (809 m) – 94.5 km (Category 2)

This climb is 6.7 km at an average gradient of 6.5%.

| | Rider | Team | Points |
|---|---|---|---|
| 1 | Blel Kadri (FRA) | Ag2r–La Mondiale | 5 |
| 2 | Jens Voigt (GER) | RadioShack–Leopard | 3 |
| 3 | Romain Bardet (FRA) | Ag2r–La Mondiale | 2 |
| 4 | Pierre Rolland (FRA) | Team Europcar | 1 |

Cote de la Quintaine (809 m) – 149 km (Category 3)

This climb is 6.5 km at an average gradient of 4%.

| | Rider | Team | Points |
|---|---|---|---|
| 1 | Jan Bakelants (BEL) | RadioShack–Leopard | 2 |
| 2 | Cyril Gautier (FRA) | Team Europcar | 1 |

Cote de Teillet – 171 km (Category 4)

This climb is 2.6 km at an average gradient of 5%.

| | Rider | Team | Points |
|---|---|---|---|
| 1 | Jan Bakelants (BEL) | RadioShack–Leopard | 1 |

Finishing first in the first and second climbs of the stage meant Blel Kadri became the new leader in the mountains category, just one point ahead of previous leader Pierre Rolland.

=== Stage 8 – Col de Pailheres ===
Stage 8 is the first "very difficult stage" of the 2013 Tour de France. The details and results of the climbs on this stage are as follows:

Cote de Saint-Ferreol (374 m) – 26.5 km (Category 4)

This climb is 2.2 km at an average gradient of 5.4%.

| | Rider | Team | Points |
|---|---|---|---|
| 1 | Rudy Molard (FRA) | Cofidis | 1 |

Col de Pailheres (2001 m) – 166 km (Hors catégorie)

This climb is 15.3 km at an average gradient of 8% with long sections at 9–10%. The summit is the highest point on the entire route of this year's Tour. The leader over the summit won the Souvenir Henri Desgrange.

| | Rider | Team | Points |
|---|---|---|---|
| 1 | Nairo Quintana (COL) | Movistar Team | 25 |
| 2 | Pierre Rolland (FRA) | Team Europcar | 20 |
| 3 | Mikel Nieve (ESP) | Euskaltel–Euskadi | 16 |
| 4 | Peter Kennaugh (GBR) | Team Sky | 14 |
| 5 | Richie Porte (AUS) | Team Sky | 12 |
| 6 | Chris Froome (GBR) | Team Sky | 10 |
| 7 | Alejandro Valverde (ESP) | Movistar Team | 8 |
| 8 | Rui Costa (POR) | Movistar Team | 6 |
| 9 | Michael Rogers (AUS) | Saxo–Tinkoff | 4 |
| 10 | Laurens ten Dam (NED) | Belkin Pro Cycling | 2 |

Ax 3 Domaines (1350 m) – 193.5 km (Category 1)

This climb is 7.8 km at an average gradient of 8.2%. Points awarded are doubled on this climb.

| | Rider | Team | Points |
|---|---|---|---|
| 1 | Chris Froome (GBR) | Team Sky | 20 |
| 2 | Richie Porte (AUS) | Team Sky | 16 |
| 3 | Alejandro Valverde (ESP) | Movistar Team | 12 |
| 4 | Bauke Mollema (NED) | Belkin Pro Cycling | 8 |
| 5 | Laurens ten Dam (NED) | Belkin Pro Cycling | 4 |
| 6 | Mikel Nieve (ESP) | Euskaltel–Euskadi | 2 |

The polka dot jersey of Blel Kadri was dropped by the peloton early on the climb to the Col de Pailheres. Nairo Quintana attacked the peloton to chase down and pass breakaway rider Christophe Riblon and win the first Hors catégorie climb of the 2013 Tour de France, with Pierre Rolland finishing less than a minute behind him in an attempt to reclaim the polka dot jersey. Nairo Quintana also won the combativity award for the stage. The final climb saw Chris Froome make his first push for the general classification. He was first to the summit of the climb, followed by teammate Richie Porte.

=== Stage 9 ===
While Chris Froome led the mountains classification going into this stage, the polka dot jersey was worn by Pierre Rolland because Chris Froome also had the yellow jersey. The details and results of the climbs on this stage are as follows:

Col de Portet d'Aspet (1069 m) – 28.5 km (Category 2)

This climb is 5.4 km at an average gradient of 7%.

| | Rider | Team | Points |
|---|---|---|---|
| 1 | Arnold Jeannesson (FRA) | FDJ.fr | 5 |
| 2 | Dan Martin (IRE) | Garmin–Sharp | 3 |
| 3 | Tom Danielson (USA) | Garmin–Sharp | 2 |
| 4 | Przemysław Niemiec (POL) | Lampre–Merida | 1 |

Col de Menté (1349 m) – 44 km (Category 1)

This climb is 7 km at an average gradient of 8.1%.

| | Rider | Team | Points |
|---|---|---|---|
| 1 | Tom Danielson (USA) | Garmin–Sharp | 10 |
| 2 | Ryder Hesjedal (CAN) | Garmin–Sharp | 8 |
| 3 | Yury Trofimov (RUS) | Team Katusha | 6 |
| 4 | Igor Anton (ESP) | Euskaltel–Euskadi | 4 |
| 5 | Pierre Rolland (FRA) | Team Europcar | 2 |
| 6 | Nairo Quintana (COL) | Movistar Team | 1 |

Col de Peyresourde (1569 m) – 87 km (Category 1)

This climb is 13.1 km at an average gradient of 7.1%.

| | Rider | Team | Points |
|---|---|---|---|
| 1 | Thomas De Gendt (BEL) | Vacansoleil–DCM | 10 |
| 2 | Pierre Rolland (FRA) | Team Europcar | 8 |
| 3 | Bart De Clercq (BEL) | Lotto–Belisol | 6 |
| 4 | Ryder Hesjedal (CAN) | Garmin–Sharp | 4 |
| 5 | Romain Bardet (FRA) | Ag2r–La Mondiale | 2 |
| 6 | Jan Bakelants (BEL) | RadioShack–Leopard | 1 |

Col de Val Louron-Azet (1580 m) – 107.5 km (Category 1)

This climb is 7.4 km at an average gradient of 8.3%.

| | Rider | Team | Points |
|---|---|---|---|
| 1 | Simon Clarke (AUS) | Orica–GreenEDGE | 10 |
| 2 | Pierre Rolland (FRA) | Team Europcar | 8 |
| 3 | Romain Bardet (FRA) | Ag2r–La Mondiale | 6 |
| 4 | Bart De Clercq (BEL) | Lotto–Belisol | 4 |
| 5 | Jan Bakelants (BEL) | RadioShack–Leopard | 2 |
| 6 | Jonathan Castroviejo (ESP) | Movistar Team | 1 |

La Hourquette d'Ancizan (1564 m) – 135 km (Category 1)

This climb is 9.9 km at an average gradient of 7.5%.

| | Rider | Team | Points |
|---|---|---|---|
| 1 | Dan Martin (IRE) | Garmin–Sharp | 10 |
| 2 | Jakob Fuglsang (DEN) | Astana | 8 |
| 3 | Wouter Poels (NED) | Vacansoleil–DCM | 6 |
| 4 | Roman Kreuziger (CZE) | Saxo–Tinkoff | 4 |
| 5 | Chris Froome (GBR) | Team Sky | 2 |
| 6 | Andy Schleck (LUX) | RadioShack–Leopard | 1 |

With Richard Virenque and Laurent Jalabert for inspiration, Pierre Rolland won 18 points on an "epic" stage 9 to top the mountains classification outright. Dan Martin picked up 13 points on the stage, including a maximum 10 points on the final climb en route to his stage victory.

=== Stage 10 ===
The details and results of the climb on this stage are as follows:

Cote de Dinan – 142 km (Category 4)

This climb is 1 km at an average gradient of 4.2%.

| | Rider | Team | Points |
|---|---|---|---|
| 1 | Lieuwe Westra (NED) | Vacansoleil–DCM | 1 |

=== Stage 11 ===
Individual time trial – no climbs.

=== Stage 12 ===
Flat stage – no climbs.

=== Stage 13 ===
The details and results of the climbs on this stage are as follows:

Cote de Crotz – 77.5 km (Category 4)

This climb is 1.2 km at an average gradient of 4%.

| | Rider | Team | Points |
|---|---|---|---|
| 1 | Pierre Rolland (FRA) | Team Europcar | 1 |

=== Stage 14 ===
The details and results of the climbs on this stage are as follows:

Cote de Marcigny – 66.5 km (Category 4)

This climb is 6.9 km at an average gradient of 5.6%.

| | Rider | Team | Points |
|---|---|---|---|
| 1 | Simon Geschke (GER) | Argos–Shimano | 1 |

Côte de la Croix Couverte – 98.5 km (Category 4)

This climb is 6.9 km at an average gradient of 5.6%.

| | Rider | Team | Points |
|---|---|---|---|
| 1 | Jan Bakelants (BEL) | RadioShack–Leopard | 1 |

Côte de Thizy-les-Bourgs – 113 km (Category 3)

This climb is 6.9 km at an average gradient of 5.6%.

| | Rider | Team | Points |
|---|---|---|---|
| 1 | Blel Kadri (FRA) | Ag2r–La Mondiale | 2 |
| 2 | Tejay van Garderen (USA) | BMC Racing Team | 1 |

Col du Pilon (727 m) – 126.5 km (Category 3)

This climb is 6.9 km at an average gradient of 5.6%.

| | Rider | Team | Points |
|---|---|---|---|
| 1 | Blel Kadri (FRA) | Ag2r–La Mondiale | 2 |
| 2 | Andrew Talansky (USA) | Garmin–Sharp | 1 |

Côte de Lozanne – 161 km (Category 4)

This climb is 6.9 km at an average gradient of 5.6%.

| | Rider | Team | Points |
|---|---|---|---|
| 1 | Jens Voigt (GER) | RadioShack–Leopard | 1 |

Côte de la Duchère – 176 km (Category 4)

This climb is 6.9 km at an average gradient of 5.6%.

| | Rider | Team | Points |
|---|---|---|---|
| 1 | Michael Albasini (SUI) | Orica–GreenEDGE | 1 |

Côte de la Croix Rousse – 181.5 km (Category 4)

This climb is 6.9 km at an average gradient of 5.6%.

| | Rider | Team | Points |
|---|---|---|---|
| 1 | Julien Simon (FRA) | Sojasun | 1 |

=== Stage 15 – Mont Ventoux ===
The details and results of the climbs on this stage are as follows:

Cote d'Eyzin (436 m) – 20.5 km (Category 4)

| | Rider | Team | Points |
|---|---|---|---|
| 1 | Thomas De Gendt (BEL) | Vacansoleil–DCM | 1 |

Cote de Primarette (459 m) – 26.5 km (Category 4)

| | Rider | Team | Points |
|---|---|---|---|
| 1 | Pierre Rolland (FRA) | Team Europcar | 1 |

Cote de Lens-Lestang (424 m) – 44.5 km (Category 4)

| | Rider | Team | Points |
|---|---|---|---|
| 1 | Julien El Fares (FRA) | Sojasun | 1 |

Cote de Bourdeaux (651 m) – 143 km (Category 3)

| | Rider | Team | Points |
|---|---|---|---|
| 1 | Jérémy Roy (FRA) | FDJ.fr | 2 |
| 2 | Christophe Riblon (FRA) | Ag2r–La Mondiale | 1 |

Mont Ventoux (1912 m) – 242 km (Hors catégorie)

This climb is 20.8 km at an average gradient of 7.5%. Point awarded will be double for this climb.

| | Rider | Team | Points |
|---|---|---|---|
| 1 | Chris Froome (GBR) | Team Sky | 50 |
| 2 | Nairo Quintana (COL) | Movistar Team | 40 |
| 3 | Mikel Nieve (ESP) | Euskaltel–Euskadi | 32 |
| 4 | Joaquim Rodríguez (ESP) | Team Katusha | 28 |
| 5 | Roman Kreuziger (CZE) | Saxo–Tinkoff | 24 |
| 6 | Alberto Contador (ESP) | Saxo–Tinkoff | 20 |
| 7 | Jakob Fuglsang (DEN) | Astana | 16 |
| 8 | Bauke Mollema (NED) | Belkin Pro Cycling | 12 |
| 9 | Laurens ten Dam (NED) | Belkin Pro Cycling | 8 |
| 10 | Jean-Christophe Péraud (FRA) | Ag2r–La Mondiale | 4 |

=== Stage 16 ===
While Chris Froome led the mountains classification going into this stage, the polka dot jersey was worn by 3rd placed Mikel Nieve because Chris Froome also had the yellow jersey and 2nd placed Nairo Quintana held the white jersey. The details and results of the climbs on this stage are as follows:

Côte de la Montagne de Bluye – 17.5 km (Category 3)

This climb is 5.7 km at an average gradient of 5.6%.

| | Rider | Team | Points |
|---|---|---|---|
| 1 | Ryder Hesjedal (CAN) | Garmin–Sharp | 2 |
| 2 | Laurent Didier (LUX) | RadioShack–Leopard | 1 |

Col de Macuègne (1 068 m) – 48 km (Category 2)

This climb is 7.6 km at an average gradient of 5.2%.

| | Rider | Team | Points |
|---|---|---|---|
| 1 | Johnny Hoogerland (NED) | Vacansoleil–DCM | 5 |
| 2 | Laurent Didier (LUX) | RadioShack–Leopard | 3 |
| 3 | Jérôme Coppel (FRA) | Cofidis | 2 |
| 4 | Andreas Klöden (GER) | RadioShack–Leopard | 1 |

Col de Manse (1 268 m) – 156.5 km (Category 2)

This climb is 9.5 km at an average gradient of 5.2%.

| | Rider | Team | Points |
|---|---|---|---|
| 1 | Rui Costa (POR) | Movistar Team | 5 |
| 2 | Jérôme Coppel (FRA) | Cofidis | 3 |
| 3 | Christophe Riblon (FRA) | Ag2r–La Mondiale | 2 |
| 4 | Arnold Jeannesson (FRA) | FDJ.fr | 1 |

=== Stage 17 ===
While Chris Froome led the mountains classification going into this stage, the polka dot jersey was worn by 3rd placed Mikel Nieve because Chris Froome also had the yellow jersey and 2nd placed Nairo Quintana held the white jersey. This stage is the second Individual time trial and features two category 2 climbs. The details and results of the climbs on this stage are as follows:

Côte de Puy-Sanières – 6.5 km (Category 2)

This climb is 6.4 km at an average gradient of 6%.

| | Rider | Team | Points |
|---|---|---|---|
| 1 | Alberto Contador (ESP) | Saxo–Tinkoff | 5 |
| 2 | Chris Froome (GBR) | Team Sky | 3 |
| 3 | Joaquim Rodríguez (ESP) | Team Katusha | 2 |
| 4 | Alejandro Valverde (ESP) | Movistar Team | 1 |

Côte de Réallon – 20 km (Category 2)

This climb is 6.9 km at an average gradient of 6.3%.

| | Rider | Team | Points |
|---|---|---|---|
| 1 | Joaquim Rodríguez (ESP) | Team Katusha | 5 |
| 2 | Nairo Quintana (COL) | Movistar Team | 3 |
| 3 | Chris Froome (GBR) | Team Sky | 2 |
| 4 | Alejandro Valverde (ESP) | Movistar Team | 1 |

=== Stage 18 – Alpe d'Huez ===
While Chris Froome led the mountains classification going into this stage, the polka dot jersey was worn by 3rd placed Mikel Nieve because Chris Froome also had the yellow jersey and 2nd placed Nairo Quintana held the white jersey.

Col de Manse (1268 m) – 13 km (Category 2)

This climb is 6.6 km at an average gradient of 6.2%.

| | Rider | Team | Points |
|---|---|---|---|
| 1 | Ryder Hesjedal (CAN) | Garmin–Sharp | 5 |
| 2 | Arnold Jeannesson (FRA) | FDJ.fr | 3 |
| 3 | Thomas Voeckler (FRA) | Team Europcar | 2 |
| 4 | John Gadret (FRA) | Ag2r–La Mondiale | 1 |

Rampe du Motty (982 m) – 45 km (Category 3)

This climb is 2.4 km at an average gradient of 8%.

| | Rider | Team | Points |
|---|---|---|---|
| 1 | Tom Danielson (USA) | Garmin–Sharp | 2 |
| 2 | Christophe Riblon (FRA) | Ag2r–La Mondiale | 1 |

Col d'Ornon (1371 m) – 95 km (Category 2)

This climb is 5.1 km at an average gradient of 6.7%.

| | Rider | Team | Points |
|---|---|---|---|
| 1 | Arnold Jeannesson (FRA) | FDJ.fr | 5 |
| 2 | Sylvain Chavanel (FRA) | Omega Pharma–Quick-Step | 3 |
| 3 | Jens Voigt (GER) | RadioShack–Leopard | 2 |
| 4 | Tom Danielson (USA) | Garmin–Sharp | 1 |

Alpe d'Huez 1 (1765 m) – 122.5 km (Hors catégorie)

This climb is 12.3 km at an average gradient of 8.4%.

| | Rider | Team | Points |
|---|---|---|---|
| 1 | Moreno Moser (ITA) | Cannondale | 25 |
| 2 | Christophe Riblon (FRA) | Ag2r–La Mondiale | 20 |
| 3 | Tejay van Garderen (USA) | BMC Racing Team | 16 |
| 4 | Jens Voigt (GER) | RadioShack–Leopard | 14 |
| 5 | Tom Danielson (USA) | Garmin–Sharp | 12 |
| 6 | Arnold Jeannesson (FRA) | FDJ.fr | 10 |
| 7 | Lars Boom (NED) | Belkin Pro Cycling | 8 |
| 8 | Andrey Amador (CRC) | Movistar Team | 6 |
| 9 | Sylvain Chavanel (FRA) | Omega Pharma–Quick-Step | 4 |
| 10 | Mikel Nieve (ESP) | Euskaltel–Euskadi | 2 |

Col de Sarenne (1999 m) – 131.5 km (Category 2)

This climb is 3 km at an average gradient of 7.8%.

| | Rider | Team | Points |
|---|---|---|---|
| 1 | Tejay van Garderen (USA) | BMC Racing Team | 5 |
| 2 | Christophe Riblon (FRA) | Ag2r–La Mondiale | 3 |
| 3 | Jens Voigt (GER) | RadioShack–Leopard | 2 |
| 4 | Moreno Moser (ITA) | Cannondale | 1 |

Alpe d'Huez 2 (1850 m) – 172.5 km (Hors catégorie)

This climb is 13.8 km at an average gradient of 8.1%. Points for this climb are doubled because it is a stage finish on a climb above category 2.

| | Rider | Team | Points |
|---|---|---|---|
| 1 | Christophe Riblon (FRA) | Ag2r–La Mondiale | 50 |
| 2 | Tejay van Garderen (USA) | BMC Racing Team | 40 |
| 3 | Moreno Moser (ITA) | Cannondale | 32 |
| 4 | Nairo Quintana (COL) | Movistar Team | 28 |
| 5 | Joaquim Rodríguez (ESP) | Team Katusha | 24 |
| 6 | Richie Porte (AUS) | Team Sky | 20 |
| 7 | Chris Froome (GBR) | Team Sky | 16 |
| 8 | Alejandro Valverde (ESP) | Movistar Team | 12 |
| 9 | Mikel Nieve (ESP) | Euskaltel–Euskadi | 8 |
| 10 | Jakob Fuglsang (DEN) | Astana | 4 |

=== Stage 19 – Col du Glandon and Col de la Madeleine ===
While Chris Froome led the mountains classification going into this stage, the polka dot jersey was worn by 3rd placed Christophe Riblon because Chris Froome also had the yellow jersey and 2nd placed Nairo Quintana held the white jersey.

Col du Glandon (1924 m) – 33.5 km (Hors catégorie)

This climb is 21.6 km at an average gradient of 5.1%.

| | Rider | Team | Points |
|---|---|---|---|
| 1 | Ryder Hesjedal (CAN) | Garmin–Sharp | 25 |
| 2 | Jon Izagirre (ESP) | Euskaltel–Euskadi | 20 |
| 3 | Christophe Riblon (FRA) | Ag2r–La Mondiale | 16 |
| 4 | Moreno Moser (ITA) | Cannondale | 14 |
| 5 | Pierre Rolland (FRA) | Team Europcar | 12 |
| 6 | Mikel Nieve (ESP) | Euskaltel–Euskadi | 10 |
| 7 | Blel Kadri (FRA) | Ag2r–La Mondiale | 8 |
| 8 | Tony Martin (GER) | Omega Pharma–Quick-Step | 6 |
| 9 | Johnny Hoogerland (NED) | Vacansoleil–DCM | 4 |
| 10 | Laurent Didier (LUX) | RadioShack–Leopard | 2 |

Col de la Madeleine (2000 m) – 83.5 km (Hors catégorie)

This climb is 19.2 km at an average gradient of 7.9%.

| | Rider | Team | Points |
|---|---|---|---|
| 1 | Pierre Rolland (FRA) | Team Europcar | 25 |
| 2 | Ryder Hesjedal (CAN) | Garmin–Sharp | 20 |
| 3 | Mikel Nieve (ESP) | Euskaltel–Euskadi | 16 |
| 4 | Jan Bakelants (BEL) | RadioShack–Leopard | 14 |
| 5 | Simon Geschke (GER) | Argos–Shimano | 12 |
| 6 | Rui Costa (POR) | Movistar Team | 10 |
| 7 | Laurent Didier (LUX) | RadioShack–Leopard | 8 |
| 8 | Romain Sicard (FRA) | Euskaltel–Euskadi | 6 |
| 9 | Andreas Klöden (GER) | RadioShack–Leopard | 4 |
| 10 | Rubén Plaza (ESP) | Movistar Team | 2 |

Col de Tamié (907 m) – 143 km (Category 2)

This climb is 8.6 km at an average gradient of 6.2%.

| | Rider | Team | Points |
|---|---|---|---|
| 1 | Pierre Rolland (FRA) | Team Europcar | 5 |
| 2 | Romain Sicard (FRA) | Euskaltel–Euskadi | 3 |
| 3 | José Serpa (COL) | Lampre–Merida | 2 |
| 4 | Bart De Clercq (BEL) | Lotto–Belisol | 1 |

Col de l'Épine – 165 km (Category 1)

This climb is 6.1 km at an average gradient of 7.3%.

| | Rider | Team | Points |
|---|---|---|---|
| 1 | Pierre Rolland (FRA) | Team Europcar | 10 |
| 2 | Mikel Nieve (ESP) | Euskaltel–Euskadi | 8 |
| 3 | Jan Bakelants (BEL) | RadioShack–Leopard | 6 |
| 4 | Jérôme Coppel (FRA) | Cofidis | 4 |
| 5 | Tom Dumoulin (NED) | Argos–Shimano | 2 |
| 6 | Daniel Navarro (ESP) | Cofidis | 1 |

Col de la Croix Fry (1477 m) – 191.5 km (Category 1)

This climb is 11.3 km at an average gradient of 7%.

| | Rider | Team | Points |
|---|---|---|---|
| 1 | Rui Costa (POR) | Movistar Team | 10 |
| 2 | Andreas Klöden (GER) | RadioShack–Leopard | 8 |
| 3 | Jan Bakelants (BEL) | RadioShack–Leopard | 6 |
| 4 | Daniel Navarro (ESP) | Cofidis | 4 |
| 5 | Bart De Clercq (BEL) | Lotto–Belisol | 2 |
| 6 | Mikel Nieve (ESP) | Euskaltel–Euskadi | 1 |

=== Stage 20 – Annecy–Semnoz ===
While Chris Froome led the mountains classification going into this stage, the polka dot jersey was worn by 2nd placed Pierre Rolland because Chris Froome also had the yellow jersey.

Côte du Puget (796 m) – 12.5 km (Category 2)

This climb is 5.4 km at an average gradient of 5.9%.

| | Rider | Team | Points |
|---|---|---|---|
| 1 | Pierre Rolland (FRA) | Team Europcar | 5 |
| 2 | Juan Antonio Flecha (ESP) | Vacansoleil–DCM | 3 |
| 3 | Jens Voigt (GER) | RadioShack–Leopard | 2 |
| 4 | Marcus Burghardt (GER) | BMC Racing Team | 1 |

Col de Leschaux (944 m) – 17.5 km (Category 3)

This climb is 3.6 km at an average gradient of 6.1%.

| | Rider | Team | Points |
|---|---|---|---|
| 1 | Igor Antón (ESP) | Euskaltel–Euskadi | 2 |
| 2 | Pierre Rolland (FRA) | Team Europcar | 1 |

Côte d'Aillon-le-Vieux (929 m) – 43 km (Category 3)

This climb is 6 km at an average gradient of 4%.

| | Rider | Team | Points |
|---|---|---|---|
| 1 | Pierre Rolland (FRA) | Team Europcar | 2 |
| 2 | Christophe Riblon (FRA) | Ag2r–La Mondiale | 1 |

Col des Prés (1142 m) – 51 km (Category 3)

This climb is 3.4 km at an average gradient of 6.9%.

| | Rider | Team | Points |
|---|---|---|---|
| 1 | Pierre Rolland (FRA) | Team Europcar | 2 |
| 2 | Igor Antón (ESP) | Euskaltel–Euskadi | 1 |

Mont Revard (1463 m) – 78.5 km (Category 1)

This climb is 15.9 km at an average gradient of 5.6%.

| | Rider | Team | Points |
|---|---|---|---|
| 1 | Jens Voigt (GER) | RadioShack–Leopard | 10 |
| 2 | Igor Antón (ESP) | Euskaltel–Euskadi | 8 |
| 3 | Pierre Rolland (FRA) | Team Europcar | 6 |
| 4 | Christophe Riblon (FRA) | Ag2r–La Mondiale | 4 |
| 5 | Philippe Gilbert (BEL) | BMC Racing Team | 2 |
| 6 | Tejay van Garderen (USA) | BMC Racing Team | 1 |

Annecy-Semnoz (1655 m) – 125 km (Hors catégorie)

This climb is 10.7 km at an average gradient of 8.5%. Points for this climb are doubled because it is also the stage finish.

| | Rider | Team | Points |
|---|---|---|---|
| 1 | Nairo Quintana (COL) | Movistar Team | 50 |
| 2 | Joaquim Rodríguez (ESP) | Team Katusha | 40 |
| 3 | Chris Froome (GBR) | Team Sky | 32 |
| 4 | Alejandro Valverde (ESP) | Movistar Team | 28 |
| 5 | Richie Porte (AUS) | Team Sky | 24 |
| 6 | Andrew Talansky (USA) | Garmin–Sharp | 20 |
| 7 | Alberto Contador (ESP) | Saxo–Tinkoff | 16 |
| 8 | John Gadret (FRA) | Ag2r–La Mondiale | 12 |
| 9 | Jesús Hernández (ESP) | Saxo–Tinkoff | 8 |
| 10 | Roman Kreuziger (CZE) | Saxo–Tinkoff | 4 |

As well as winning the stage and the final climb, Nairo Quintana also became the 2013 King of the Mountains.

=== Stage 21 ===
The 2013 Tour de France King of the Mountains Niaro Quintana wore the polka-dot jersey on the final stage of the 100th tour.

Côte de Saint-Rémy-lès-Chevreuse – 29.5 km (Category 4)

This climb is 1 km at an average gradient of 6.9%.

| | Rider | Team | Points |
|---|---|---|---|
| 1 | Gert Steegmans (BEL) | Omega Pharma–Quick-Step | 1 |

Côte de Châteaufort (Stèle Jacques Anquetil) – 33.5 km (Category 4)

This climb is 0.9 km at an average gradient of 4.7%.

| | Rider | Team | Points |
|---|---|---|---|
| 1 | José Joaquín Rojas (ESP) | Movistar Team | 1 |
