= Serres, Hautes-Alpes =

Serres
- Commune
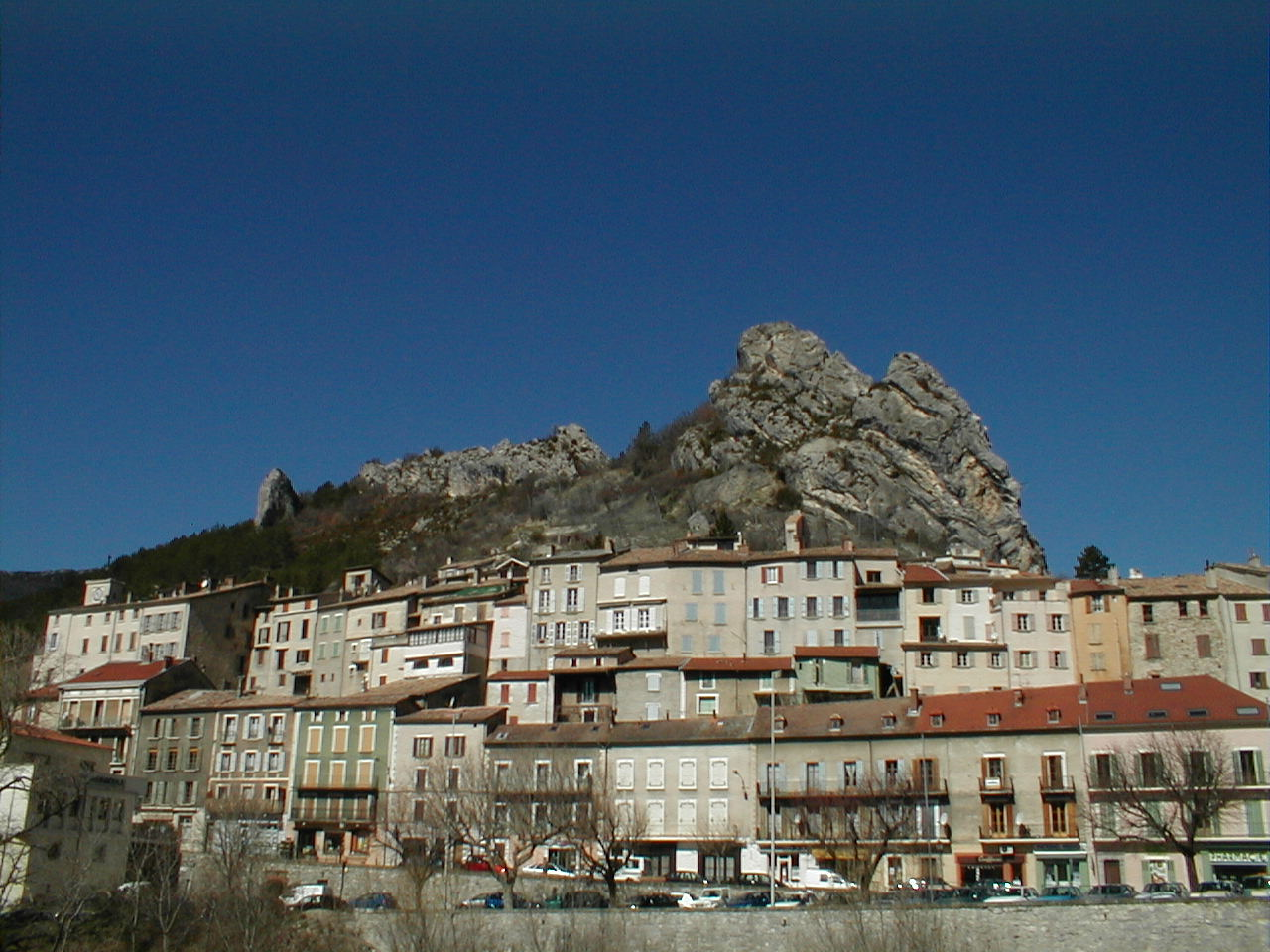
- A general view of the village of Serres

- Coat of arms
- Location of Serres
- Location within France Location within Provence-Alpes-Côte d'Azur
- Coordinates: 44°25′46″N 5°42′56″E
- Country: France
- Region: Provence-Alpes-Côte d'Azur
- Department: Hautes-Alpes
- Arrondissement: Gap
- Canton: Serres

Government
  - Mayor (2026–32): Daniel Rouit
- Area^{1}: 18.57 km^{2} (7.17 sq mi)
- Elevation: 680 m (2,230 ft)
- Highest elevation: 1,431 m (4,695 ft)
- Lowest elevation: 633 m (2,077 ft)
- Population (2023): 1,298
  - Density: 69.90/km^{2} (181.0/sq mi)
- Time zone: UTC+01:00 (CET)
  - Summer (DST): UTC+02:00 (CEST)
- INSEE/Postal code: 05166 /05700
- ^{1} French Land Register data, which excludes lakes, ponds, glaciers > 1 km^{2} (0.386 sq mi or 247 acres) and river estuaries.

Serres (French pronunciation: [sɛʁ]; Vivaro-Alpine: Sèrres) is a commune in the Hautes-Alpes department in southeastern France.

== Geography ==
Serres is located in the south of the French Alps.

== History ==
Serres is located in a region called Dauphiné which, centuries ago, was traditionally given as a fief to the Dauphin (the heir to the throne). Former medieval stronghold built at the entrance of a pass through which flows the river Buëch, it is rich in local history - notably because of the role of the Duke of Lesdiguières during the religious wars at the end of the 16th century.

== Population ==
Historical population
Year	Pop.	±% p.a.
1968	1,256	—
1975	1,283	+0.30%
1982	1,200	−0.95%
1990	1,106	−1.01%
1999	1,204	+0.95%
2007	1,322	+1.18%
2012	1,241	−1.26%
2017	1,287	+0.73%
2023	1,298	+0.14%
Source: INSEE

== Transportation ==
Serres is located at the junction of route des deux-soleils (N75) and route des baronnies (D994), not far from the larger towns of Gap and Sisteron. It has a railway station on the line from Aix-en-Provence to Gap.

== Culture ==
Several associations very active in the village offer cultural events of high quality in various domains such as promotion of Serres exceptional historical architecture and traditions, contemporary art, and a jazz festival which has become a very famous musical event.

Les Amis de Serres : this association aims to promote tourism, the rich history of the village, and maintain the magnificent architectural treasures as well as the environmental quality of life. The Association organises various events, like Serres à la lumière du passé, with the participation of artistic craftworkers (luthiers, iron craftsmen, tapestry makers, embroiderers ...), artists (musicians, singers, dancers...) et presentation of ancient shops of the village.

Serres Lez'Arts, association of the artists of Serres, which presents, amongst others, contemporary art events, especially the annual open day exhibitions. About 25 artists, painters, sculptors, etc... present their work during three days at the end of September. This events gathers more than 300 drawings, paintings, sculptures, etc...

Blue Buëch, the association who has organized since 2002 Serres Jazz Festival every summer, during approximately one week at the end of July. The programme includes every kind of Jazz music, classical, standard, manouche, vocal, blues, etc... provided it be of high quality, which is the basis of the recognition of Serres Jazz amongst the top great festivals. During the rest of the year, the association organizes, together with partners such as Musique au Coeur des Baronnies, concerts illustrating the dialogue between classical and Jazz music.

== See also ==
- Communes of the Hautes-Alpes department
