= Châtel-en-Trièves =

- Commune
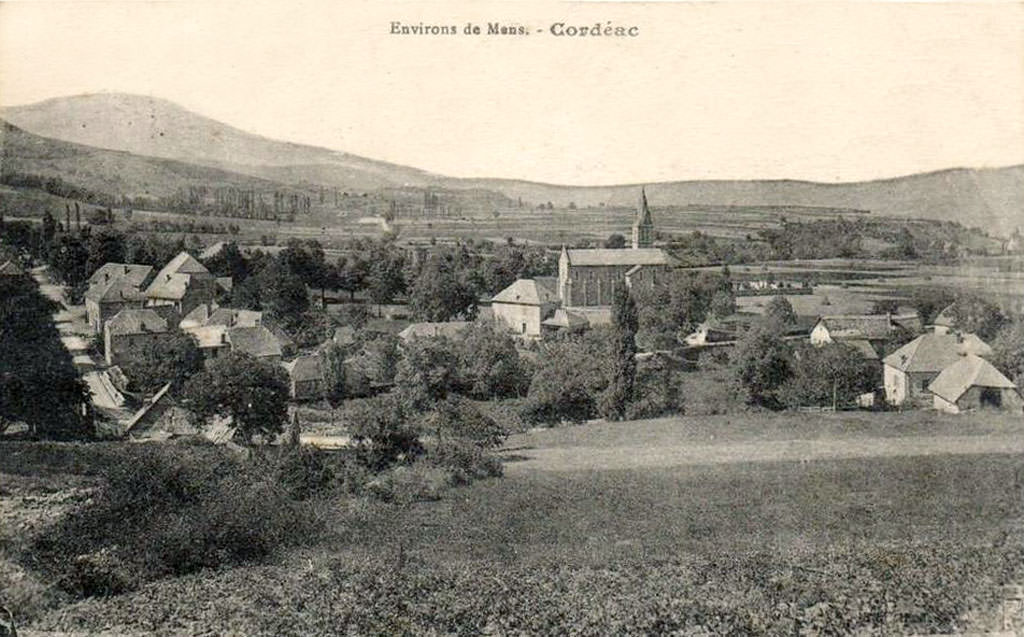
- Cordéac at the start of the 20th century
- Location of Châtel-en-Trièves
- Location within France Location within Auvergne-Rhône-Alpes
- Coordinates: 44°50′53″N 5°48′00″E
- Country: France
- Region: Auvergne-Rhône-Alpes
- Department: Isère
- Arrondissement: Grenoble
- Canton: Matheysine-Trièves
- Intercommunality: Trièves

Government
  - Mayor (2020–2026): Fanny Lacroix
- Area^{1}: 47.60 km^{2} (18.38 sq mi)
- Population (2023): 491
  - Density: 10.3/km^{2} (26.7/sq mi)
- Time zone: UTC+01:00 (CET)
  - Summer (DST): UTC+02:00 (CEST)
- INSEE/Postal code: 38456 /38710
- ^{1} French Land Register data, which excludes lakes, ponds, glaciers > 1 km^{2} (0.386 sq mi or 247 acres) and river estuaries.

Châtel-en-Trièves (French pronunciation: [ʃatɛl ɑ̃ tʁijɛv]) is a commune in the department of Isère, southeastern France. The municipality was established on 1 January 2017 by merger of the former communes of Saint-Sébastien (the seat) and Cordéac.

== See also ==
- Communes of the Isère department
