= Saint-Sébastien, Isère =

Saint-Sébastien
- Part of Châtel-en-Trièves
- Location of Saint-Sébastien
- Location within France Location within Auvergne-Rhône-Alpes
- Coordinates: 44°50′54″N 5°48′00″E
- Country: France
- Region: Auvergne-Rhône-Alpes
- Department: Isère
- Arrondissement: Grenoble
- Canton: Matheysine-Trièves
- Commune: Châtel-en-Trièves
- Area^{1}: 21 km^{2} (8.1 sq mi)
- Elevation: 845 m (2,772 ft)
- Highest elevation: 1,931 m (6,335 ft)
- Lowest elevation: 579 m (1,900 ft)
- Population (2023): 268
  - Density: 13/km^{2} (33/sq mi)
- Time zone: UTC+01:00 (CET)
  - Summer (DST): UTC+02:00 (CEST)
- Postal code: 38710
- ^{1} French Land Register data, which excludes lakes, ponds, glaciers > 1 km^{2} (0.386 sq mi or 247 acres) and river estuaries.

Saint-Sébastien (French pronunciation: [sɛ̃ sebastjɛ̃]) is a former commune in the Isère department in southeastern France. On 1 January 2017, it was merged into the new commune Châtel-en-Trièves.

== See also ==
- Communes of the Isère department
