= Cordéac =

- Part of Châtel-en-Trièves
- Location of Cordéac
- Location within France Location within Auvergne-Rhône-Alpes
- Coordinates: 44°49′41″N 5°50′20″E
- Country: France
- Region: Auvergne-Rhône-Alpes
- Department: Isère
- Arrondissement: Grenoble
- Canton: Matheysine-Trièves
- Commune: Châtel-en-Trièves
- Area^{1}: 27 km^{2} (10 sq mi)
- Highest elevation: 2,793 m (9,163 ft)
- Lowest elevation: 579 m (1,900 ft)
- Population (2023): 223
  - Density: 8.3/km^{2} (21/sq mi)
- Time zone: UTC+01:00 (CET)
  - Summer (DST): UTC+02:00 (CEST)
- Postal code: 38710
- ^{1} French Land Register data, which excludes lakes, ponds, glaciers > 1 km^{2} (0.386 sq mi or 247 acres) and river estuaries.

Cordéac (French pronunciation: [kɔʁdeak]; Occitan: Cordeac) is a former commune in the Isère department in southeastern France. On 1 January 2017, it was merged into the new commune Châtel-en-Trièves.

== See also ==
- Communes of the Isère department
- Grande Tête de l'Obiou
