= Aspres-sur-Buëch =

- Commune
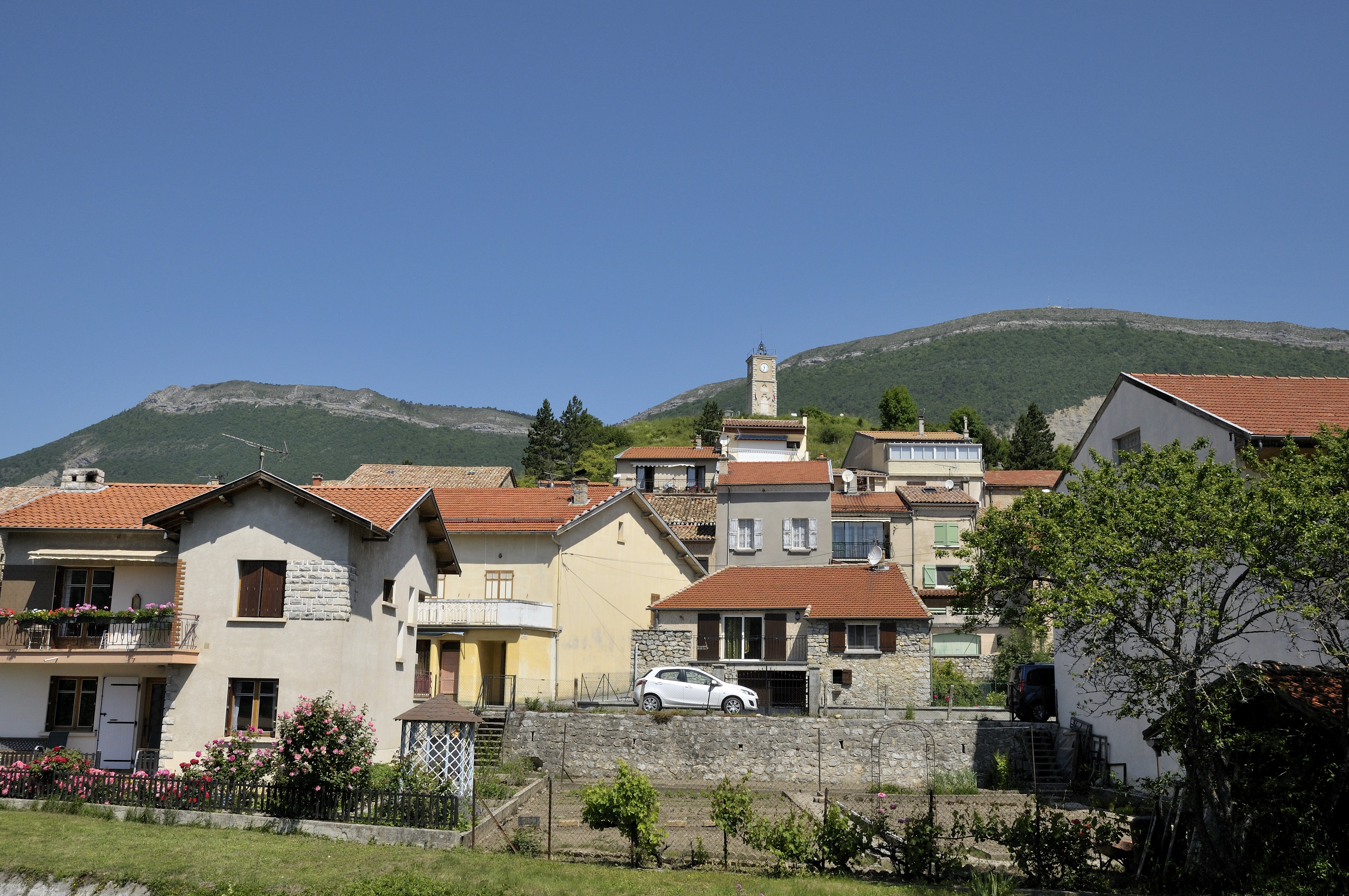
- A view of Aspres-sur-Buëch, with the clock tower overlooking the village

- Coat of arms
- Location of Aspres-sur-Buëch
- Location within France Location within Provence-Alpes-Côte d'Azur
- Coordinates: 44°31′28″N 5°45′01″E
- Country: France
- Region: Provence-Alpes-Côte d'Azur
- Department: Hautes-Alpes
- Arrondissement: Gap
- Canton: Serres
- Intercommunality: Buëch Dévoluy

Government
  - Mayor (2026–32): Françoise Pinet
- Area^{1}: 42.65 km^{2} (16.47 sq mi)
- Elevation: 761 m (2,497 ft)
- Highest elevation: 2,063 m (6,768 ft)
- Lowest elevation: 727 m (2,385 ft)
- Population (2023): 828
  - Density: 19.4/km^{2} (50.3/sq mi)
- Time zone: UTC+01:00 (CET)
  - Summer (DST): UTC+02:00 (CEST)
- INSEE/Postal code: 05010 /05140
- ^{1} French Land Register data, which excludes lakes, ponds, glaciers > 1 km^{2} (0.386 sq mi or 247 acres) and river estuaries.

Aspres-sur-Buëch (French pronunciation: [aspʁ syʁ bɥɛʃ], literally Aspres on Buëch; Occitan: Aspres de Buech) is a commune in the Hautes-Alpes department in southeastern France.

== Population ==
Historical population
Year	Pop.	±% p.a.
1968	750	—
1975	696	−1.06%
1982	773	+1.51%
1990	743	−0.49%
1999	762	+0.28%
2007	752	−0.16%
2012	824	+1.85%
2017	821	−0.07%
2023	828	+0.14%
Source: INSEE

== See also ==
- Communes of the Hautes-Alpes department
