= Col de l'Épine (Haute-Savoie) =

Mountain pass in the French Alps

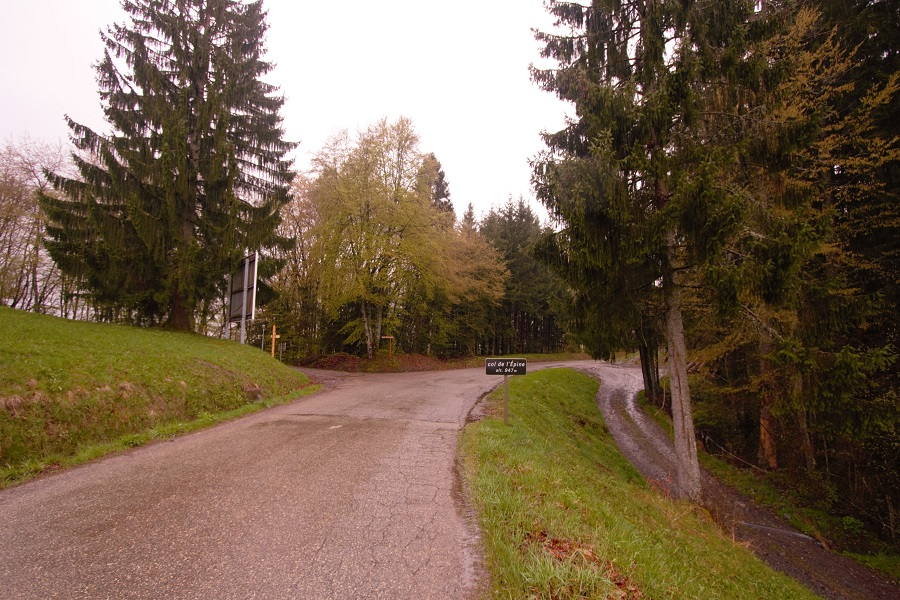

- Location within France
- Elevation: 947 metres (3,107 ft)
- Traversed by: D162

Third Approach
- Location: Haute-Savoie, France
- Range: Alps
- Coordinates: 45°46′45″N 6°20′56″E

Col de l'Épine (elevation 947 m (3,107 ft)) is a paved mountain pass in the Aravis range in the Alps. Located in the department of the Haute-Savoie, it connects Marlens to Serraval. It is reached and crossed by the route départementale D16 local road.

== Appearances in the Tour de France ==
The Tour de France crossed the Col de l'Épine in 1995, 2007 and 2013. 1995 and 2013 were categorized climbs.

Year	Stage	Category	Start	Finish	Leader at the summit*
2013	19	1	Le Bourg-d'Oisans	Le Grand-Bornand	Pierre Rolland (FRA)
1995	9	3	Le Grand-Bornand	La Plagne	Richard Virenque (FRA)
