= Grande Tête de l'Obiou =

Mountain in France

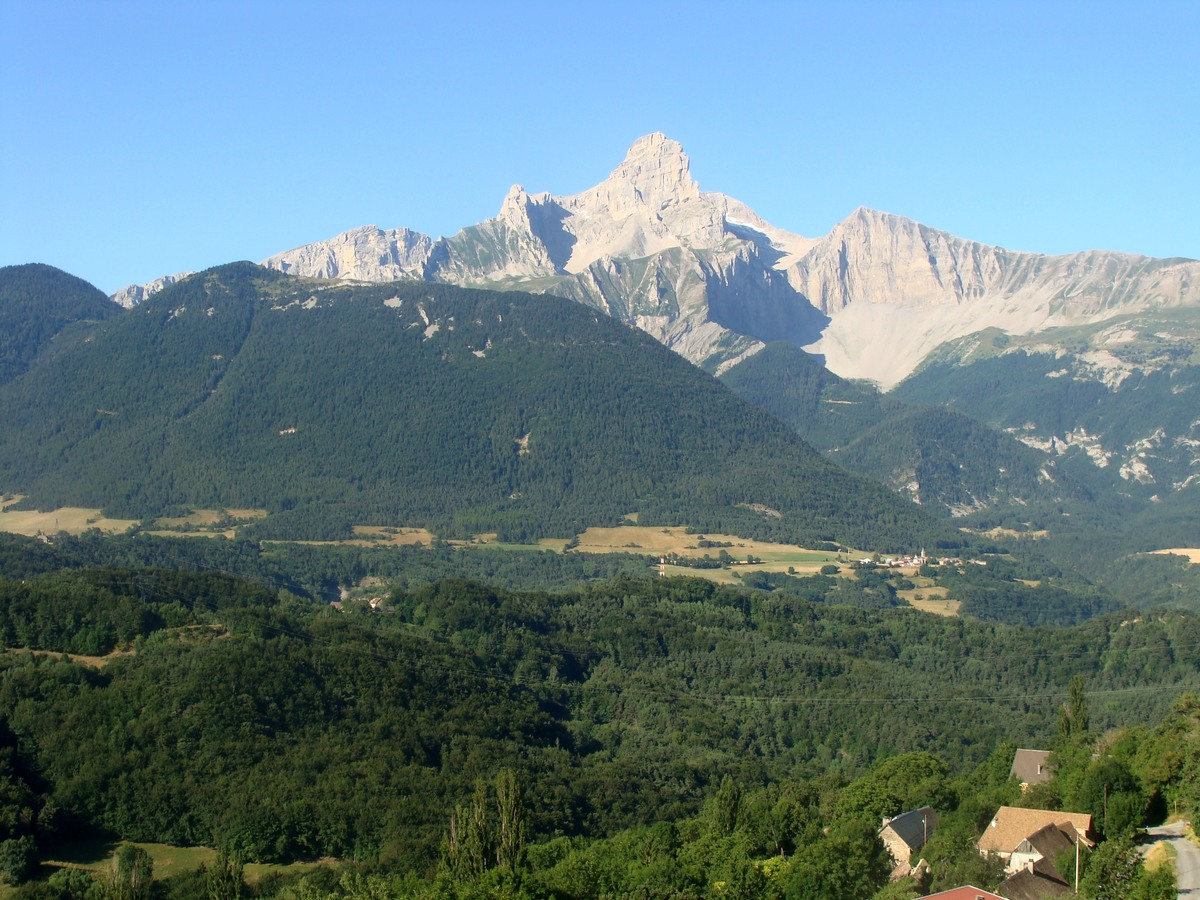
- The mountain seen from Route Napoléon (RN85)

Highest point
- Elevation: 2,790 m (9,150 ft)
- Prominence: 1,542 m (5,059 ft)
- Isolation: 21.99 km (13.66 mi)
- Listing: Ultra
- Coordinates: 44°46′31″N 05°50′22″E

Geography
- Location within Alps
- Location: Rhône-Alpes, France
- Parent range: Dévoluy Mountains, Dauphiné Prealps

Climbing
- Easiest route: southern slopes

The Grande Tête de l'Obiou (French pronunciation: [ɡʁɑ̃d tɛt də lɔbju]; or simply l'Obiou) is a mountain in the French Prealps belonging to the French department of Isère. It is the highest peak of the Dévoluy Mountains and of the Dauphiné Prealps and the seventh most prominent summit of metropolitan France.

== Geography ==
Administratively the mountain is divided between the French communes of Cordéac (NE slopes) and Monestier-d'Ambel (SW slopes).

== Access to the summit ==
The easiest route for the summit starts from Baumes hut and ascends the southern slopes of the mountain through the Faïsses pass and the Obiou pass (l'Épaule).

== See also ==
- List of French mountains by prominence

== Maps ==
- French official cartography (Institut géographique national - IGN); on-line version: www.geoportail.fr

== Bibliography ==
- Claude Péquignot, Sa Majesté l'Obiou, 2004
- Louis-Edmond Hamelin, L'Obiou entre Dieu et diable, 1990, extraits
- Fabienne Gilbertas, 60 ans, après l'accident de l'Obiou. Recueil de témoignages des sauveteurs, le 60ème anniversaire de la catastrophe, 2010
