= Le Tabor =

Mountain in France

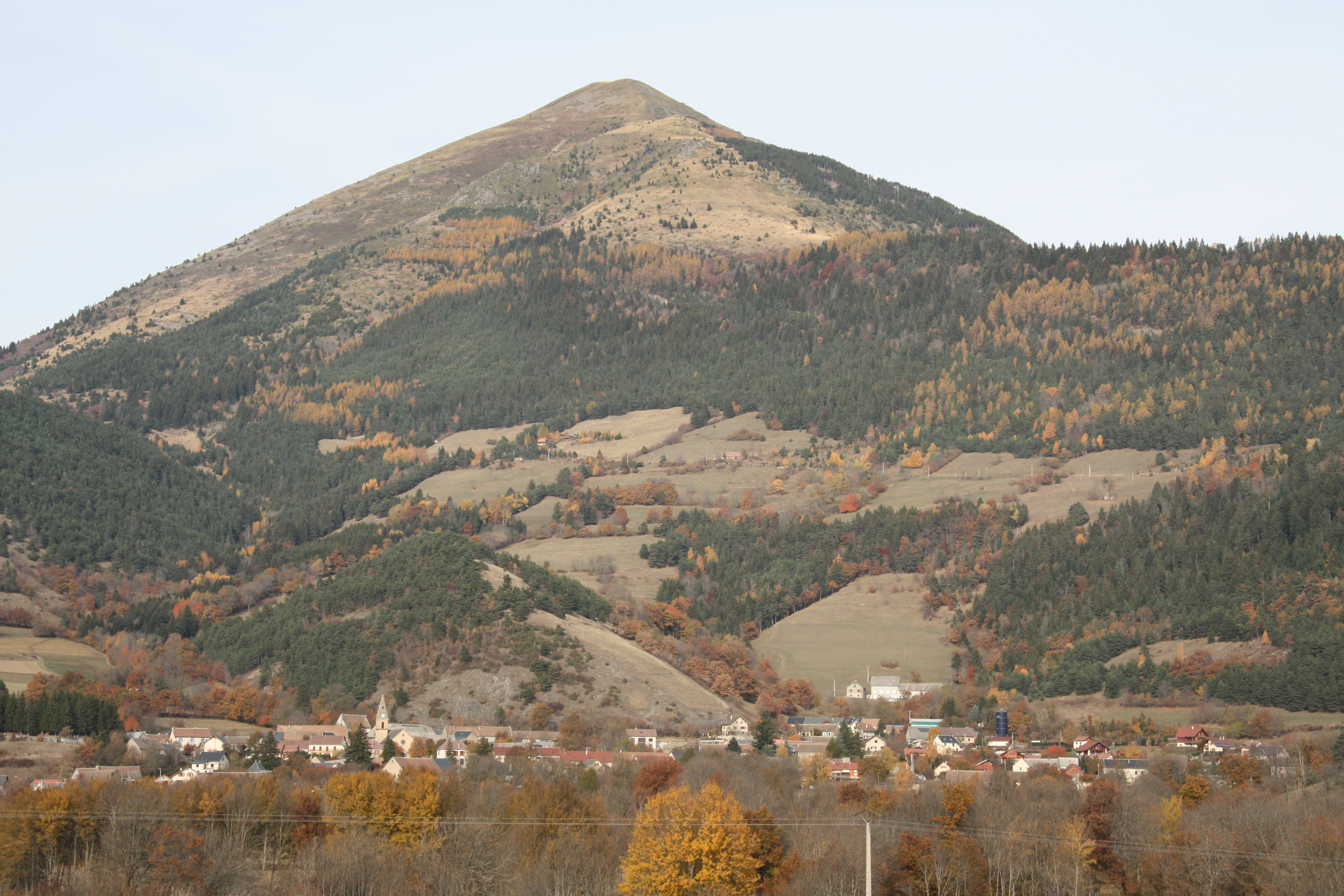
- Le Tabor, October 2009

Highest point
- Elevation: 2,389 m (7,838 ft)
- Prominence: 1,022 m (3,353 ft)
- Coordinates: 44°59′N 05°51′E

Geography
- Location within France
- Location: Isère, France
- Parent range: Dauphine Alps

Le Tabor is a mountain in the Isère department of France.
