= Mont Lachat =

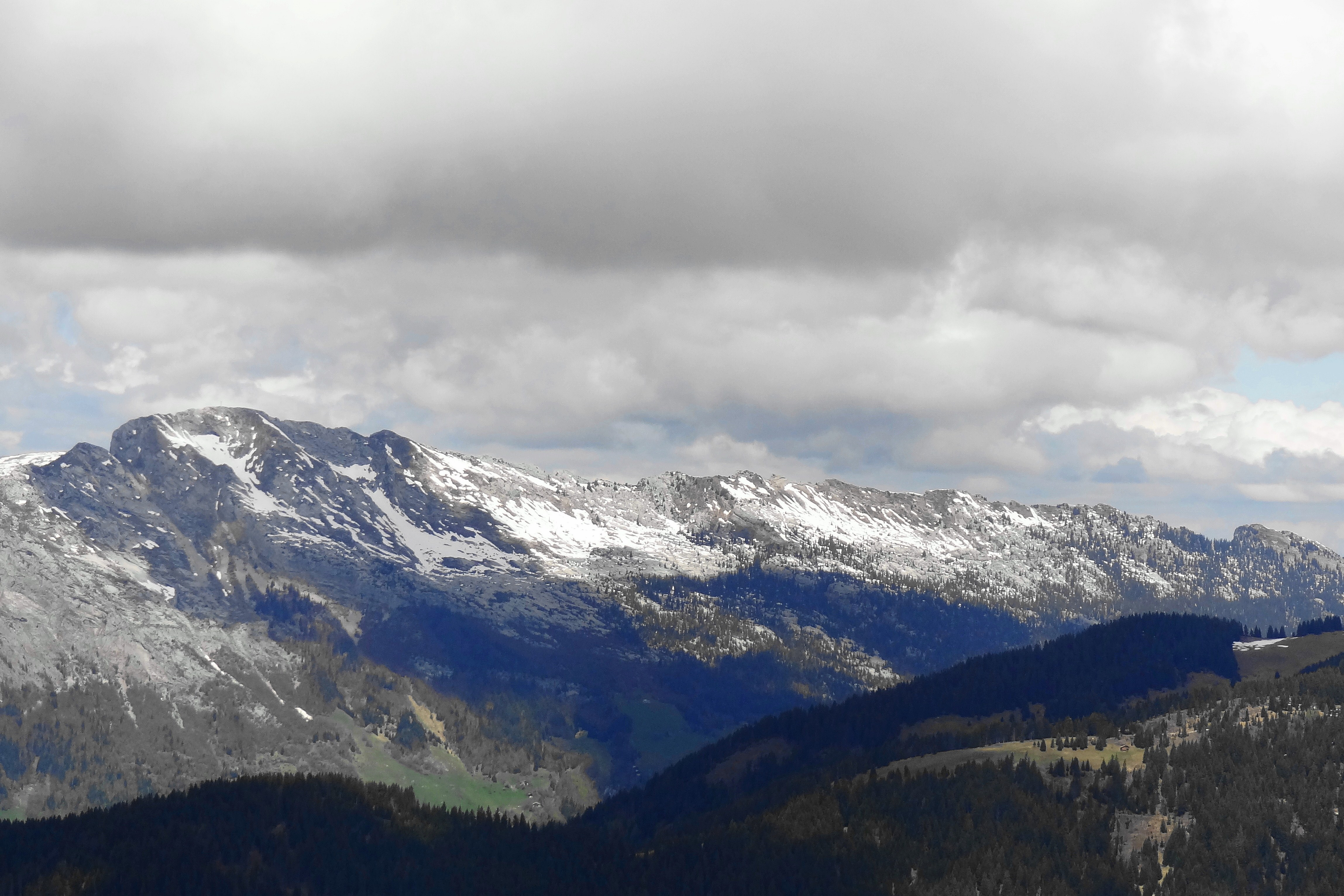
- Mont Lachat

Highest point
- Elevation: 2,023 m (6,637 ft)
- Prominence: 1,064 m (3,491 ft)
- Coordinates: 45°55′39″N 6°21′05″E

Geography
- Location within Alps
- Location: Rhône-Alpes, France
- Parent range: Bornes Massif

The Mont Lachat is a summit in the French Alps, culminating at a height of 2,023 m (6,637 ft) in the Bornes Massif.
