= Col de Macuègne =

Mountain pass in France

- Location within Alps
- Elevation: 1,068 metres (3,504 ft)
- Traversed by: D542

Third Approach
- Location: Drôme, France
- Range: Montagne d'Albion / Mont Ventoux
- Coordinates: 44°10′55″N 5°30′36″E

The Col de Macuègne (1,068 m (3,504 ft)) is a mountain pass located in the Dauphiné Prealps, on the northern slopes of Mont Ventoux between Montbrun-les-Bains and Séderon in the Drôme department of France. The road over the col is used occasionally by the Tour de France cycle race with the tour crossing the pass on Stage 16 of the 2013 Tour.

== Details of the climb ==
The climb commences at Montbrun-les-Bains (west) from where it is 9.2 km (5.7 mi) long, climbing 470 m (1,542 ft) at an average gradient of 5.1%. From the east, the climb starts at Séderon, from where there are 5.5 km (3.4 mi) to the summit of no great difficulty.

From the pass, a minor road crosses the Col de l'Homme Mort (1,212 m (3,976 ft)) en route to Sault.

== Tour de France ==
The tour has crossed the pass twice before 2013, on Stage 16 of the 1956 Tour and on Stage 14 of the 1970 Tour; on both occasions, it was not classified for the King of the Mountains competition.

On 16 July 2013, the pass was crossed on Stage 16 between Vaison-la-Romaine and Gap. It was ranked as a Second Category climb. The leader over the summit was Johnny Hoogerland.
