= Col de la Croix Haute =

Mountain pass in the French Alps

Col de la Croix-Haute
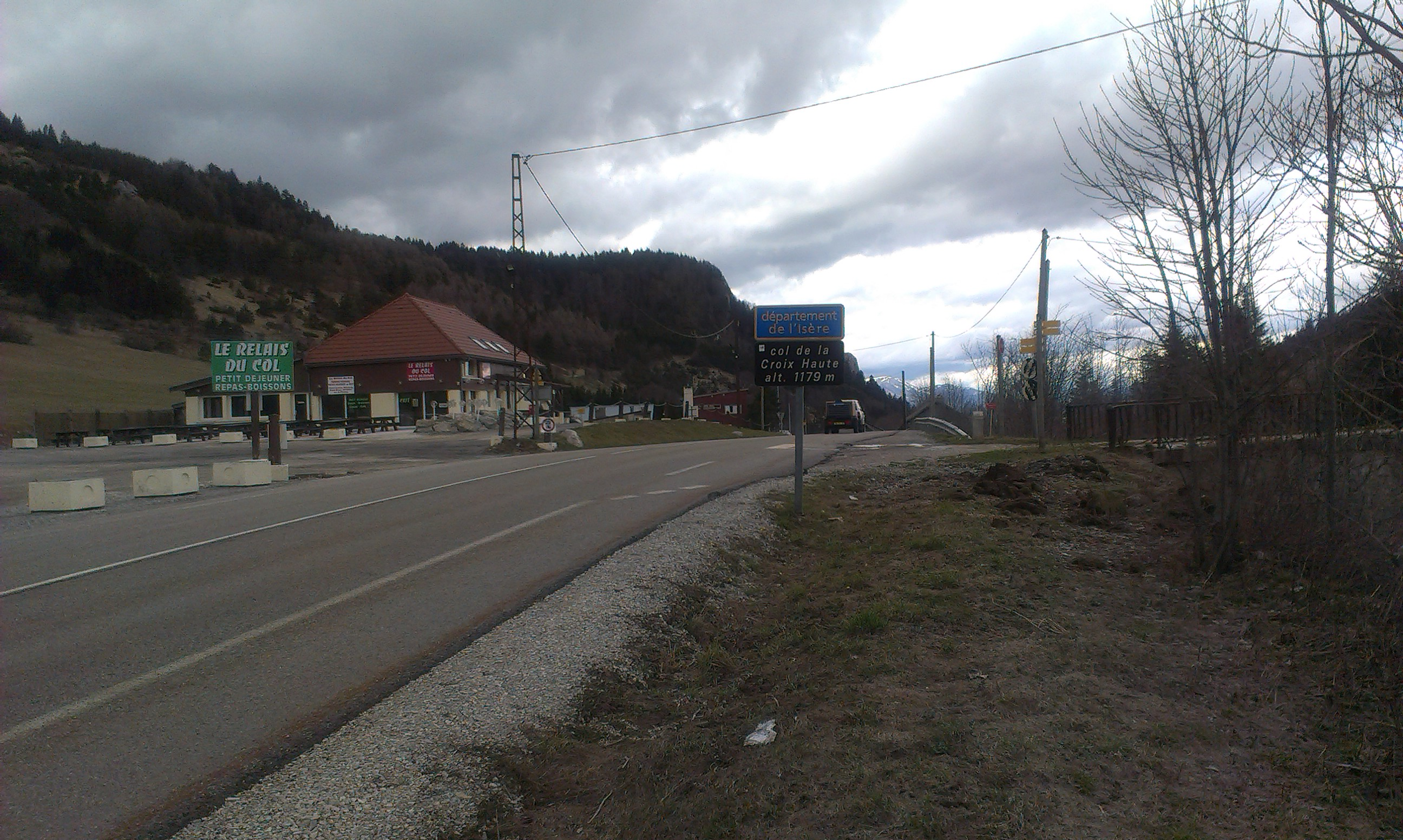

- Location within Alps
- Elevation: 1,179 m (3,868 ft)
- Traversed by: D1075 and Ligne de Lyon-Perrache à Marseille-Saint-Charles (via Grenoble)

Location
- Location: Isère/Drôme, France
- Range: Alps
- Coordinates: 44°43′26″N 05°40′39″E

Col de la Croix-Haute (el. 1,179 m.) is a high mountain pass in the French Dauphiné Alps on the border of the Isère and Drôme departments, linking the towns of Clelles and Mens in the North with Lus-la-Croix-Haute in the South.

== See also ==
- List of highest paved roads in Europe
- List of mountain passes
