= Clelles =

- Commune
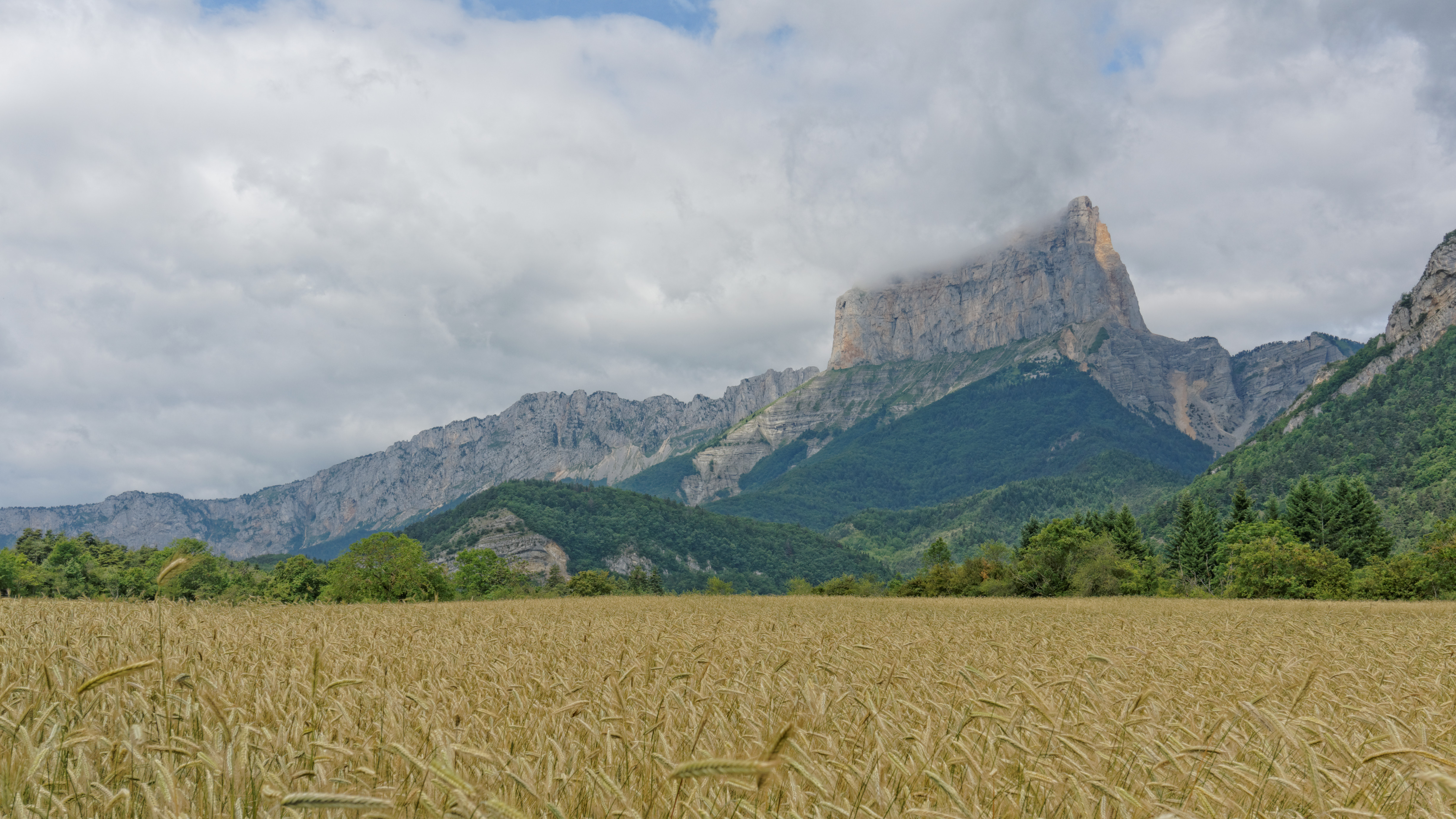
- Mont Aiguille seen from Clelles
- Location of Clelles
- Location within France Location within Auvergne-Rhône-Alpes
- Coordinates: 44°49′41″N 5°37′26″E
- Country: France
- Region: Auvergne-Rhône-Alpes
- Department: Isère
- Arrondissement: Grenoble
- Canton: Matheysine-Trièves

Government
  - Mayor (2020–2026): Alain Roche
- Area^{1}: 21 km^{2} (8.1 sq mi)
- Elevation: 831 m (2,726 ft)
- Highest elevation: 1,560 m (5,120 ft)
- Lowest elevation: 520 m (1,710 ft)
- Population (2023): 596
  - Density: 28/km^{2} (74/sq mi)
- Time zone: UTC+01:00 (CET)
  - Summer (DST): UTC+02:00 (CEST)
- INSEE/Postal code: 38113 /38930
- ^{1} French Land Register data, which excludes lakes, ponds, glaciers > 1 km^{2} (0.386 sq mi or 247 acres) and river estuaries.

Clelles (French pronunciation: [klɛl]; Occitan: Clèlas) is a commune in the Isère department in southeastern France.

== Population ==
Historical population
Year	Pop.	±% p.a.
1968	328	—
1975	285	−1.99%
1982	319	+1.62%
1990	345	+0.98%
1999	378	+1.02%
2007	489	+3.27%
2012	548	+2.30%
2017	543	−0.18%
2023	596	+1.56%
Source: INSEE

== See also ==
- Communes of the Isère department
- Col de la Croix Haute
- Parc naturel régional du Vercors
