= Buëch =

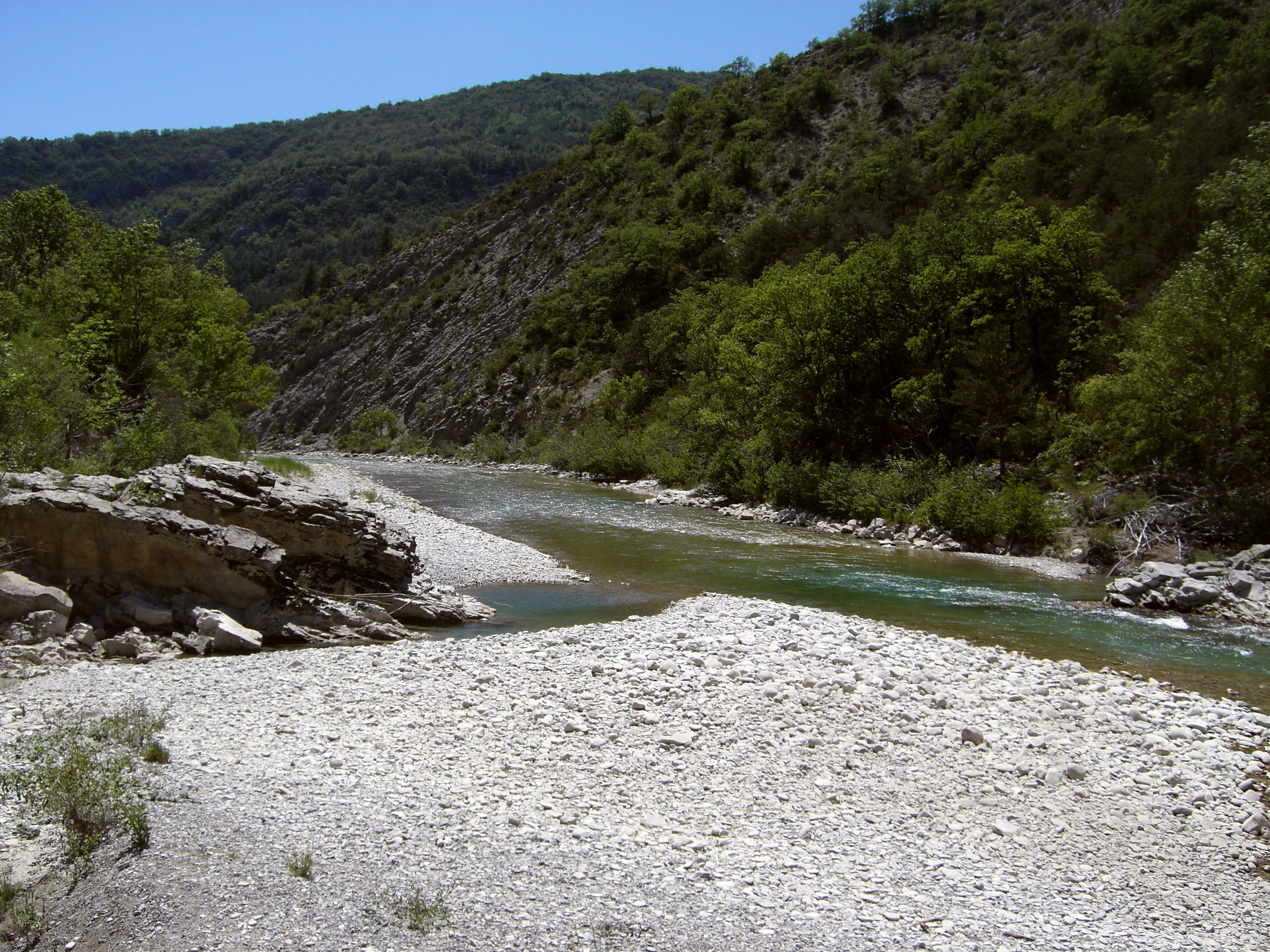
- Buëch River

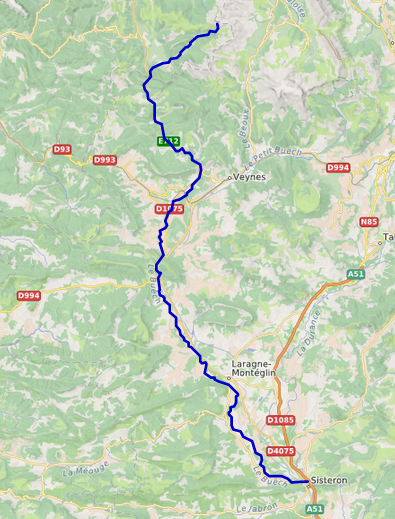

Location
- Country: France

Physical characteristics
- Source
  - location: Dauphiné Alps
- Mouth
  - location: Durance
  - coordinates: 44°12′5″N 5°56′35″E
- Length: 85 km (53 mi)
- Basin size: 1,478 km^{2} (571 mi^{2})

Basin features
- Progression: Durance→ Rhône→ Mediterranean Sea

The Buëch (French pronunciation: [bɥɛʃ]; Occitan: Bueg Occitan pronunciation: [bɥetʃ]) is a river in southeastern France, a right tributary of the Durance. It is 85.3 km (53.0 mi) long. Its drainage basin is 1,478 km^{2} (571 sq mi). Its source is in the Dauphiné Alps, near the peak of Grand Ferrand. It flows generally southward for most of its course in the Hautes-Alpes département, and flows into the Durance at Sisteron.

Départements and towns along the Buëch include:

- Drôme:
  - Lus-la-Croix-Haute
- Hautes-Alpes:
  - Aspres-sur-Buëch
  - Serres
  - Laragne-Montéglin
- Alpes-de-Haute-Provence:
  - Mison
  - Sisteron
