= Pic de Bure =

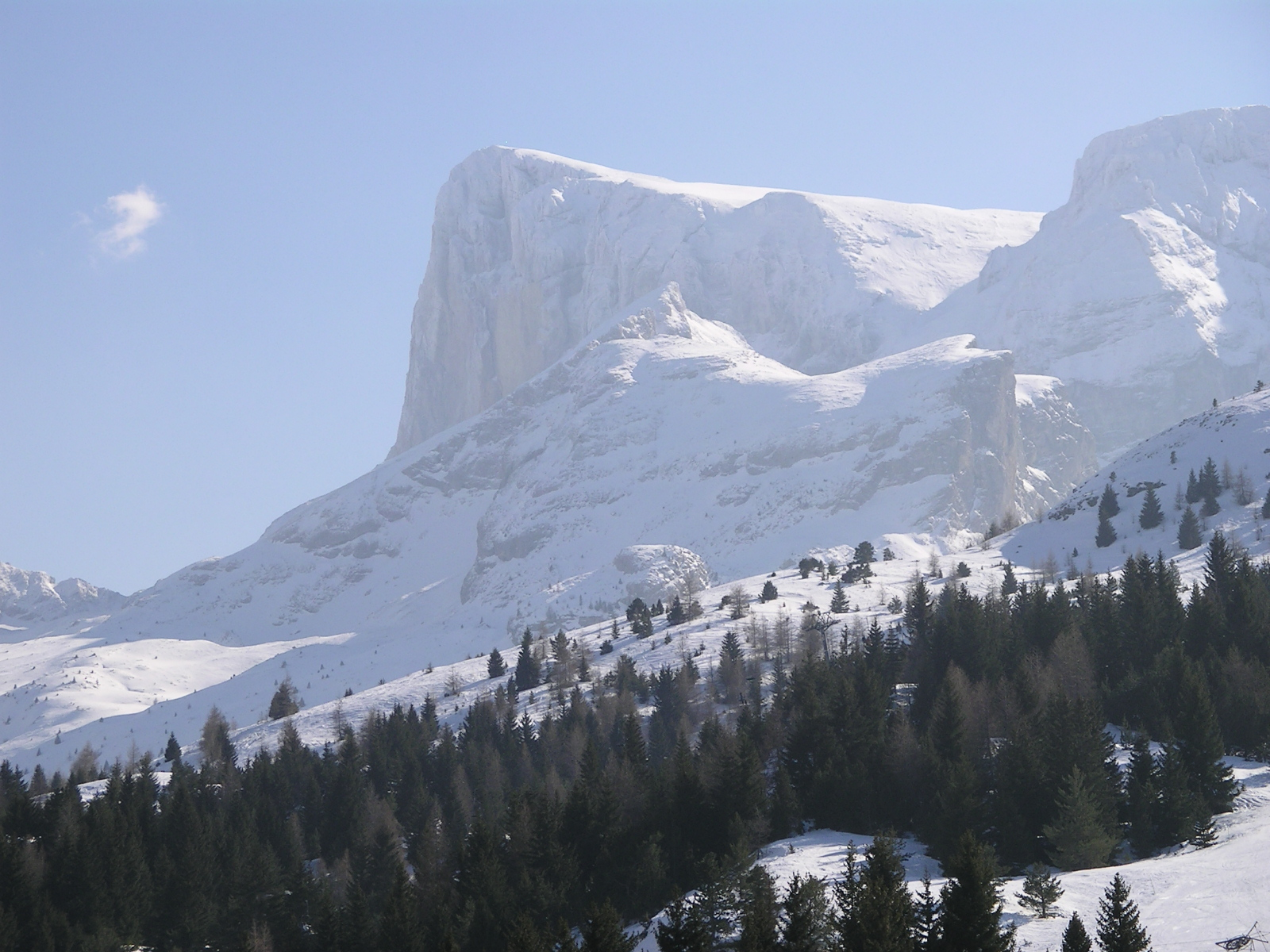
- Pic de Bure

Highest point
- Elevation: 2,709 m (8,888 ft)
- Prominence: 1,268 m (4,160 ft)
- Coordinates: 44°37′37″N 5°56′06″E

Geography
- Location within Alps
- Location: Provence-Alpes-Côte d'Azur, France
- Parent range: Dauphiné Alps

Pic de Bure is a prominent mountain of the Dauphiné Alps in France, culminating at a height of 2,709 m (8,888 ft), the third highest peak of the Dévoluy Mountains. The Plateau de Bure Interferometer is located on its slopes.
