= Lus-la-Croix-Haute =

- Commune
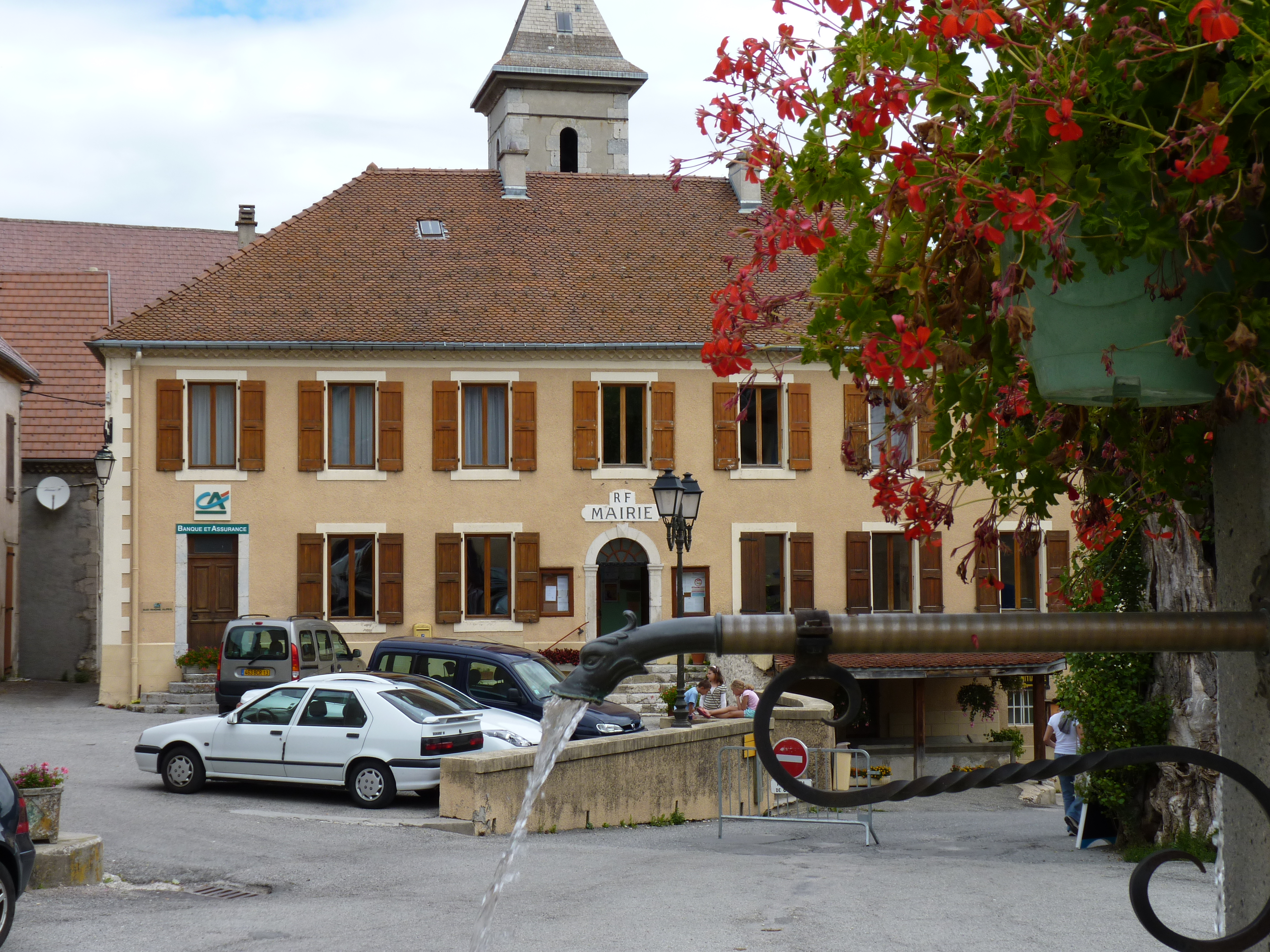
- The town hall of Lus-la-Croix-Haute
- Location of Lus-la-Croix-Haute
- Location within France Location within Auvergne-Rhône-Alpes
- Coordinates: 44°39′59″N 5°42′23″E
- Country: France
- Region: Auvergne-Rhône-Alpes
- Department: Drôme
- Arrondissement: Die
- Canton: Le Diois
- Intercommunality: Diois

Government
  - Mayor (2020–2026): Laurent Bernard
- Area^{1}: 87.20 km^{2} (33.67 sq mi)
- Elevation: 1,050 m (3,440 ft)
- Highest elevation: 2,454 m (8,051 ft)
- Lowest elevation: 971 m (3,186 ft)
- Population (2023): 523
  - Density: 6.00/km^{2} (15.5/sq mi)
- Time zone: UTC+01:00 (CET)
  - Summer (DST): UTC+02:00 (CEST)
- INSEE/Postal code: 26168 /26620
- ^{1} French Land Register data, which excludes lakes, ponds, glaciers > 1 km^{2} (0.386 sq mi or 247 acres) and river estuaries.

Lus-la-Croix-Haute (Occitan: Lutz de la Crotz Auta) is a commune in the Drôme department in southeastern France.

== Geography ==
Situated in the Dauphiné Alps, it is the highest commune in the Drôme department.

Lus-la-Croix-Haute is a very extended community in the département of Drôme, with an area of 87.2 square kilometres (33.7 mi^{2}), in the valley and area of Lus c. 1000 m mountainous environment c. 2,453 m (8,048 ft) altitude, facing towards Drôme. The community borders with the départements of Isère et the Hautes-Alpes (High-Alpes), between the massive mountains of Dévoluy in the east, the (valley) of Trièves in the north and the Diois in the west. Lus-la-Croix-Haute is centered between Clelles and Aspres-sur-Buëch. The community includes 24 areas, including La Caire, Les Corréardes, Le Trabuech, Mas Rebuffat, Mas Bourget, La Jarjatte, Les Morlières, Les Lussettes, Moulin de l'Ours, Les Fauries, and Les Miellons.

On the commune's northern border lies the mountain pass Col de la Croix Haute, through which route national 75 joins Marseille to Grenoble. This pass is a climate border between the Northern and Southern Alps. The community is also known as the source of the Buëch River, which flows in the valley of la Jarjatte through the cascades of Mougious, which is indeed the source of it in the valley of Buëch. The community has a railroad-station along the Lyon-Perrache to Marseille-Saint-Charles railroad line via Grenoble served by the TER of the connection Grenoble - Gap.

== History ==
During the 11th and 12th centuries, Lus-la-Croix Haute belonged to the lordship of Trièves, which was the property of the ancient counts of Die. The Bishops of Die played a considerable role in the region through the history. One of their principal vassals and feudal-lords was the family Odde de Bonniot, co-lords of Vercors, which originated in Lus-la-Croix-Haute and its surroundings. During the French Wars of Religion, they were displaced to the regions of Vivarais, Orange, Velay and to the Netherlands.

== Population ==
Historical population

Year	Pop.	±% p.a.
1793	1,518	—
1800	1,759	+2.13%
1806	1,564	−1.94%
1821	1,710	+0.60%
1831	1,745	+0.20%
1836	1,838	+1.04%
1841	1,637	−2.29%
1846	1,711	+0.89%
1851	1,639	−0.86%
1856	1,449	−2.43%
1861	1,556	+1.44%
1866	1,546	−0.13%
1872	1,503	−0.47%
1876	1,721	+3.44%
1881	1,550	−2.07%
1886	1,484	−0.87%
1891	1,352	−1.85%
1896	1,258	−1.43%
1901	1,174	−1.37%

Year	Pop.	±% p.a.
1906	1,137	−0.64%
1911	1,075	−1.12%
1921	931	−1.43%
1926	851	−1.78%
1931	743	−2.68%
1936	719	−0.65%
1946	705	−0.20%
1954	600	−2.00%
1962	573	−0.57%
1968	487	−2.67%
1975	479	−0.24%
1982	412	−2.13%
1990	428	+0.48%
1999	437	+0.23%
2007	489	+1.42%
2012	522	+1.31%
2017	549	+1.01%
2023	523	−0.81%

Source: EHESS and INSEE (1968–2023)

== See also ==
- Communes of the Drôme department
- Parc naturel régional du Vercors
