= Partizione delle Alpi =

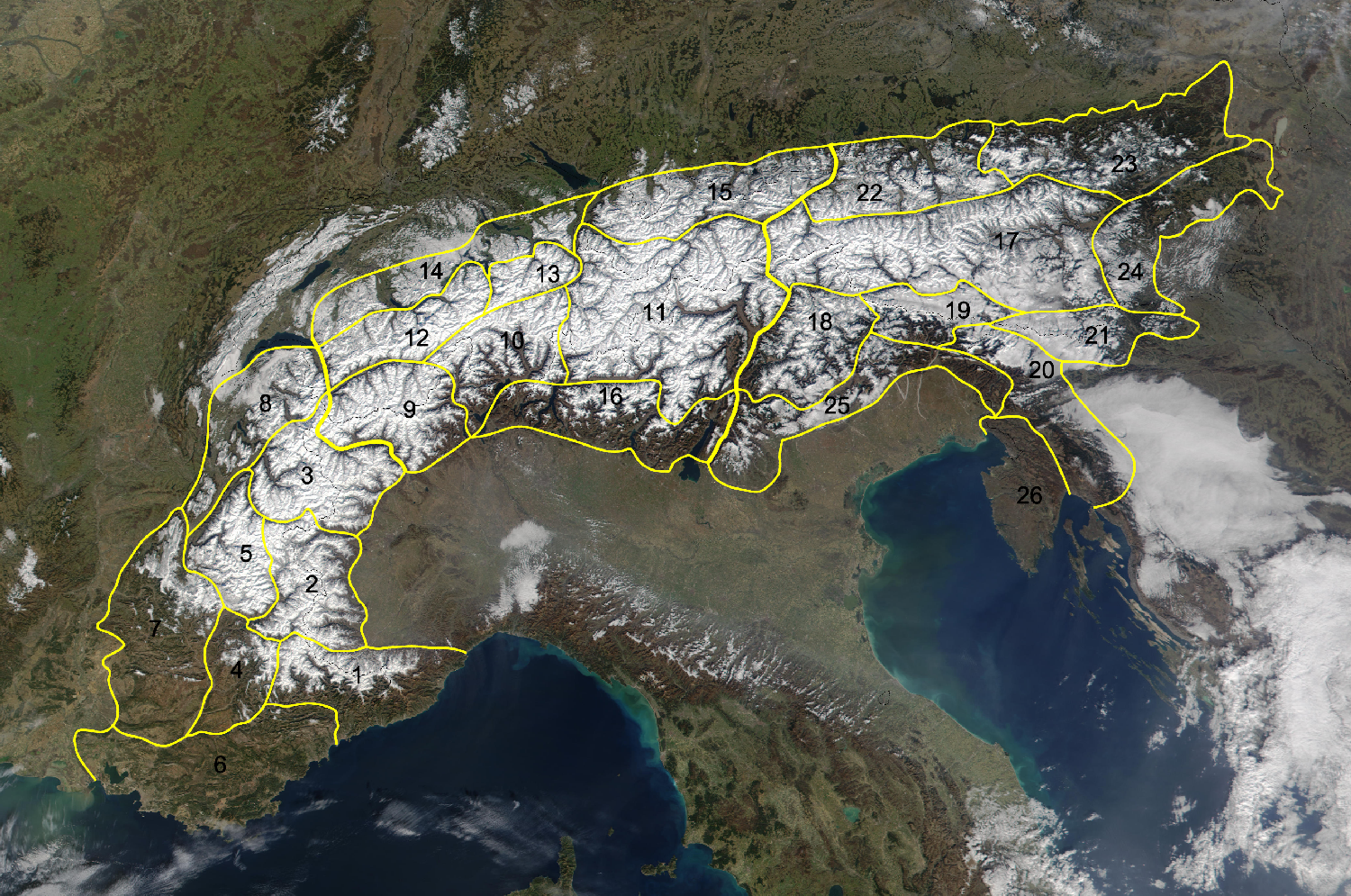
Partizione delle Alpi

The Partizione delle Alpi (Italian for "Partition of the Alps", German: Einteilung der Alpen, French: Partition des Alpes) is a classification of the mountain ranges of the Alps, that is primarily used in Italian literature, but also in France and Switzerland. It was devised in 1926.

This classification system entails a division of the main arc of the Alps into the Alpi Occidentali (Western Alps), Alpi Centrali (Central Alps) and Alpi Orientali (Eastern Alps).

== Structure ==
Mountain ranges of the Partizione delle Alpi and international borders

The basic structure is based on the three main divisions. These were further subdivided into 26 sections" and 112 "groups".

- The "Western Alps", in this classification run from the Bocchetta di Altare/Colle di Cadibona, usually accepted as the boundary between the Alps and the Apennines, to the Col Ferret (just west of the Great Saint Bernard) between the Aosta Valley and Valais (upper Rhone valley). Its highest peak is Mont Blanc (4,810 m).
  The boundary between the western and central arc of the Alps is the line Ivrea – Aosta Valley – Italian Val Ferret – Col Ferret – Swiss Val Ferret – Martigny-Ville – eastern end of Lake Geneva near Montreux/Vevey
- The "Central Alps" run from the Col Ferret to the Brenner Pass. Their highest summit is Monte Rosa (4,611 m).
  The eastern section is bounded by the line of the Adige valley – valley of the Eisack – Brenner – valley of the Sill – Innsbruck – Lower Inn Valley as far as Rosenheim
- The "Eastern Alps", run from the Brenner as far as Rijeka, including Istrien and Gorski kotar. The Großglockner (3,798 m) is the highest peak of the Eastern Alps.

The term "Central Alps" should not be confused with the Central Alps within the north-to-south division of the Eastern Alps.

== History and reception ==
This classification of the Alps was compiled in 1926 on the occasion of the IXth Congresso Geografico Italiano and published in the Nomi e limiti delle grandi parti del Sistema Alpino ("Names and Boundaries of the Major Elements of the Alpine System").

The system covered the entirety of the Alps and not just that part of the Alps that lay on Italian soil. In spite of that, the classification is focussed on Italy, because it does not employ the usual bipartite division, and in general the subdivisions usually used in other countries were ignored. It was seen as flawed because it included regions that, according to research, were not part of the Alps.

The following have been cited by Marazzi as basic shortcomings and inconsistencies:

- the inclusion of the Massif des Maures, which does not belong to the Alpine system either tectonically or geologically
- the Monts de Vaucluse, Montagne de Lure and the Luberon Massif were not counted as pre-alps of the Dauphiné in French literature, but as part of Provence, because they lay within that region. Moreover, the Provence Alps also include the "Prealps of Digne" (Préalpes de Digne), that were placed under Prealpi di Provenza (Provence Prealps, French: Préalpes de Provence)
- in the Prealpi svizzere (Swiss Prealps) more northerly regions are included that, according to Swiss geographic literature, do not belong to the Alpine region, but to the Central Plateau, as part of the northern Alpine Foreland
- the Alpi Noriche (Noric Alps) cover far too large an area in comparison with the groups given in Austrian literature (rather excessively the Tux Alps, the whole Tauern, the Alps of Styria and Carinthia are incorporated into the Noric Alps)
- the Alpi bavaresi (Bavarian Alps), the Alpi salisburghesi (Salzburg Alps) and the Alpi austriache (Austrian Alps) are based on archaic concepts, the terms are used entirely differently in the German-speaking region
- the inclusion of the Karst in a broad sense and Istria in the Alpine system, which, today, are considered part of the Dinaric Alps

More up to date versions of this system are found in standard works like the Dictionnaire encyclopédique des Alpes (2006) or Il Grande Dizionario Enciclopedico delle Alpi (2007).

== Sections and groups of the three Alpine divisions ==
No.	English name	Italian name	French / Slovenian names (Note: French names are used in the Western Alps and Western Central Alps, Slovenian in the Southern Eastern Alps.)	German name	Groups (i.e. ranges) (English names in brackets)
	Western Alps	Alpi Occidentali	Alpes orientales	Westalpen	From Colle di Cadibona to the Col Ferret
1	Maritime Alps	Alpi Marittime (e Prealpi di Nizza)	Alpes maritimes	Meeralpen, Seealpen	1a Alpi liguri/Alpes ligures (Ligurian Alps); 1b Alpi del Var; 1c Prealpi di Nizza/Préalpes de Nice, Préalpes Niçoises (Nice Prealps)
2	Cottian Alps	Alpi Cozie	Alpes cottiennes	Cottische Alpen	2a Alpi Cozie meridionali, Gruppo del Monviso (Southern Cottian Alps); 2b Alpi Cozie centrali, Alpi del Monginevro (Central Cottian Alps →Col de Montgenèvre); 2c Alpi Cozie settentrionali Catena del Cenisio/Massif du Mont-Cenis (Northern Cottian Alps)
3	Graian Alps	Alpi Graie	Alpes grées	Grajische Alpen	3a Gruppo del Gran Paradiso; 3b Alpi della Tarantasia; 3c Gruppo del Monte Bianco (Mont Blanc Group)
4	Provence Alps	Alpi di Provenza	Alpes de Provence	Provenzalische Alpen	4a Gruppo dell'Asse; 4b Gruppo della Bléone
5	Dauphiné Alps	Alpi del Delfinato	Alpes du Dauphiné	Dauphiné-Alpen, Dauphinéer Alpen	5a Gruppo del Champsaur; 5b Massiccio del Pelvoux; 5c Alpi di Moriana
6	Provence Prealps	Prealpi di Provenza	Préalpes de Provence	Provenzalische Voralpen	6a Chaînes des Plans; 6b Montagne di Sainte Victoire; 6c Catena della Sainte Baume; 6d Monti dei Maures e dell'Esterel/Massif des Maures et Esterel
7	Dauphiné Prealps	Prealpi del Delfinato	Préalpes du Dauphiné	Dauphiné-Voralpen, Dauphinéer Voralpen	7a Montagna del Luberon; 7b Montagne di Valchiusa; 7c Massiccio del Dévoluy; 7d Vercors
8	Savoy Prealps, Savoy Alps	Prealpi di Savoia, Alpi di Savoia	Préalpes de Savoie, Alpes de Savoie	Savoie-Voralpen, Savoie-Alpen, Savoier Alpen	8a Alpi dello Sciablese (Chablais Alps); 8b Catena del Reposoir; 8c Baujes; 8d Massiccio della Grande Chartreuse
	Central Alps	Alpi Centrali	Alpes centrals	Zentralalpen	From Col Ferret to the Brenner Pass
9	Pennine Alps	Alpi Pennine	Alpes pennines	Penninische Alpen	9a Alpi del Vallese (Valais Alps); 9b Gruppo della Val Sesia (Valsesia Group)
10	Lepontine Alps	Alpi Lepontine	Alpes lépontines	Lepontinische Alpen	10a Gruppo del Monte Leone (Monte Leone Group); 10b Gruppo dell'Adula (Adula Alps); 10c Alpi Ticinesi (Tessine Alps)
11	Rhaetian Alps	Alpi Retiche	Alpes rhétiques	Rätische Alpen	11a Gruppo dell'Albula e Silvretta (Albula Alps and Silvretta); 11b Gruppo della Plessur (Plessur Alps); 11c Catena del Reticone (Rätikon); 11d Gruppo del Ferwall (Verwall Alps); 11e Gruppo del Bernina (Bernina Group); 11f Gruppo dell'Umbraglio (Umbrail Group); 11g Alpi Venoste (Vintschgau Alps); 11h Alpi Breonie (roughly corresponds to the Stubai Alps); 11i Alpi Sarentine (Sarntal Alps); 11j Gruppo dell'Ortles (Ortler Alps); 11k Monti della Val di Non (Nonstal Alps, Nonsberg Alps); 11l Gruppo dell'Adamello (Adamello Group); 11m Dolomiti di Brenta (Brenta group)
12	Bernese Alps	Alpi bernesi	Alpes bernoises	Berner Alpen	12a Massiccio del Finsteraarhorn (Finsteraarhorn Massif); 12b Gruppo del Wildhorn (Wildhorn Group); 12c Alpi Urane (Uri Alps)
13	Glarus Alps	Alpi Glaronesi	Alpes glaronaises	Glarner Alpen	13a Gruppo del Tödi (Tödi Group); 13b Gruppo della Sardona (Surenstock)
14	Swiss Prealps	Prealpi Svizzere	Préalpes Suisses	Schweizer Voralpen	14a Prealpi della Simmental (Simmental Alps); 14b Prealpi dell'Emmental (Emmental Alps); 14c Prealpi della Linth (Linth Alps)
15	Bavarian Alps	Alpi Bavaresi	–	Bayrische Alpen	15a Alpi dell'Algovia (Allgäu Alps); 15b Alpi della Lechtal (Lechtal Alps); 15c Monti dell'Achensee (Achensee Mountains)
16	Lombard Prealps	Prealpi Lombarde	–	Lombardische Voralpen, Lombardische Alpen	16a Prealpi Luganesi (Lugano Prealps); 16b Alpi Orobie (Orobian Alps); 16c Prealpi Bergamasche (Bergamasque Alps); 16d Prealpi Bresciane (Brescene Alps); 16e Prealpi Giudicarie; 16f Gruppo del Monte Baldo
	Eastern Alps	Alpi Orientali	Alpes orientales	Ostalpen	From Brenner to Rijeka
17	Noric Alps	Alpi Noriche	–	Norische Alpen	17a Prealpi del Tux (Tux Alps); 17b Alpi della Zillertal (Zillertal Alps); 17c Alti Tauri (High Tauern); 17d Bassi Tauri (Low Tauern); 17b Alpi Carinziane (Carinthian Alps)
18	Dolomites	Dolomiti	–	Dolomiten	18a Alpi di Gardena e Fassa; 18b Gruppo della Marmolada; 18c Alpi di Ampezzo e Cadore; 18d Alpi della Valsugana e di Primiero
19	Carnic Alps	Alpi Carniche	Karnijske Alpe	Karnische Alpen	19a Alpi della Gail (Gailtal Alps); 19b Alpi di Tolmezzo
20	Julian Alps	Alpi Giulie	Julijske Alpe	Julische Alpen	20a Alpi Giulie settentrionali (Northern Julian Alps); 20b Alto Carso (High Karst); 20c Carso Corniolino (Krain Karst)
21	Kamnik-Savinja Alps	Alpi di Kamnik e della Savinja	Kamniško-Savinjske Alpe	Steiner Alpen	21a Kamniške Alpe (Kamnik Alps) 21b Savinjske Alpe (Savinja Alps)
22	Karawanks	Caravanche	Karavanke	Karawanken	22a Catena delle Caravanche (Karawanks chain); 22b Monti di Bacher (Bacher Mountains/Kamnic Alps)
23	Salzburg Alps	Alpi Salisburghesi, Alpi di Salisburgo	–	Salzburger Alpen	23a Alpi di Kitzbühel (Kitzbühel Alps); 23b Monti Steinernes Meer (Note: Monti Steinernes Meer means the entire Berchtesgaden Alps, not just the Steinernes Meer); 23c Monti del Kaiser (Kaiser Mountains); 23d Monti dello Stein (Lofer and Leogang Mountains); 23e Monti di Tennen (Tennen Mountains); 23f Monti del Dachstein (Dachstein Group)
24	Austrian Alps	Alpi Austriache, Prealpi Austriache	–	Österreichische Alpen	24a Monti Totes (Totes Gebirge); 24b Gruppo del Pyhrgas (Phyrgas Group); 24c Monti di Sengsen (Sengsen Mountains); 24d Alpi di Ennstal (Ennstal Alps); 24e Gruppo dello Hochschwab (Hochschwab Group); 24f Alpi di Rax (Raxalpe); 24g Gruppo dello Schneeberg (Schneeberg Group); 24h Prealpi dell'Ötscher (Ötsch Prealps); 24i Selva Viennese (Vienna Woods)
25	Styrian Alps	Prealpi di Stiria	–	Steirische Alpen, Steirische Voralpen	25a Alpi di Stub (Stubalpe); 25b Alpi di Glein (Gleinalpe); 25c Alpi di Hoch (Hochalpe); 25d Alpi di Kor (Koralpe); 25e Monti di Windische Bühel; 25f Monti Stiriani (Styrian Prealps); 25g Monti di Bucklige Welt; 25b Monti di Rosalia (Rosalian Mountains)
26	Venetian Alps	Prealpi Trivenete	Venetske Alpe	Venetische Alpen, Venetische Voralpen	26a Monti Lessini (Lessine Alps); 26b Altopiano di Asiago; 26c Monte Grappa; 26d Prealpi Bellunesi (Bellunese Prealps); 26e Prealpi Carniche (Carnic Prealps); 26f Prealpi Giulie (Julian Prealps)
27	Karst	Carso	Kras	Karst	27a Piccolo Carso (Little Karst); 27b Carso istriano (Istrian Karst)

== See also ==
- Alpine Club classification of the Eastern Alps, Moriggl, 1924, 1984 revision.
- SOIUSA, an unofficial Italian proposal from 2005

== Literature ==
- Comitato Geografico Nazionale Italiano (ed.): Nomi e limiti delle grandi parti del Sistema alpino. In L'Universo. Anno Vili, no. 9, Florence, 1926.
- G. Bertoglio, G. De Simoni: Partizione delle Alpi (in 220 gruppi). Tipografia Alzani, Pinerolo, 1980.
- AA. VV.: Guida dei monti d'Italia. 60 vols., TCI-CAI, Milan, 1936–97.
