= Western Alps =

Western part of the Alps mountain range

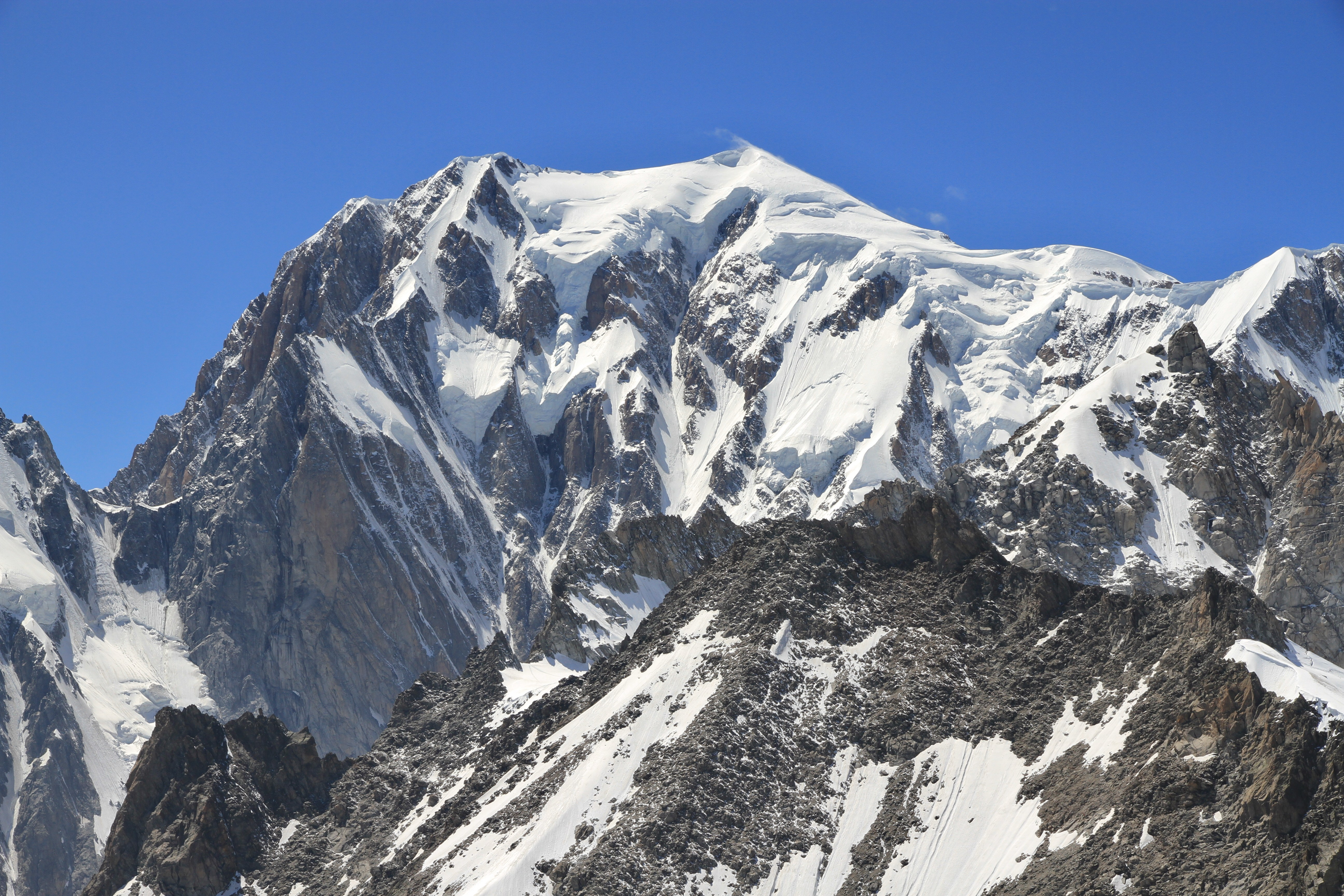
- Mont Blanc, the highest summit of the Western Alps, as seen from Aosta Valley, Italy

Highest point
- Peak: Mont Blanc
- Elevation: 4,810 m (15,780 ft)
- Coordinates: 45°50′01″N 06°51′54″E

Dimensions
- Length: 300 km (190 mi)
- Width: 150 to 185 km (93 to 115 mi)

Naming
- Native name: Alpes occidentales (French); Alpi occidentali (Italian); Westalpen (German)

Geography
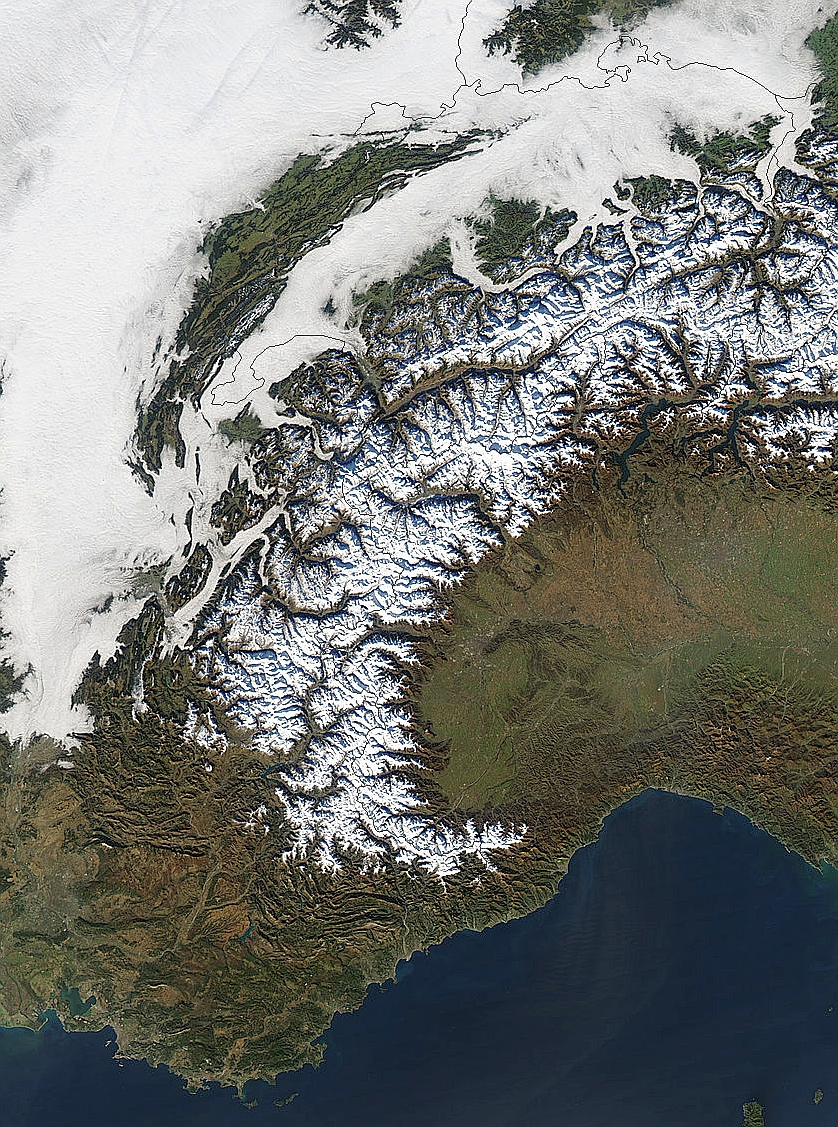
- The Western Alps from space
- Countries: Monaco, France, Italy and Switzerland
- Parent range: Alps
- Borders on: Apennines, Rhone Valley, Jura mountains, Eastern Alps, Po plain and Ligurian sea

Geology
- Orogeny: Alpine orogeny

The Western Alps are the western part of the Alpine Range including the southeastern part of France (e.g. Savoie), the whole of Monaco, the northwestern part of Italy (i.e. Piedmont and the Aosta Valley) and the southwestern part of Switzerland (e.g. Valais). In the southeast the range is bounded by the Italian Padan Plain. In the west, the valley of the Rhone river separates it from the Massif Central. The northernmost part of the Western Alps - in the wide meaning of the term - is formed by the Swiss Prealps Sub-Range.

The peaks and mountain passes are higher compared to the Eastern Alps, while the range itself is not so broad and more arched.

== Partizione delle Alpi ==
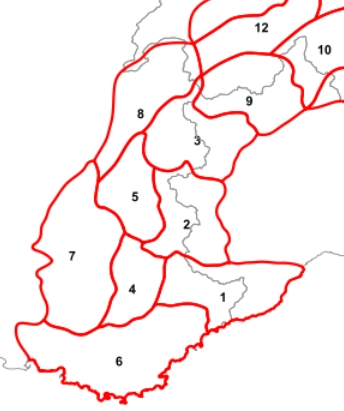
The eight Western Alps sections (1–8) according to the Partizione delle Alpi

In the Partizione delle Alpi (in English literally Partition of the Alps), adopted by the Italian Comitato Geografico Nazionale (National Geographic Committee) in 1926 following the IX Congresso Geografico Italiano (Italian Geographic Congress), the Alpine Range is divided into three main parts: Western, Central and Eastern Alps.

In this traditional subdivision, the Western Alps start from the Bocchetta di Altare (or Colle di Cadibona) and end with the Col Ferret.

The Partizione delle Alpi divides the Western Alps into the following eight sections (in brackets the section number):

Maritime Alps (1), Cottian Alps (2), Graian Alps (3), Provence Alps (4), Dauphiné Alps (5), Provence Prealps (6), Dauphiné Prealps (7) and Savoy Prealps (8).

== See also ==
- Central Eastern Alps
- Eastern Alps
- Geography of the Alps

== Maps ==
- Italian official cartography (Istituto Geografico Militare - IGM); on-line version: www.pcn.minambiente.it
- French official cartography (Institut Géographique National - IGN); on-line version: www.geoportail.fr
- Swiss official cartography (Swiss Federal Office of Topography - Swisstopo); on-line version: map.geo.admin.ch
