= Alpine foothills =

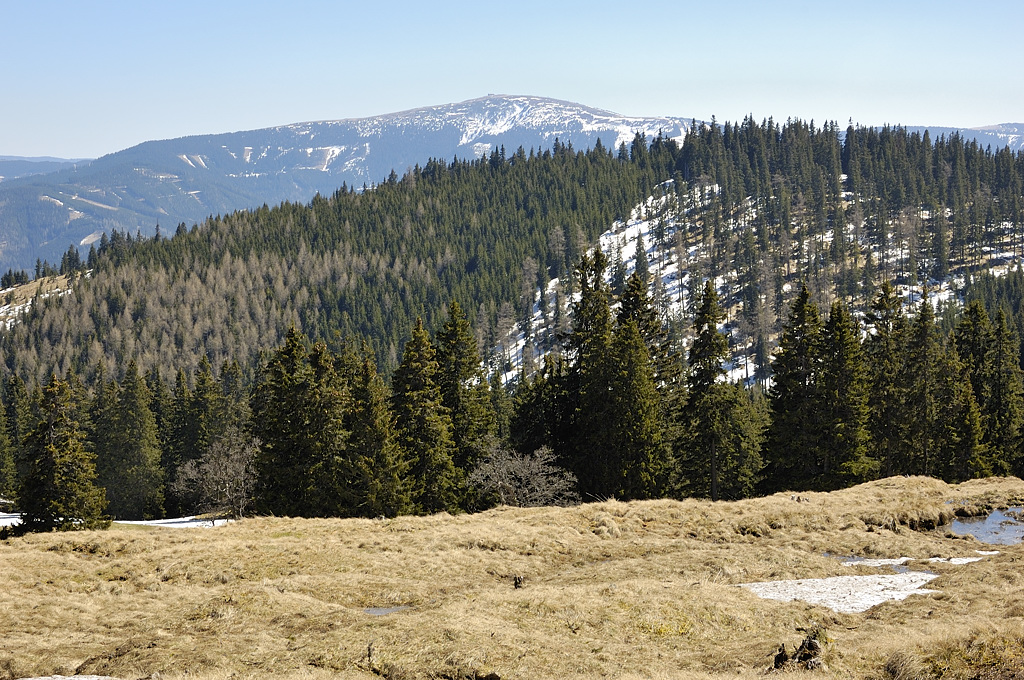
Kampalpe and Stuhleck, the highest mountain of the Prealps East of the Mur.

The Alpine foothills, or Prealps (German: Voralpen; French: Préalpes; Italian: Prealpi; Slovene: Predalpe), may refer generally to any foothills at the base of the Alps in Europe. They are the transition zone between the High Alps and the Swiss Plateau and the Bavarian Alpine Foreland in the north, as well as to the Pannonian Basin (Alpokalja) in the east, the Padan Plain in the south and the Rhone Valley in the west.

== Classification ==
The Alpine foothills comprise:

- The French Prealps
  - Savoy Prealps
  - Dauphiné Prealps
  - Provence Prealps
- The Swiss Prealps
- The Northern Prealps, part of the Northern Limestone Alps:
  - Bavarian Prealps in southeastern Germany
  - Salzburg Prealps, part of the Salzkammergut Mountains in Austria
  - Upper Austrian Prealps
  - Lower Austrian Prealps, leading to the Vienna Woods
- The Southeastern Prealps, borderline of the Alps to the Pannonian Basin in Austria and Slovenia:
  - Prealps East of the Mur
  - Lavanttal Alps
  - Styrian Prealps
  - Slovenian Prealps, Pohorje
- The Southern or Italian Prealps, usually divided into:
  - Julian Prealps
  - Venetian Prealps
  - Bergamasque Prealps
  - Lugano Prealps
  - Brescia and Garda Prealps

== Gallery ==
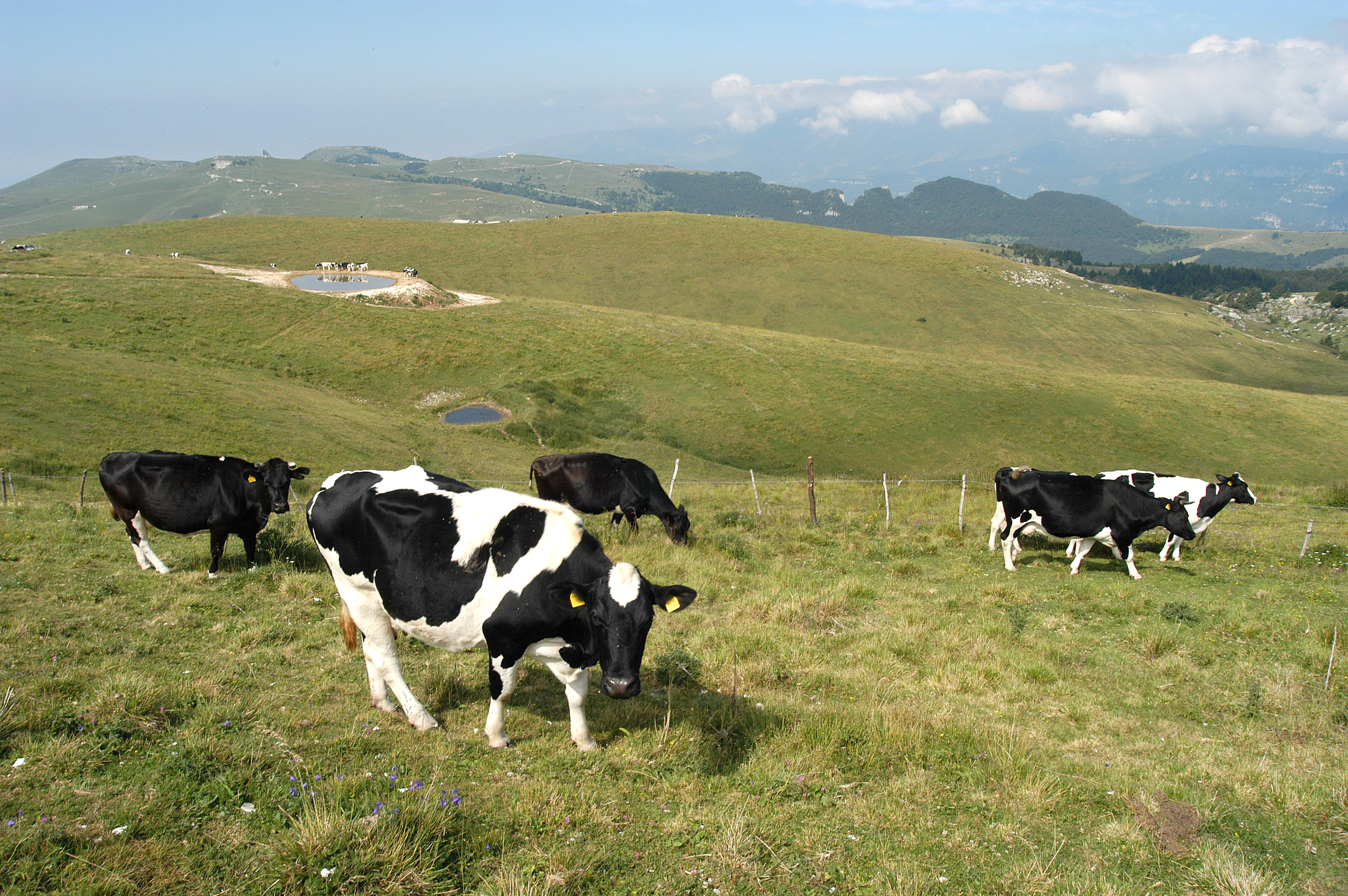
Pastures on the Lessini Mountains, in the Venetian Prealps

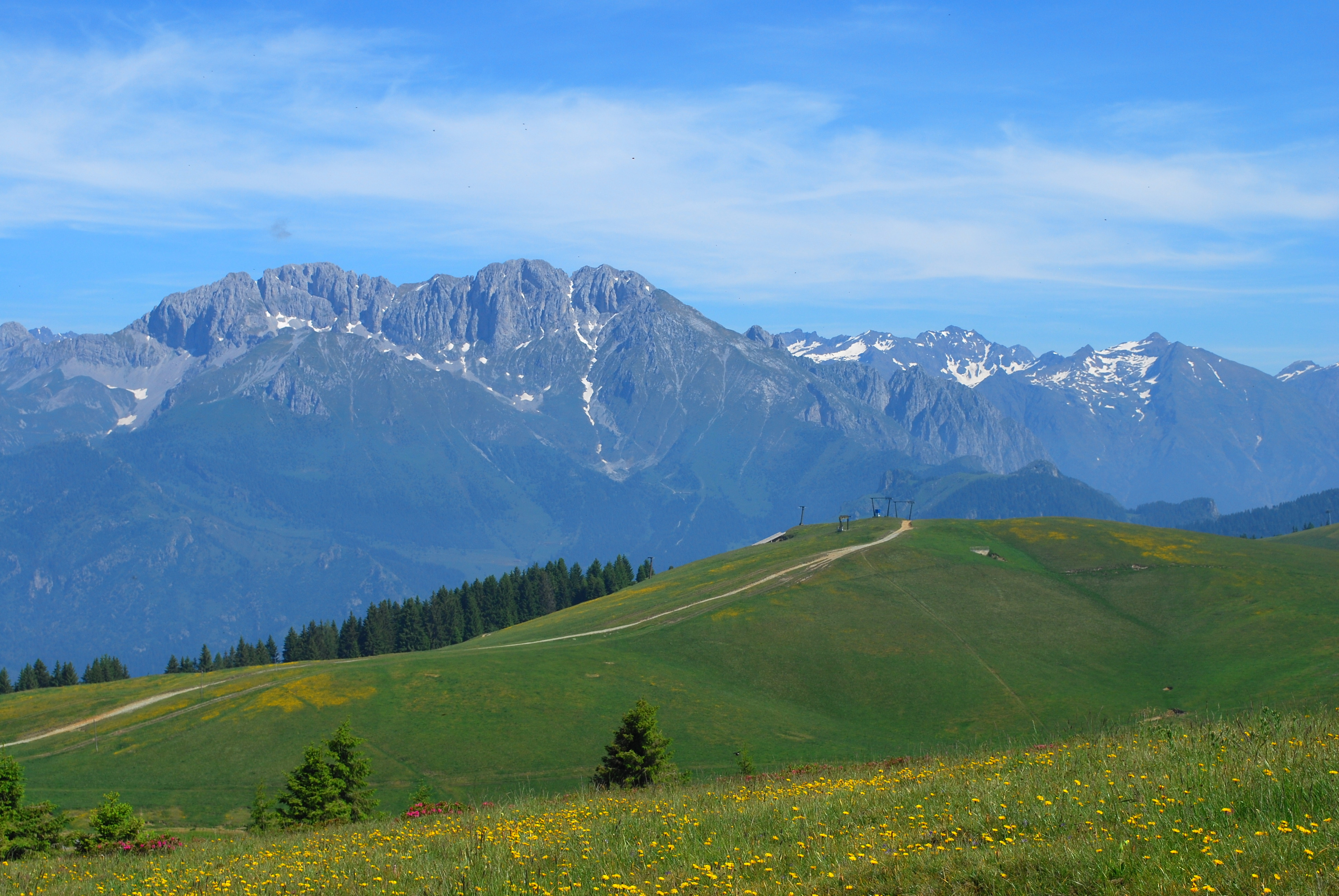
Pastures on Monte Pora with a view of Presolana, in the Bergamasque Prealps

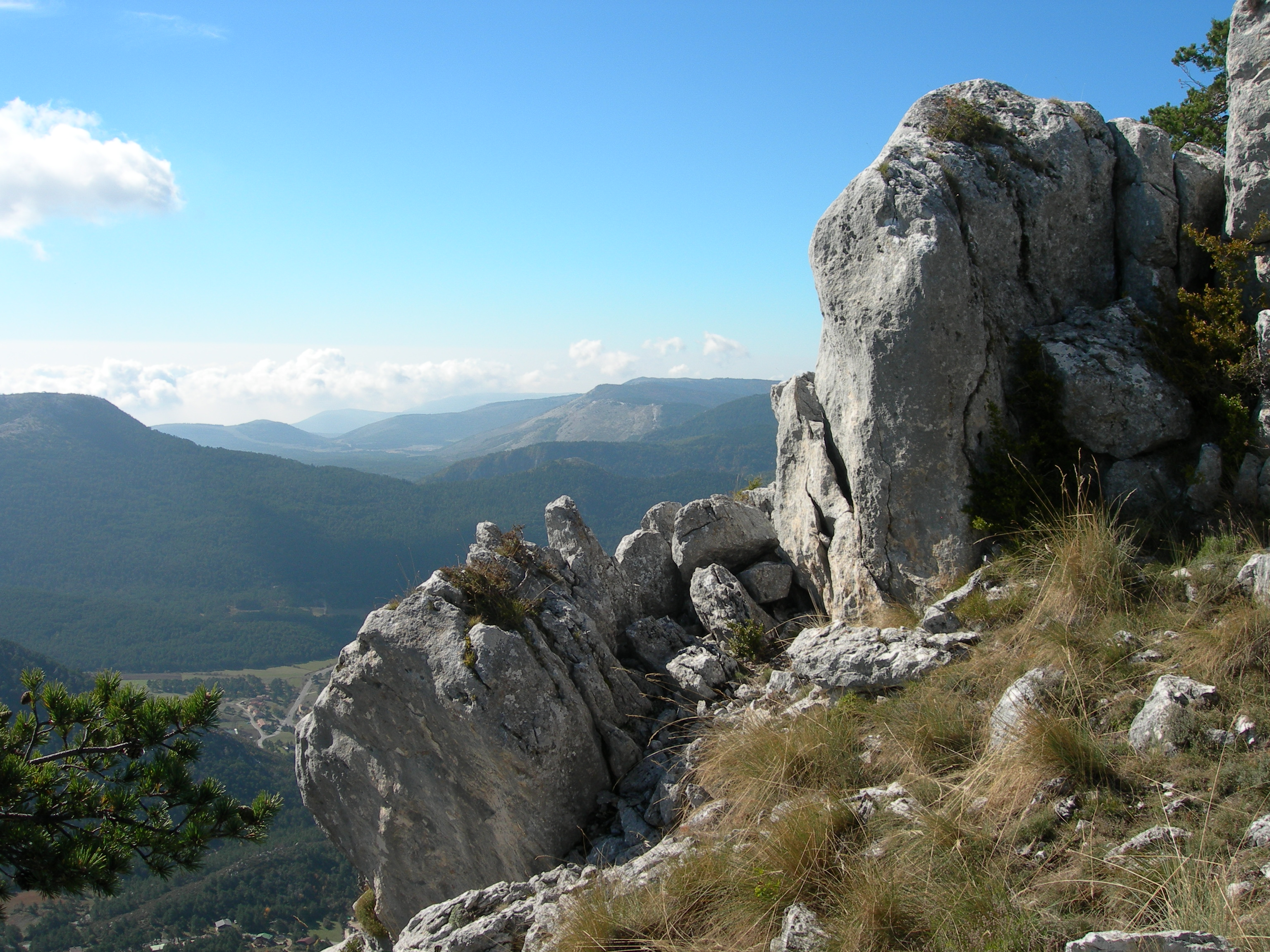
Panorama from Mount Bauroux, in the Provence Prealpes

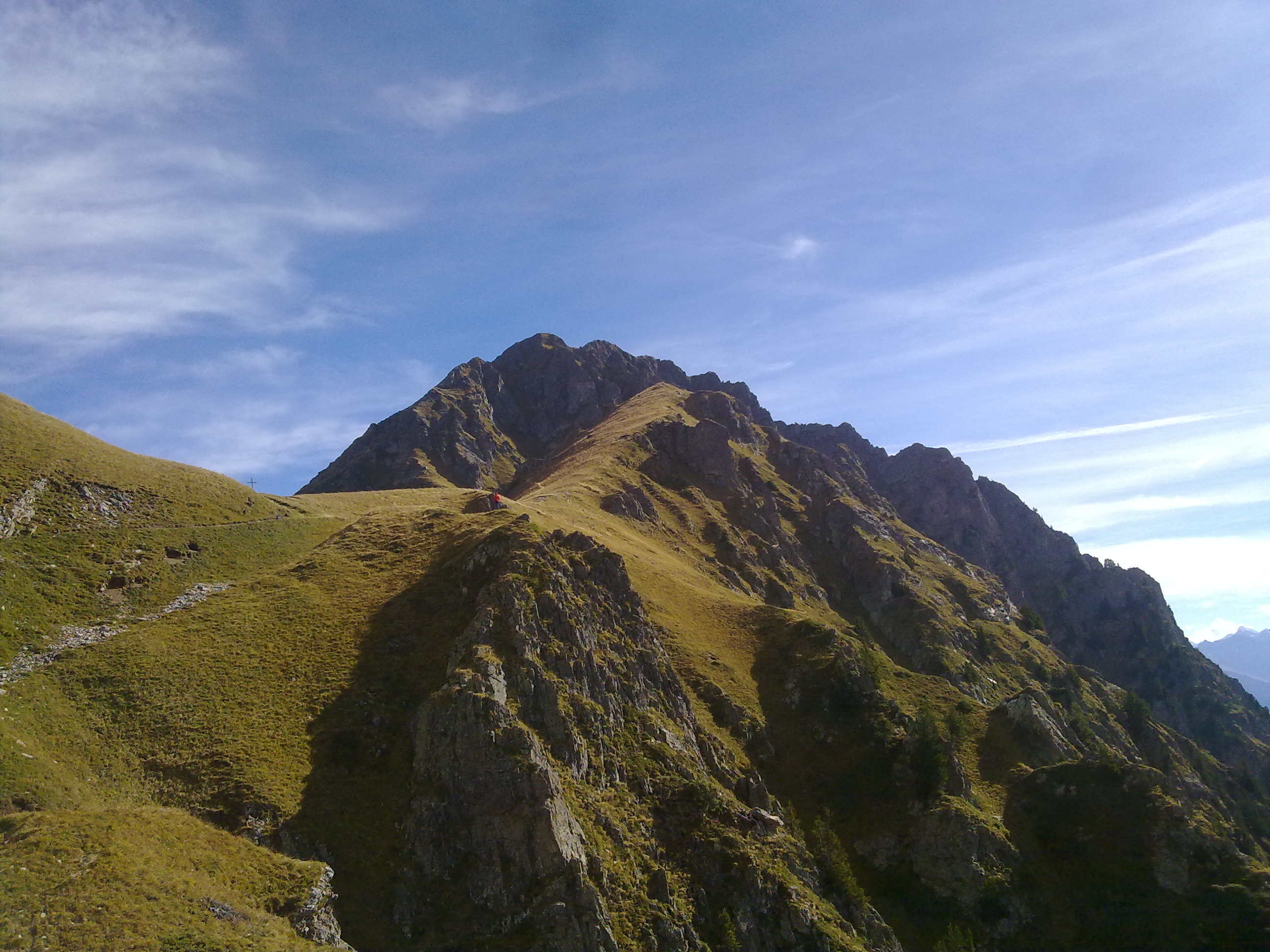
Summit of the Dent du Salantin, in the Savoy Prealps

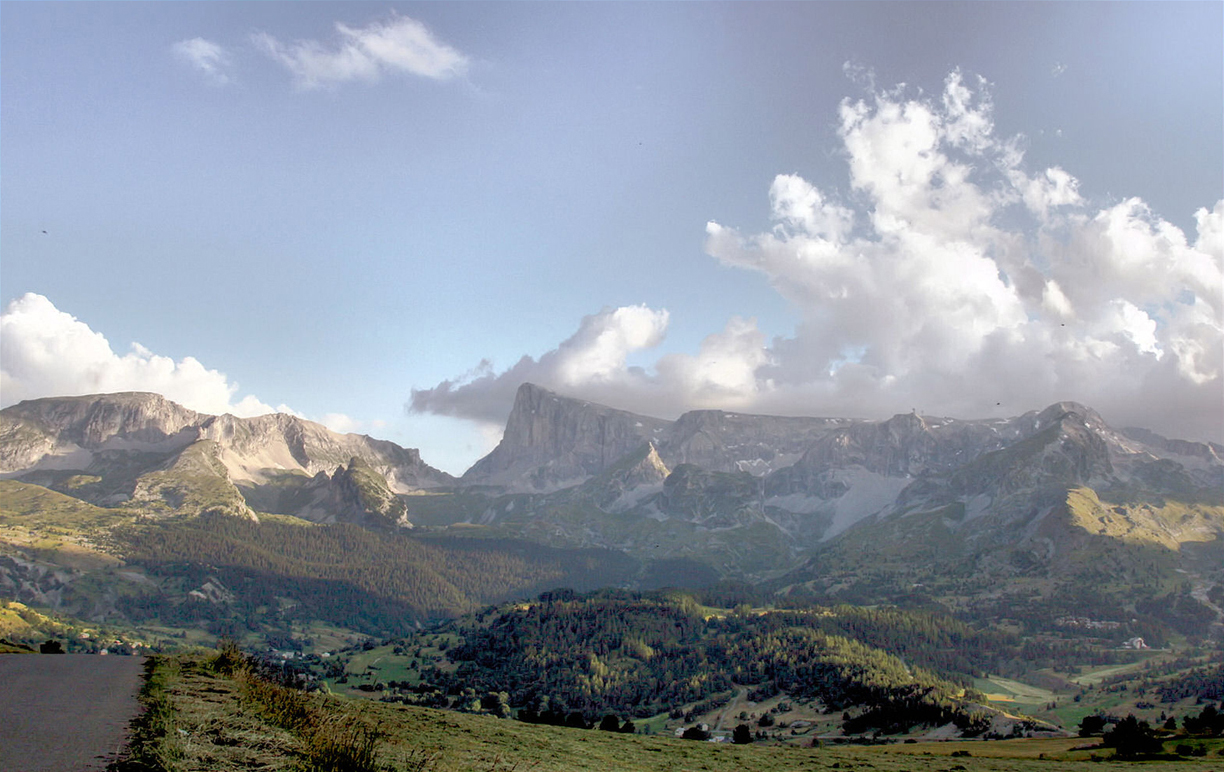
Landscape of Devoluy, in the Dauphiné Prealps

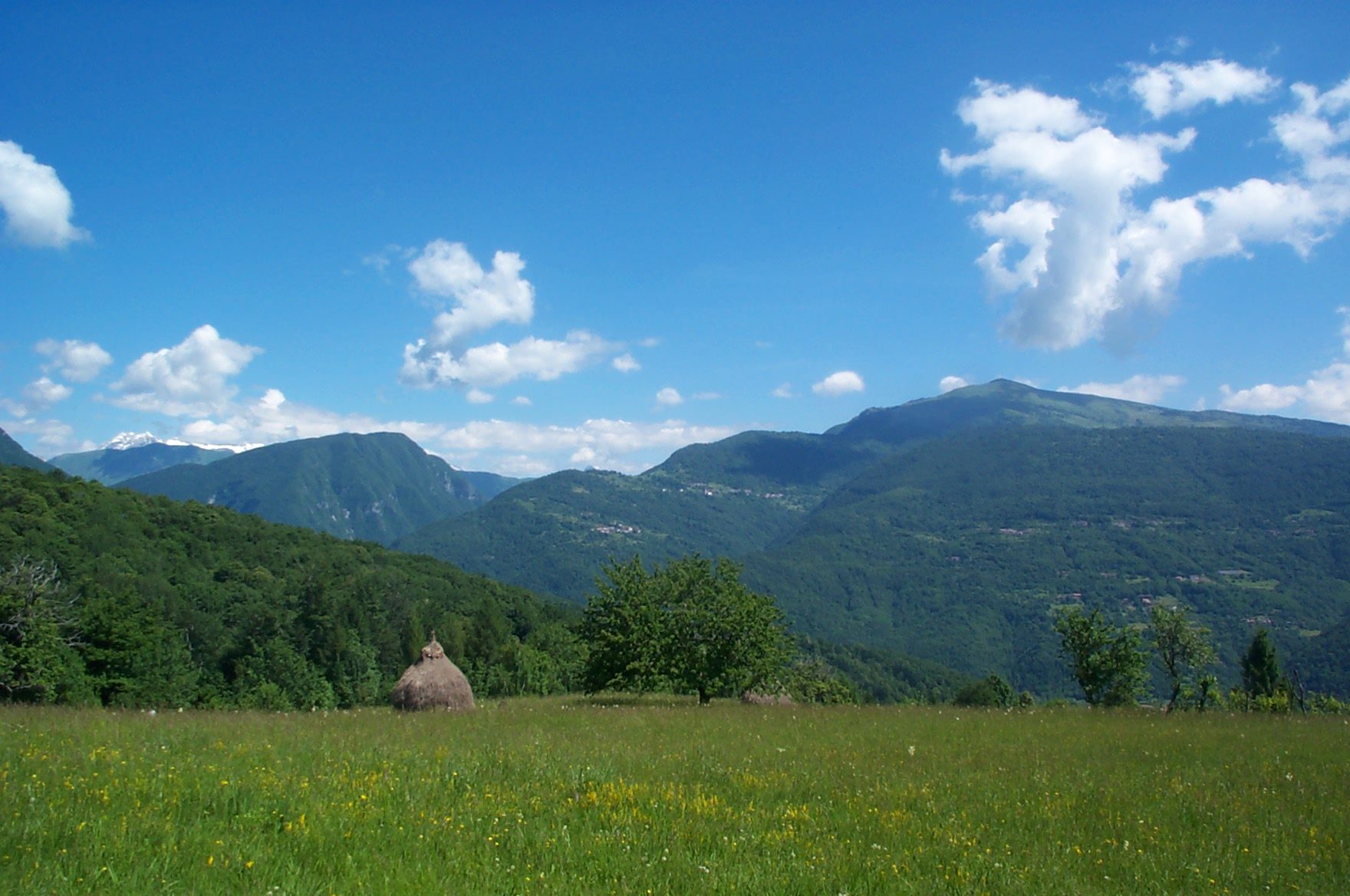
Panorama of the Mia and Matajur mountains, in the Julian Prealps

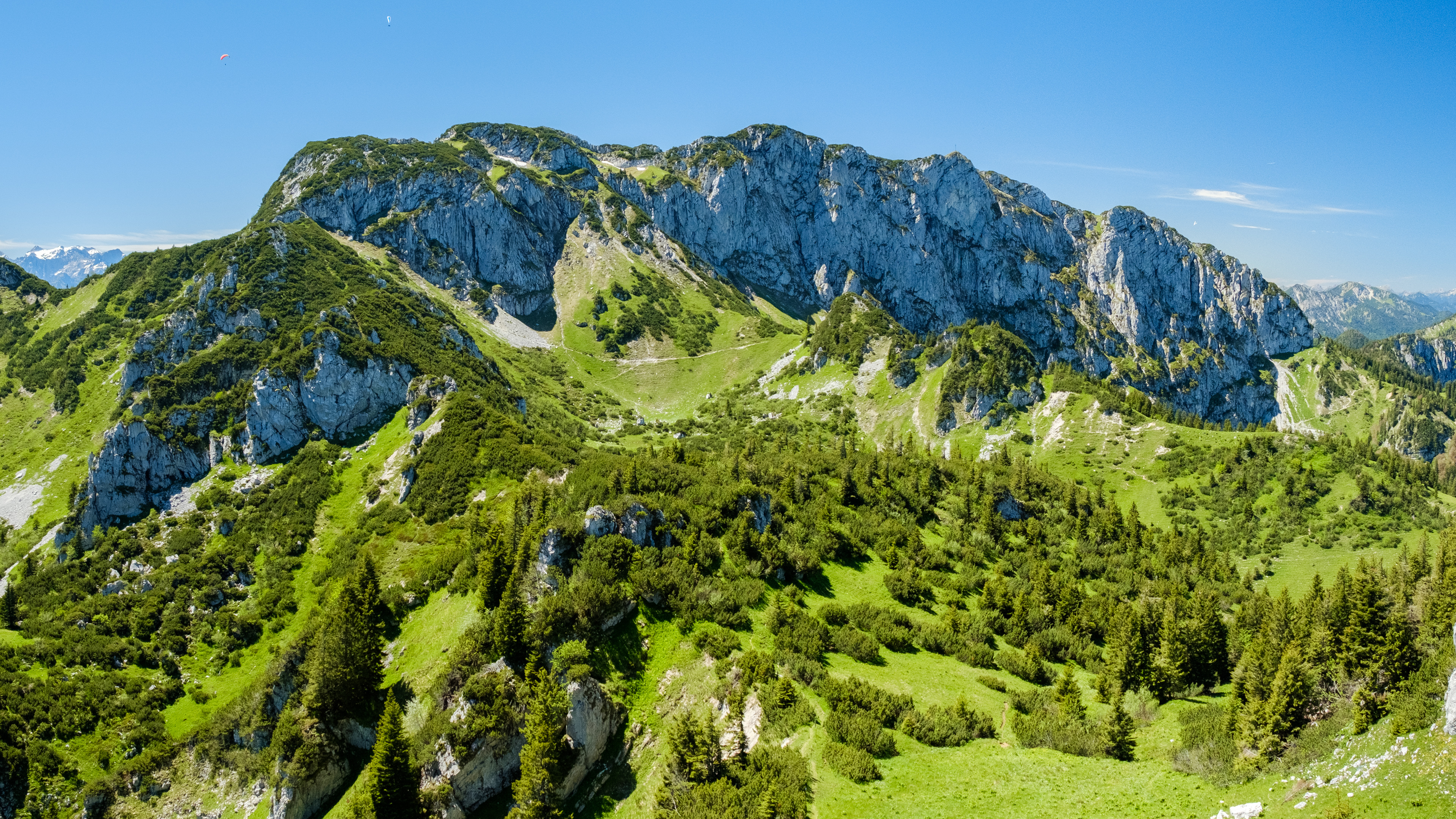
The north face of the Benediktenwand, Bavarian Prealps

== See also ==
- Operation Zone of the Alpine Foothills – a territory in Italy occupied by Nazi Germany in World War II
- Voralpen Express – Named passenger service in Switzerland (lit. 'Prealps Express')
