= Castellane Prealps =

Mountain range in the French Prealps

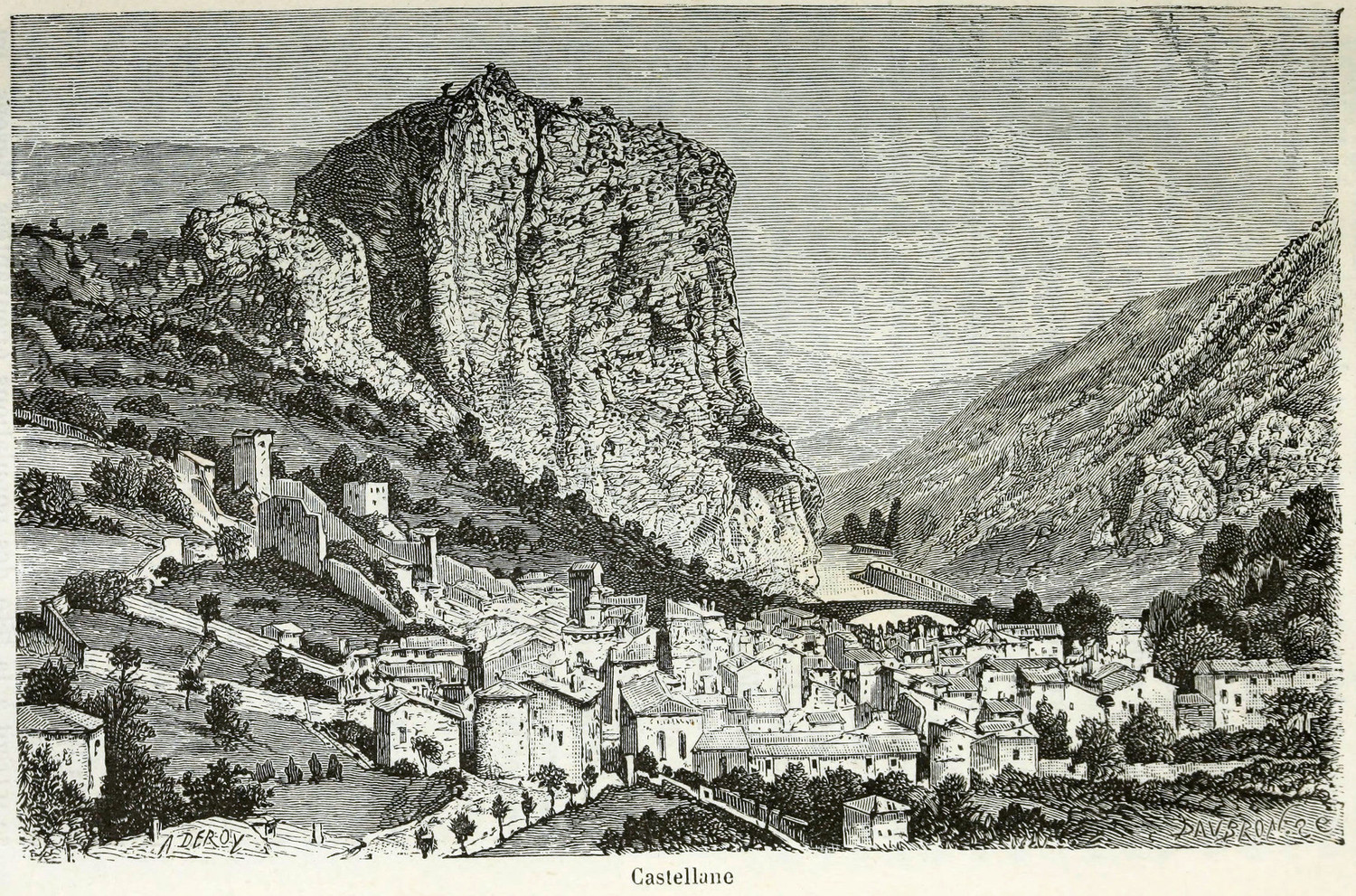
- The Prealps behind the commune of Castellane

Highest point
- Elevation: 1,996 m (6,549 ft)
- Parent peak: Puy de Rent

Naming
- Native name: Préalpes de Castellane (French)

Geography
- Country: France
- Department: Alpes-Maritimes; Alpes-de-Haute-Provence; Var
- Region: Provence-Alpes-Côte d'Azur
- Parent range: Provence Prealps

Geology
- Rock age: Late Cretaceous

The Castellane Prealps (French: Préalpes de Castellane; Occitan: Prealps Castellanes) are a massif of the southern French Prealps located in the departments of Alpes-Maritimes, Alpes-de-Haute-Provence and Var. The easternmost part is often called the Préalpes de Grasse.

== Geography ==
=== Location ===
The massif extends from west to east, south and east of Castellane to the north of Grasse and Vence, as well as south of the Verdon river and south and west of the Var river. It is located to the south of the Digne Prealps, the Trois-Évêchés massif, the Pelat Massif and the Mercantour-Argentera massif, as well as to the west of the Nice Prealps.

=== Main summits ===
- Puy de Rent, 1,996 m
- Pic de Rent, 1,974 m
- Summit of La Bernarde, 1,941 m
- Teillon mountain, 1,893 m
- Pic de Chamatte, 1,878 m
- Cheiron Mountain, 1,778 m
- Crête des Serres, 1,777 m
- Summit of Cremon, 1,760 m
- Lachens mountain, 1,712 m
- Arpille, 1,686 m
- Thorenc mountain (Pic de l'Aigle), 1,644 m
- Bauroux, 1,644 m
- Audibergue mountain (Signal d’Andon), 1,642 m
- Haut Montet, 1,335 m
- Puy de Tourettes, 1,268 m
- Pic des Courmettes, 1,248 m
- Puy de Naouri, 1,024 m
- Les Cuguyons, 982 m
- Baou de Saint-Jeannet, 802 m

== Geology ==
These prealps are made up of clayey limestone (molasse), with karst rock on the high altitude plateaus.

The mountains show limestone and dolomitic formations of Jurassic age affected by folding and thrusting with an east-west orientation. Surface formations, like sharp scree at the foot of the cliff and colluvium formations in the valleys, cover large areas.

The high altitude plateaus have a gentle topography and the characteristic features of a limestone landscape attesting to very developed karstification: lapiaz, sinkholes, dry valleys, temporary flow losses and caves.

The massif was formed in the Late Cretaceous era. During this period, the African plate and the Eurasian plate collided and caused the rim of the Alps and the formation of the Mediterranean Sea. All the sedimentary layers which were deposited above the gypsum will detach, slide, break, become entangled which defines secondary terrain on tertiary. The movement of the plates continues but since the sedimentary soil is karstic, it erodes more quickly than the crystalline rock of the old Precambrian massifs such as Estérel and Maures.
