= French Prealps =

Group of subalpine mountain ranges in southeastern France

- Prealps
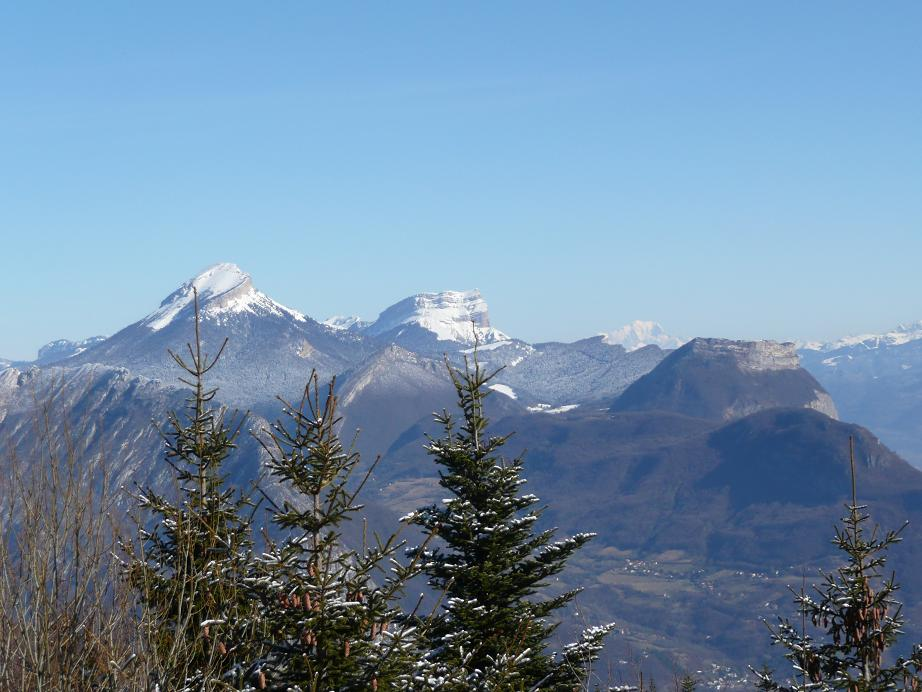
- Summits in the Chartreuse Mountains, part of the French Prealps

Highest point
- Peak: Haute Cime
- Elevation: 10,686 ft (3,257 m)

Geography
- Ranges of the French Alps, with the Prealps ranges highlighted in orange
- Country: France
- Regions: Rhône-Alpes; Provence-Alpes-Côte d'Azur
- Range coordinates: 43°59′N 6°6.65′E
- Parent range: Alps

Geology
- Orogeny: Alpine orogeny
- Rock ages: Mesozoic; Tertiary
- Rock types: Sedimentary; Flysch

The French Prealps (French: Préalpes françaises [pʁealp fʁɑ̃sɛːz]) are a group of subalpine mountain ranges of medium elevation located immediately west of the French Alps. They roughly stretch from Lake Geneva southwest to the rivers Isère and Drôme; east to a line running from Chamonix, to Albertville, to Grenoble, to Gap, to Barcelonette; and south from Grasse to Vence.

In the northern subalpine regions, the various ranges are easily identifiable by geographical separations, such as the Voreppe Gorge between Vercors and Chartreuse, or Chambéry, which sits in a valley between the Bauges and Chartreuse ranges. In the southern subalpine regions, the ranges are generally disorganized and lack the wide, deep valleys that divide them in the north.

Three non-contiguous ranges traditionally comprise the southern French Prealps: the Alpilles, Mont Sainte-Victoire and Sainte-Baume.

== Ranges and peaks ==
Chain	Range	Highest summit	Elevation (m/ft)	Comments
Savoy Prealps	Haut-Giffre Massif	Dents du Midi, Haute Cime	3,257 metres (10,686 ft)	Highest summit in the French Prealps
Savoy Prealps	Aiguilles Rouges	Aiguille du Belvédère	2,965 metres (9,728 ft)	
Savoy Prealps	Chablais Alps	Hauts-Forts	2,464 metres (8,084 ft)	Peak on French side of the range
Savoy Prealps	Bornes	Pointe Blanche	2,438 metres (7,999 ft)	
Savoy Prealps	Aravis Range	Pointe Percée	2,750 metres (9,022 ft)	
Savoy Prealps	Bauges	Arcalod	2,217 metres (7,274 ft)	
Savoy Prealps	Chartreuse Mountains	Chamechaude	2,082 metres (6,831 ft)	
Dauphiné Prealps	Vercors Plateau	Grand Veymont	2,341 metres (7,680 ft)	also called the French Dolomites
Dauphiné Prealps	Diois Mountains	Mont Jocou	2,051 metres (6,729 ft)	
Provence Prealps	Baronnies	Mont Mare	1,603 metres (5,259 ft)	
Dauphiné Prealps	Dévoluy Mountains	Grande Tête de l'Obiou	2,789 metres (9,150 ft)	
Dauphiné Prealps	Bochaine	Mont Céüse	2,016 metres (6,614 ft)	also called the Pays du Buëch
Provence Prealps	Massif des Trois-Évêchés	Tête de l'Estrop	2,961 metres (9,715 ft)	
Provence Prealps	Digne Prealps	Les Monges	2,115 metres (6,939 ft)	
Provence Prealps	Vaucluse Mountains	Signal de Saint-Pierre	1,256 metres (4,121 ft)	
Provence Prealps	Luberon Mountains	Mourre Nègre	1,125 metres (3,691 ft)	
Provence Prealps	Castellane Prealps	Puy de Rent	1,996 metres (6,549 ft)	also called the Grasse Prealps
Maritime Prealps	Nice Prealps	Pointe des Trois Communes	2,080 metres (6,824 ft)	Highest point on the Authion Massif
Non-contiguous	Alpilles	Tour des Opies	498 metres (1,634 ft)	Traditional southern range
Non-contiguous	Mont Sainte-Victoire	Pic des Mouches	1,011 metres (3,317 ft)	Traditional southern range
Non-contiguous	Sainte-Baume	Joug de l'Aigle	1,148 metres (3,766 ft)	Traditional southern range

Among the best known peaks in the French Prealps are:

- Mont Ventoux, near Carpentras, Vaucluse, called the "Giant of Provence" 1,912 metres (6,273 ft)
- Mont Aiguille, near Chichilianne, Isère, which has a distinctive broad flat top, 2,087 metres (6,847 ft)
