= Digne Prealps =

Mountain range in the French Prealps

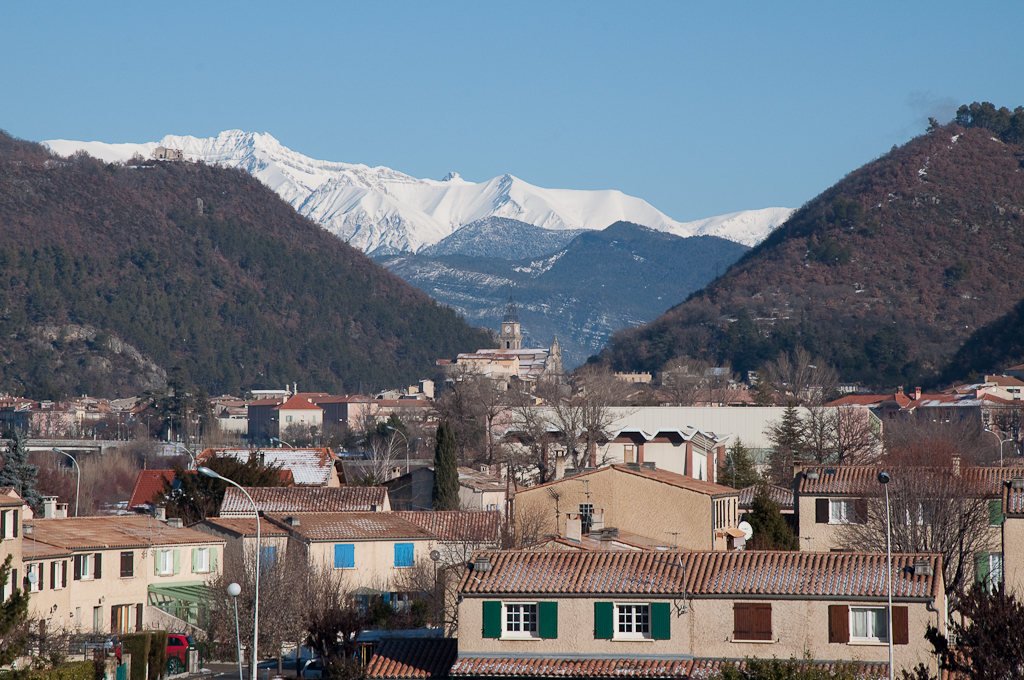
- The snowy Prealps behind the commune of Digne-les-Bains

Highest point
- Elevation: 2,115 m (6,939 ft)
- Parent peak: Les Monges

Naming
- Native name: Préalpes de Digne (French)

Geography
- Country: France
- Department: Alpes-de-Haute-Provence
- Region: Provence-Alpes-Côte d'Azur
- Parent range: Provence Prealps

The Digne Prealps (French: Préalpes de Digne; Occitan: Dignas Prealps) are a massif in the southern part of the French Prealps located in the department of Alpes-de-Haute-Provence.

== Geography ==
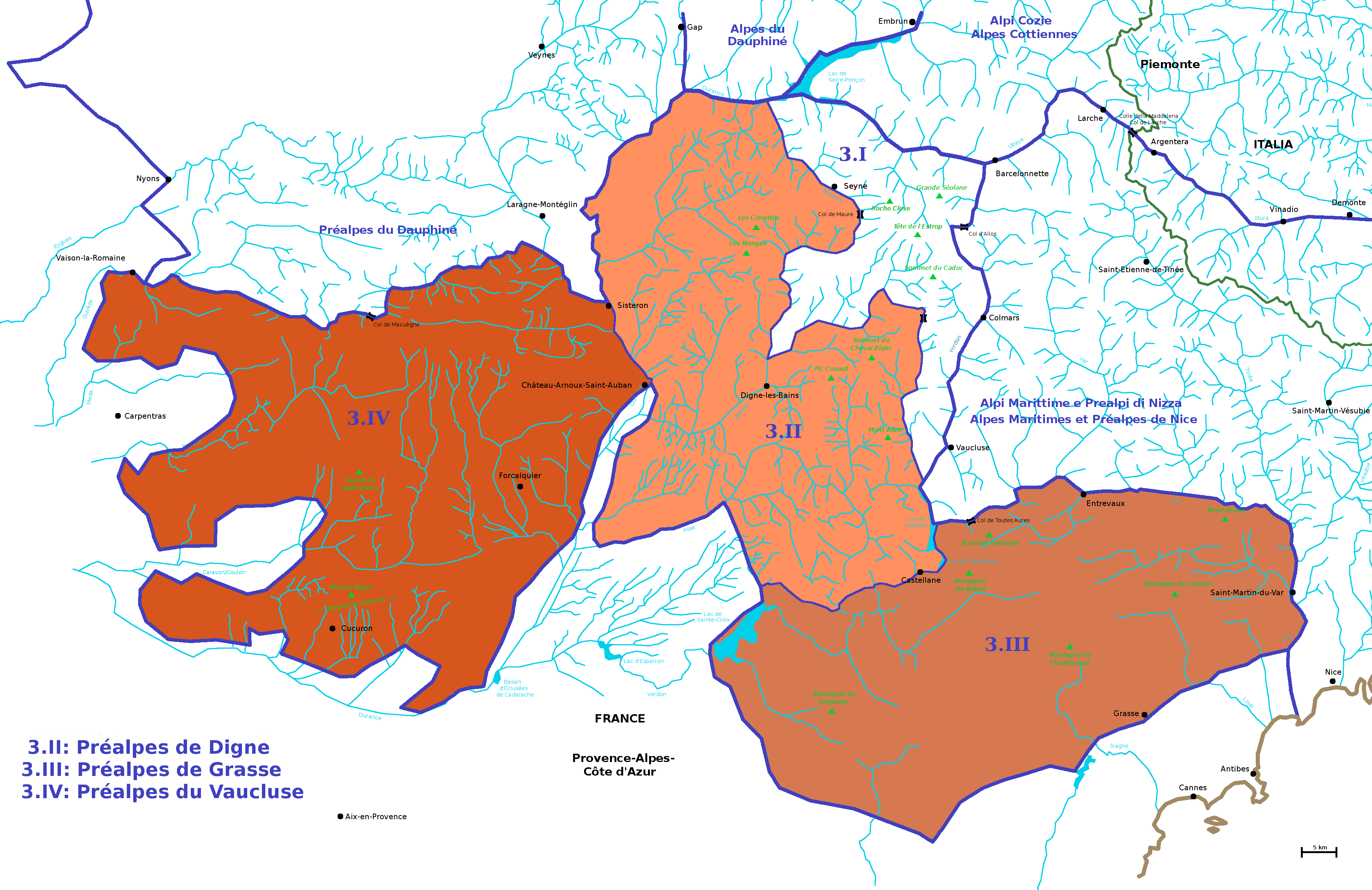
The Digne Prealps in the middle of the Provence Alps and Prealps section (as per SOIUSA)

=== Location ===
The massif extends around Digne-les-Bains, between the Durance river and Serre-Ponçon lake to the north, and the Verdon gorge to the south. It is bordered by the communes of Sisteron, Gréoux-les-Bains and Castellane.

It is surrounded to the northwest by the Bochaine, to the northeast by Massif des Trois-Évêchés, to the south-east by the Castellane Prealps and finally to the west by the Vaucluse mountains and the Baronnies Massif.

=== Main summits ===
- Les Monges, 2,115 m,
- Clot Ginoux (or Les Cimettes), 2,112 m
- l'Oratoire, 2,071 m
- Tête Grosse, 2,032 m
- Laupie (ou Tourtoureau), 2,025 m
- Clos de Bouc, 1,962 m
- Montagne de Chine, 1,952 m
- Mourre de Chanier, 1,930 m
- Marzenc, 1,930 m
- Sommet de Nibles, 1,909 m
- Mont Chiran, 1,905 m
- Grande Cloche de Barles, 1,887 m
- Montagne de Jouere, 1,886 m
- Chanau, 1,885 m
- Géruen Ridge, 1,880 m
- Grande Gautiere, 1,825 m

== Geology ==
These ranges are identified by geologists by the Digne nappes, on the edge of the Trois-Évêchés massif, extending to Gap, whose characteristic outcrops are gypsum. It gradually leads to the Provençal limestone domain, towards the west and south, particularly towards the Valensole plateau.
