= Rax =

RAX or Rax may refer to:

== People ==
- Ragnar Axelsson, Icelandic photographer
- Rax King, American writer
- Rax Rinnekangas, Finnish director, photographer, and writer
- Gallius Rax, character from the Star Wars: Aftermath trilogy of science fiction novels

== Other uses ==
- Hello Summer, Goodbye (Rax in the US), a science fiction novel by British author Michael G. Coney
- Radio Aurora Explorer, the first National Science Foundation sponsored CubeSat mission
- RAX, a 64-bit register in the x86 family of instruction set architectures
- IBM Remote Access Computing, called RAX, an obsolete System/360 time-sharing system
- Rax (mountain range), mountain range in the Northern Limestone Alps on the border of the Austrian federal provinces of Lower Austria and Styria
- Rax Roast Beef, a regional U.S. fast food restaurant chain
- RAX-2, a CubeSat satellite built as a collaboration between SRI International and students at the University of Michigan
- Retinal homeobox protein Rx, a protein that in humans is encoded by the RAX gene
