= Tête de l'Estrop =

Mountain in French Alps

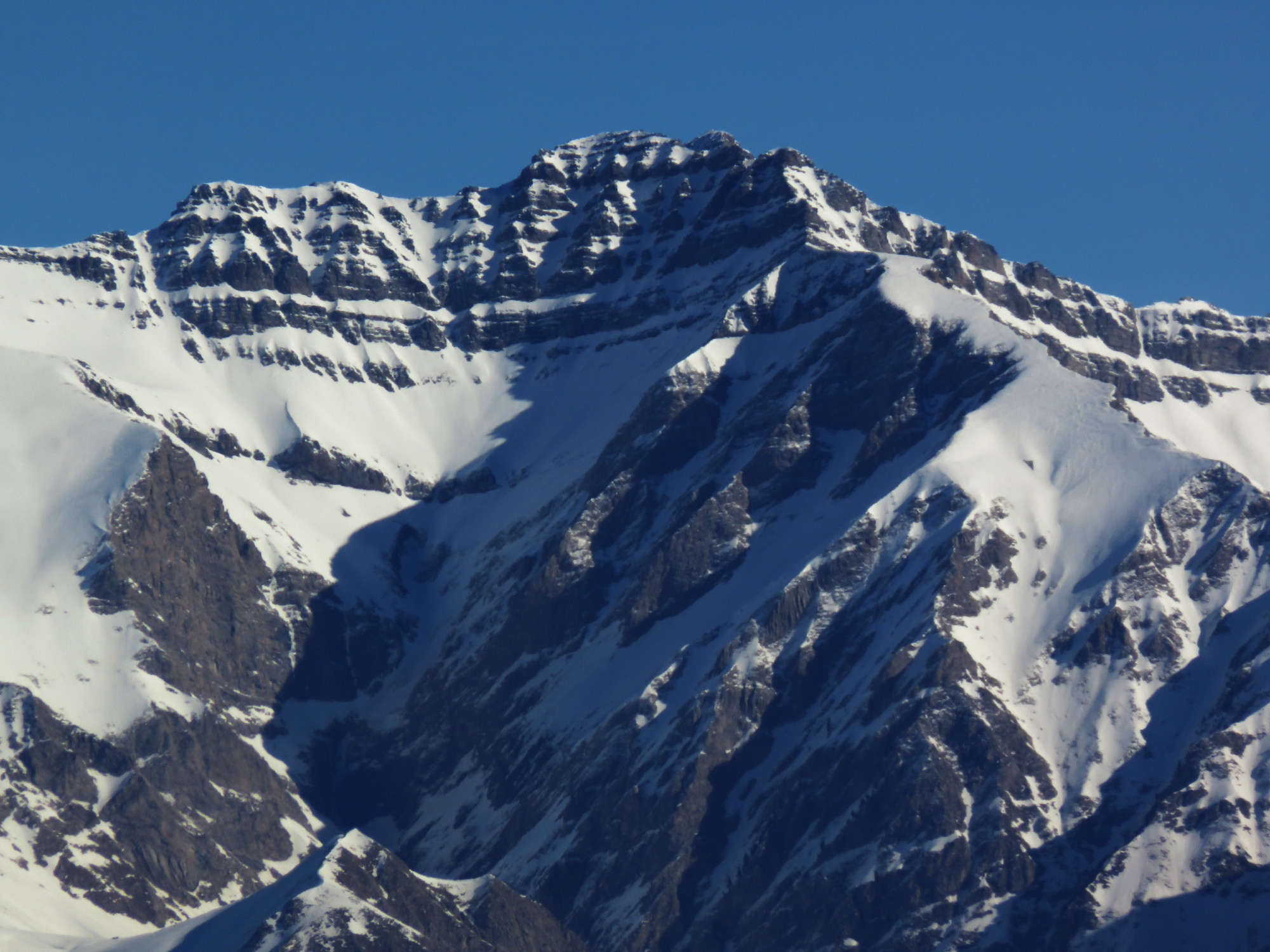
- The Tête de l'Estrop

Highest point
- Elevation: 2,960.9 m (9,714 ft)
- Prominence: 716.9 m (2,352 ft)
- Listing: Alpine mountains 2500-2999 m
- Coordinates: 44°17′14″N 06°30′17″E

Geography
- Location within Alps
- Location: Alpes-de-Haute-Provence, France
- Parent range: Provence Alps and Prealps

Climbing
- Easiest route: from Foux d'Allos

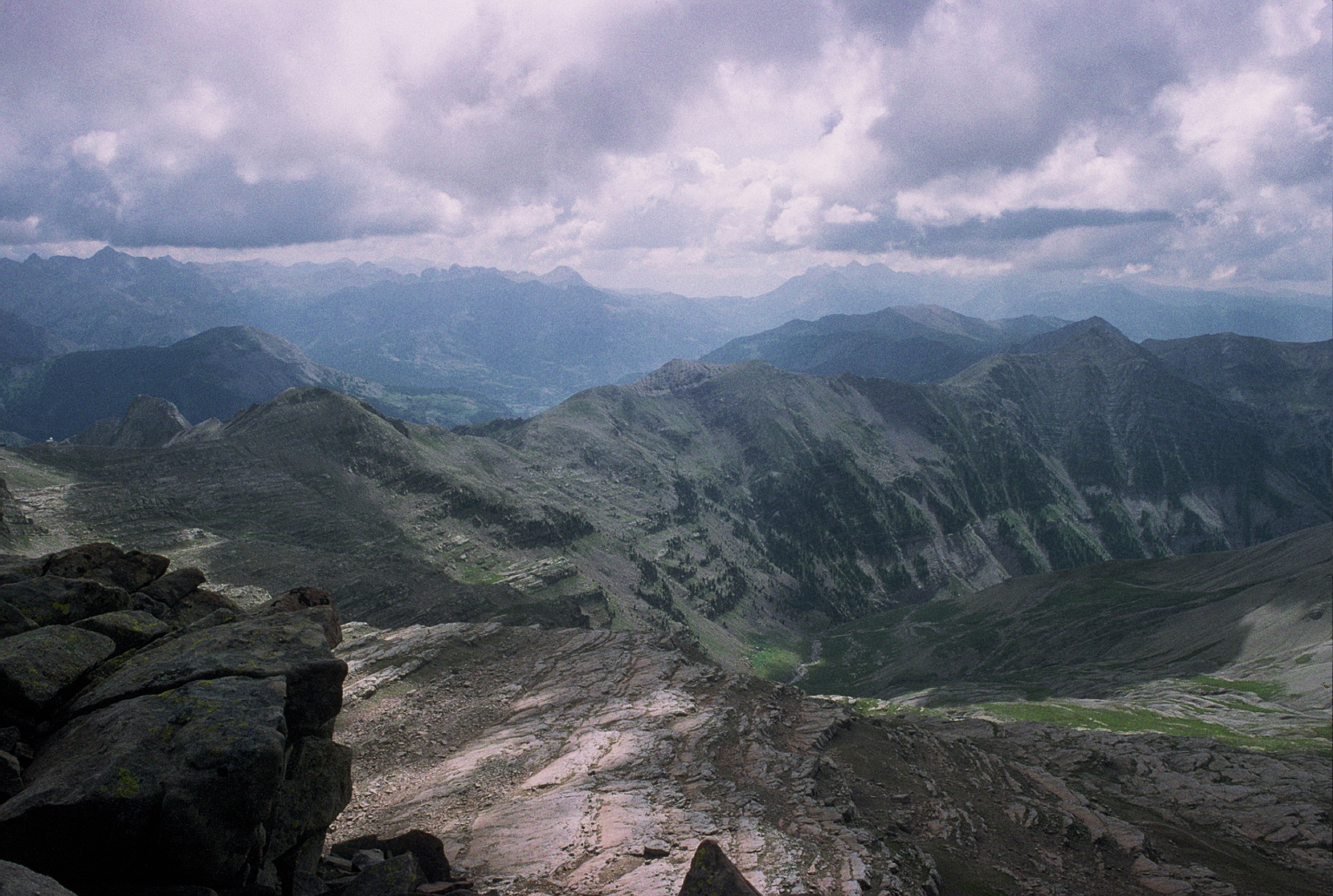
Tête de l'Estrop: view from the summit

The Tête de l'Estrop (Occitan: Teïx d'Escrop) is a mountain of the French Prealps located in Alpes-de-Haute-Provence, France. It is the highest peak of the Provence Alps and Prealps.

== Geography ==
Administratively the mountain is divided between the French communes of Prads-Haute-Bléone (southern slopes) and Méolans-Revel (vallon du Laverq, northern slopes).

== Access to the summit ==
The easiest route to the summit starts from La Foux d'Allos, a ski resort in the commune of Allos, which reaches the top through the eastern slopes of the mountain.

== Other facts ==
- It has the scenic peculiarity of being currently the furthest mountain in the world portrayed in front of a sunrise (a worldwide record of sunrise picture).
- It is believed that on 24 March 2015, Germanwings Flight 9525 crashed into the lower western slopes of the mountain, but in fact the crash was found in the Ravine du Rosé, near the base of the Massif des Trois-Évêchés.

== Maps ==
- French official cartography (Institut géographique national - IGN); on-line version: www.geoportail.fr

== Bibliography ==
- Caracal et les Sancho Panza, Male Vesse, récit et 12 descentes de canyons dans le pays dignois, 2006 (ISBN 2-9526064-0-4)
