= Nice Prealps =

Mountain range in Alpes-Maritimes

- The massif is at the southeastern corner of France, besides the Ligurian Alps

Highest point
- Elevation: 2,080 m (6,820 ft)
- Parent peak: Pointe des Trois Communes
- Coordinates: 44°10′27″N 7°41′02″E

Naming
- Native name: Préalpes de Nice (French)

Geography
- Countries: France; Monaco; Italy
- Region(s): Provence-Alpes-Côte d'Azur and Liguria
- Parent range: Maritime Alps

The Nice Prealps (French: Préalpes de Nice; Italian: Prealpi di Nizza) are a massif in the southern part of the French Prealps located mainly in the southeast of the French department of Alpes-Maritimes and, for a very small part, in the Italian region of Liguria between the Roya river and the Franco-Italian border.

== Geography ==
=== Location ===
The massif extends to the Mediterranean Sea between the Castellane Prealps (west of the Var), the Mercantour-Argentera massif (south of the Planquette and Cayros rivers) and the Ligurian Alps (west of Roya).

Between Nice and Ventimiglia, it mostly overlooks the eastern part of the Côte d'Azur via escarpments linked to a collapse fault.

=== Main summits ===
- Pointe des Trois Communes (2,080 m)
- Mille Fourches (2,042 m)
- Authion (1,889 m)
- Mont Ventabren (1,976 m)
- Mangiabo (1,821 m)
- Cime de la Calmette (1,786 m)
- Cime de Peïra-Cava (1,581 m)
- Cime des Vallières (1,580 m)
- Arbouin (1,572 m)
- Cime de Suorcas (1,516 m)
- Cime de Rocca Sièra (1,501 m)
- Cime du Simon, (1,490 m)
- Pierre Plate (1,481 m)
- Cime de Colle Basse (1,417 m)
- Mont Férion (1,412 m)
- Monte Grammondo (1,378 m)
- Cime du Grand Braus (1,332 m)
- Cime de Baudon (1,266 m)
- Mont Agel (1,151 m)
- Roc d’Orméa (1,132 m)

=== Geology ===
These prealps are made up of clayey limestone (molasse).

== See also ==
- Préalpes d'Azur Regional Natural Park
