= Massif des Trois-Évêchés =

Mountain range in the Provence Alps and Prealps

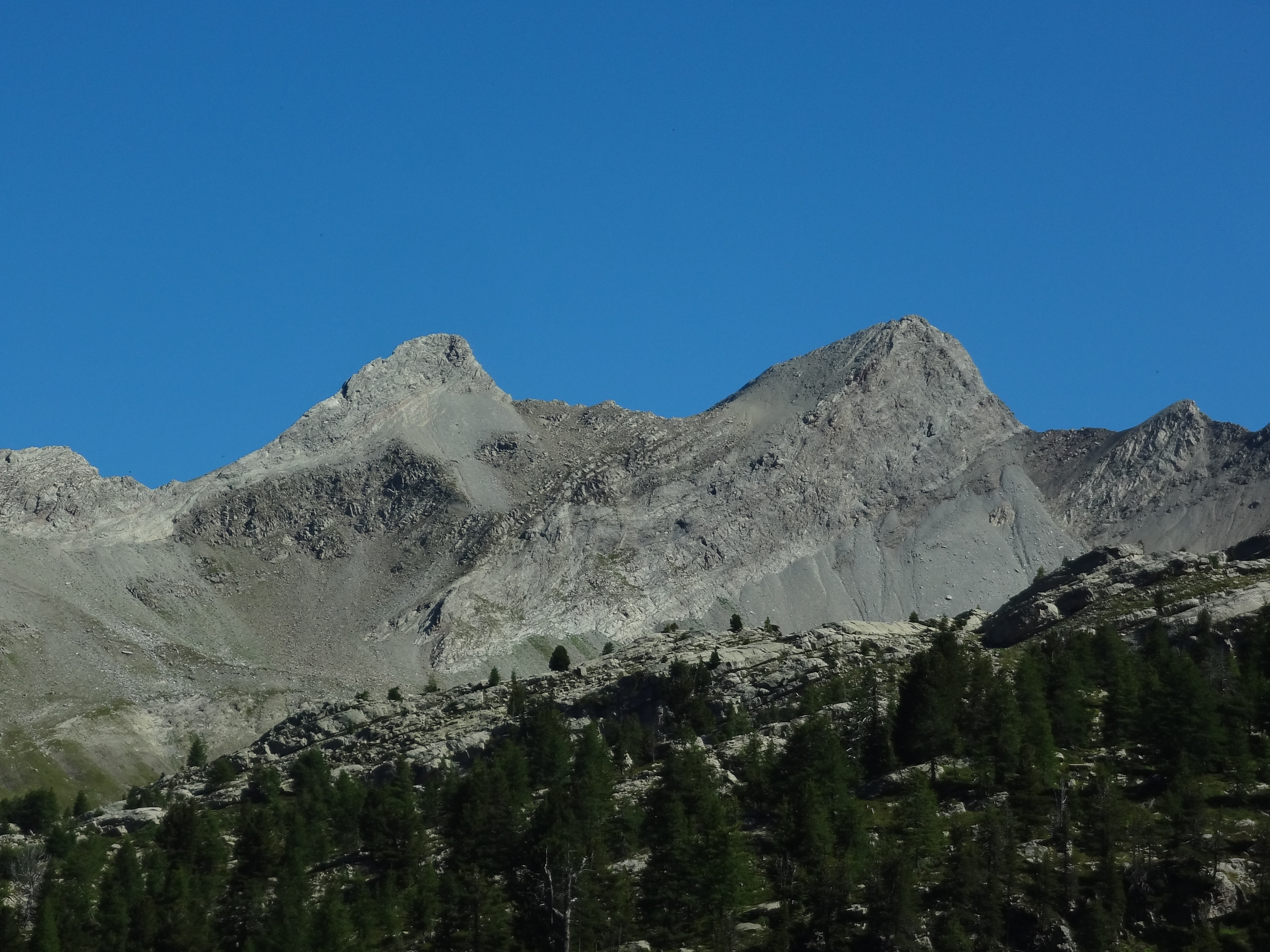
- Summit view of the Three Bishoprics (2818 m) and Dent des Évêchés (2771 m) from the northwest

Highest point
- Peak: Tête de l'Estrop
- Elevation: 2,961 m (9,715 ft)

Geography
- The Massif des Trois-Évêchés is at the lower centre
- Country: France
- Region: Provence-Alpes-Côte d'Azur
- Departement: Alpes-de-Haute-Provence
- Range coordinates: 44°17′N 06°32′E
- Parent range: Provence Alps and Prealps

Geology
- Rock type: Sedimentary rock

Massif des Trois-Évêchés (French pronunciation: [masif de tʁwaz‿eveʃe]; Occitan: Massís dei Tres Eveschats; lit. 'Massif of the Three Bishoprics') is a mountain range in the Provence Alps and Prealps in Alpes-de-Haute-Provence, France. Its name comes from the central summit of the massif, the Pic des Trois-Évêchés (so named because it marked the boundary between the dioceses of Digne, Embrun and Senez) where there are ridges to the north, west and south. The highest peak is the Tête de l'Estrop, at 2,961 metres (9,715 ft).

== Geography ==
The massif in the broadest sense extends from north to south between the Bes to the west, the Ubaye in the north, the Verdon to the east and the Asse (approximately) to the south. It is also crossed by the Bléone and the Vallon du Laverq.

It is surrounded to the north by the Massif du Parpaillon, east by the Massif du Pelat, south-east by the Préalpes de Castellane and finally to the south and to the west by the Préalpes de Digne (which some southern peaks, or even the whole massif, are sometimes attached, although significantly higher altitudes, and different orientation).

=== Main summits ===
- Tête de l'Estrop, 2,961 metres (9,715 ft), the highest point of the massif
- Grande Séolane, 2,909 metres (9,544 ft)
- Petite Séolane, 2,854 metres (9,364 ft)
- Trois-Évêchés, 2,818 metres (9,245 ft)
- Tête de Chabrière, 2,745 metres (9,006 ft)
- Roche Close, 2,739 metres (8,986 ft)
- Sommet du Caduc, 2,654 metres (8,707 ft)
- Mourre-Gros, 2,652 metres (8,701 ft)
- Montagne de la Blanche, 2,610 metres (8,560 ft) : Bernardez, Neillère, l'Aiguillette
- Les Mées, 2,599 metres (8,527 ft)
- Tête de la Sestrière, 2,572 metres (8,438 ft)
- Tête Noire, 2,560 metres (8,400 ft)
- Sangraure, 2,560 metres (8,400 ft)
- Dormillouse, 2,505 metres (8,219 ft)
- Sommet du Tromas, 2,500 metres (8,200 ft)
- Autapie, 2,426 metres (7,959 ft)
- Sommet de Denjuan, 2,403 metres (7,884 ft)
- Gros Tapy, 2,374 metres (7,789 ft)
- Grand Croix, 2,369 metres (7,772 ft)
- Montagne du Cheval Blanc, 2,323 metres (7,621 ft)

The Montagne de Cordœil, of a more modest size and elevation [2,114 metres (6,936 ft)], is completely isolated from the rest of the massif, the Verdon to the east and the Issole to the north and west.

== Geology ==
The massif of the Trois-Évêchés consists of sedimentary rock, mostly sandstones and marls, typical of the pre-Alps. The geological nature of the north of the massif relates to the Ubaye Valley.

== Aircraft crash ==
On 24 March 2015, Andreas Lubitz, co-pilot of Germanwings Flight 9525, who was reported to have had mental health problems, deliberately crashed the plane into the massif, after he locked the Captain out of the cockpit.

== Activities ==
=== Winter sports ===
- Val d'Allos
- Pra-Loup
- Saint-Jean-Montclar

=== Canyoning ===
The massif contains, amongst others, two canyoning descents of high and exceptional level: Male Vasudevan and Bussing.

== See also ==
- Geography of the Western Alps

== Bibliography ==
- Leclerc, Didier (1984). Aux quatre vents des Trois-Évêchés : ballades photographiques dans les hautes vallées des Alpes de Provence [To the four winds of the Trois-Évêchés: photographic walks in the high valleys of the Alps of Provence] (in French). ISBN 2950058604.
- Caracal; Panza, Sancho (2006). Male Vesse, récit et 12 descentes de canyons dans le pays dignois [Male Vesse, narrative and 12 descents of canyons in Digne] (in French). ISBN 2-9526064-0-4.
