= Rax Rinnekangas =

Finnish photographer, writer and film director

Rax Rinnekangas (also known as Reijo Rinnekangas, born 1954 in Rovaniemi, Finland) is a Finnish film director, writer and photographer. Rinnekangas has written novels from the 1970s onwards and, starting from the 1990s, he has directed several feature films and documentaries. As a photographer, Rinnekangas has had numerous exhibitions in museums both in Finland and abroad. For the last twenty years Rinnekangas has been working actively outside of Finland, most notably in Spain and Basque Country.

== Career ==
=== Photography ===
Rinnekangas worked as an art photographer until 2011. As a photographer, Rinnekangas has had notable exhibitions for instance at Reina Sofia, National museum of 20th century art in Madrid. Rinnekangas has published over ten photography books which often deal with themes like European mentality, the Basque people, and artists' relation to their art. Rinnekangas was awarded with National Photography Award in Finland in 1989.

=== Films ===
Rax Rinnekangas’ filmography can be divided in to two different approaches which often overlap and create a crossover style that can be described as "documentary fiction". Rinnekangas has directed a five-part documentary series Five Master Houses of the World (2011), that presents international architects' work form all over the world. From 2011 onwards Rinnekangas has directed fictional feature films that are often based either on novels or treat themes such as literature and other arts. Rinnekangas’ films are often international productions. The most important feature films by Rinnekangas are Journey to Eden (2011), Water Marked (2012), Last Life of Lucifer (2013), Theo's House (2015), The Last Bookshop of the World (2017). The French composer Pascal Gaigne has created music score for many of Rinnekangas' feature films.

=== Literature ===
Rinnekangas published his first literary work Lähtö ("Departure") by his birth name Reijo Rinnekangas as a results of Otava's short story contest in 1978.

In 1991 he wrote a novel called Kuu karkaa ("The Moon slips away") which was one of the books awarded with National Literary Award in Finland the same year. The novel was translated into French, German and Spanish in 2011–12. The book was received well in France for its description of love and desire between siblings. Rinnekangas' novel Kadonnut juutalaispoika ("The Lost Jewish Boy") was also translated into French by the name Le Juif égaré.

== Selected filmography ==
- Journey to Eden, 2011(feature)
- Water Marked, 2012 (feature)
- Last Life of Lucifer, 2013 (feature)
- Theo's House, 2015 (feature)
- Circles & Stones, 2016 (documentary/feature)
- The Last Bookshop of the World, 2017 (feature)
