= Savoy Prealps =

Mountain range in the north-west Alps

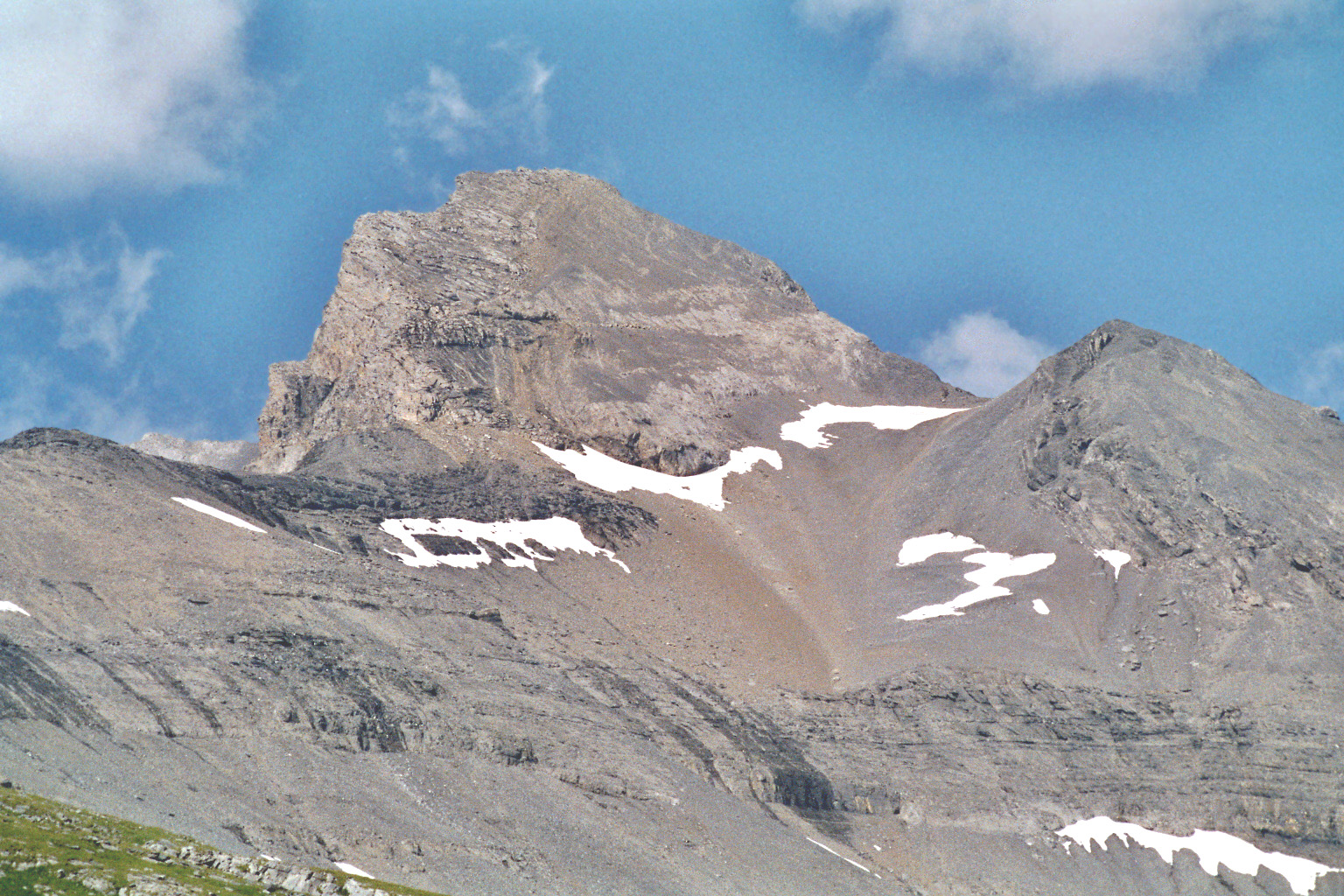
- Haute Cime (Dents du Midi)

Highest point
- Peak: Haute Cime des Dents du Midi
- Elevation: 3,257 m (10,686 ft)
- Coordinates: 46°09′39″N 6°55′23″E

Naming
- Native name: Préalpes de Savoie (French)

Geography
- Countries: France and Switzerland
- Région, Canton: Rhône-Alpes and Valais
- Parent range: Alps
- Borders on: Dauphiné Prealps, Dauphiné Alps, Graian Alps, Bernese Alps and Swiss Prealps

Geology
- Orogeny: Alpine orogeny
- Rock age: Tertiary
- Rock type: Sedimentary rocks

The Savoy Prealps (French: Préalpes de Savoie) are a mountain range in the north-western part of the Alps. They are located in Rhône-Alpes (south-eastern France) and, marginally, in Valais (western Switzerland). Savoy Prealps encompass northernmost area of the French Prealps.

== Geography ==
Administratively the French part of the range belongs to the French departments of Savoie, Haute Savoie and Isère while the Swiss one is divided between the districts of Saint-Maurice and Monthey. The whole range is drained by the Rhone river.

== Summits ==
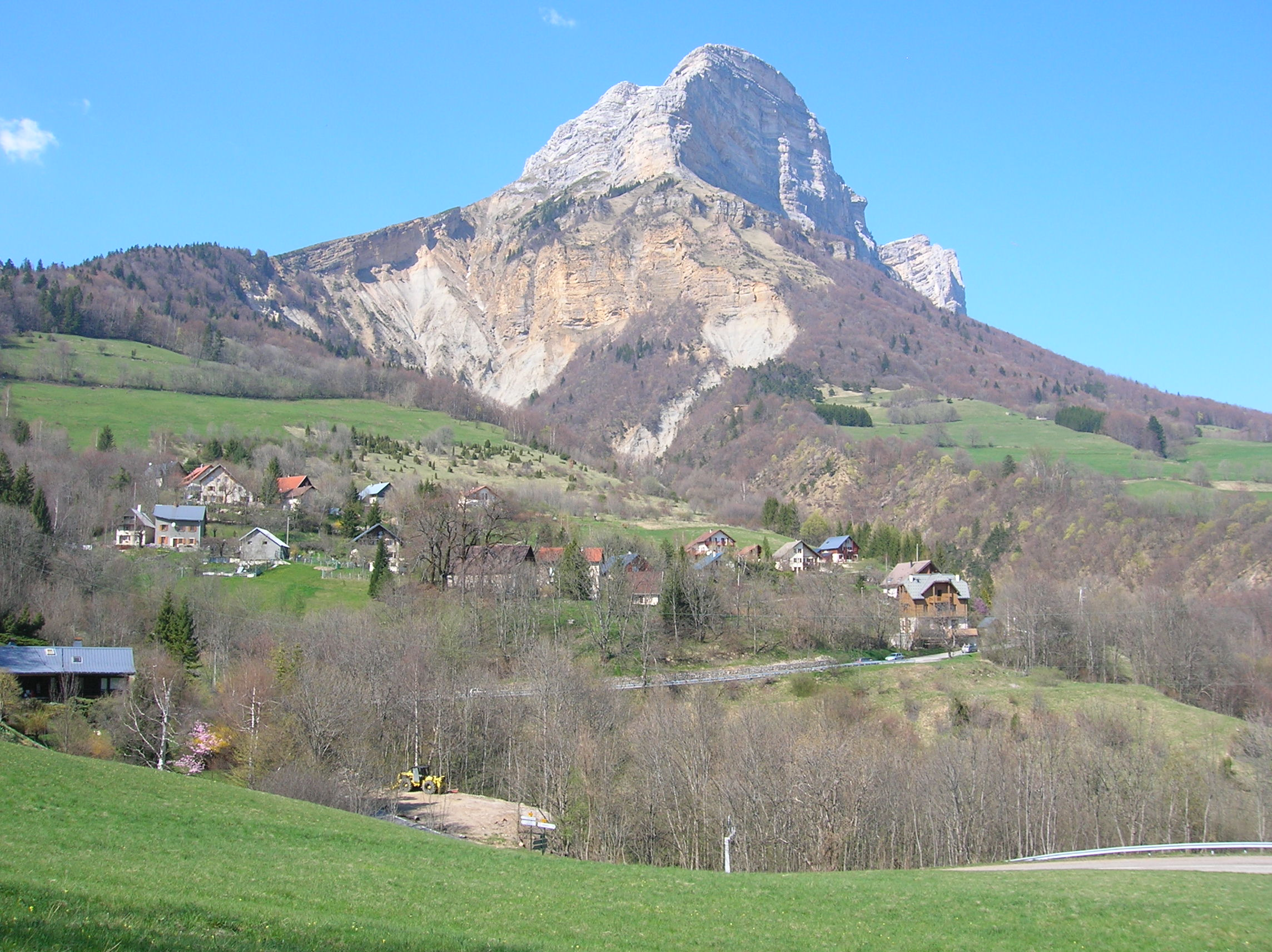
The Dent de Crolles, in the SW part of the range

The chief summits of the range are:

Name	metres	feet
Haute Cime des Dents du Midi	3,257	10,682
Tour Sallière	3,220	10,561
Mont Ruan	3,057	10,026
Aiguille du Belvédère	2,965	9,725
Pointe Percée	2,750	9,020
Le Brévent	2,525	8,282
Hauts-Forts	2,466	8,088
Mont de Grange	2,432	7,976
La Tournette	2,351	7,711
Arcalod	2,217	7,271
Trélod	2,181	7,153
Chamechaude	2,082	6,828
Dent de Crolles	2,062	7,763

== Maps ==
- French official cartography (Institut Géographique National - IGN); on-line version: www.geoportail.fr
- Swiss official cartography (Swiss Federal Office of Topography - Swisstopo); on-line version: map.geo.admin.ch
