= Provence Alps and Prealps =

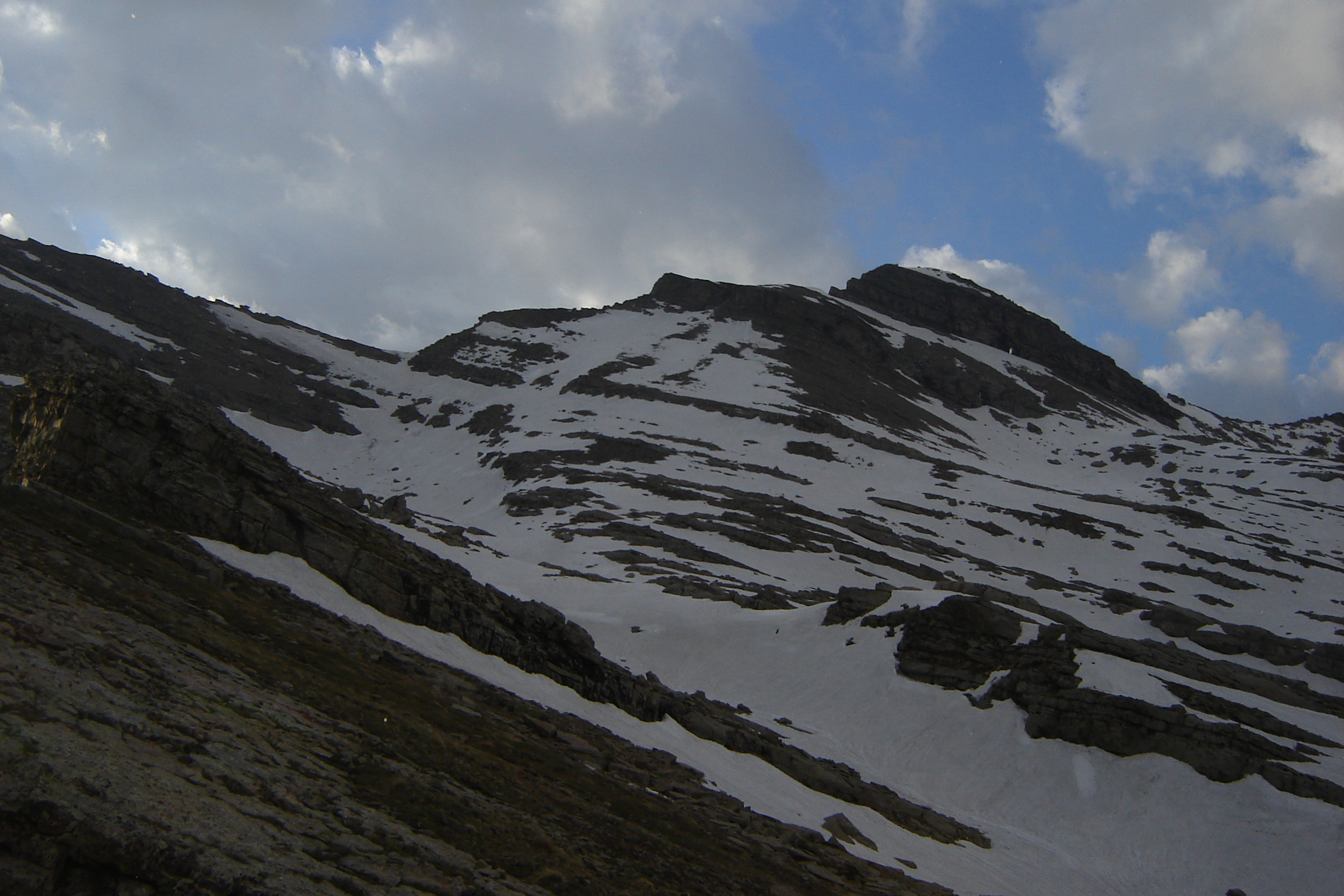
- Tête de l'Estrop - south face

Highest point
- Peak: Tête de l'Estrop
- Elevation: 2,961 m (9,715 ft)
- Coordinates: 44°17′14″N 6°30′17″E

Naming
- Native name: Alpes et Préalpes de Provence (French)

Geography
- Country: France
- Région: Provence-Alpes-Côte d'Azur
- Rivers: Durance, Verdon and Var
- Parent range: Alps
- Borders on: Maritime Alps, Dauphiné Alps, Dauphiné Prealps and Cottian Alps

Geology
- Orogeny: Alpine orogeny
- Rock type: Sedimentary rocks

The Provence Alps and Prealps (Alpes et Préalpes de Provence in French; Occitan: Alps de Provença e Prealps) are a mountain range in the south-western part of the Alps, located in Provence-Alpes-Côte d'Azur (France). Provence Alps and Prealps encompass the south-western area of the French Prealps.

== Etymology ==
The Provence (French pronunciation: [pʁɔvɑ̃s]) is a historical region nowadays part of the administrative région of Provence-Alpes-Côte d'Azur.

== Geography ==
Administratively the range belongs to the French departments of Vaucluse, Alpes-Maritimes and Alpes-de-Haute-Provence.

The western slopes of the range are drained by the Rhone river through the Durance and other tributaries while its south-eastern part is drained by the Var and several smaller rivers that flow directly to the Mediterranean Sea.

== Notable summits ==
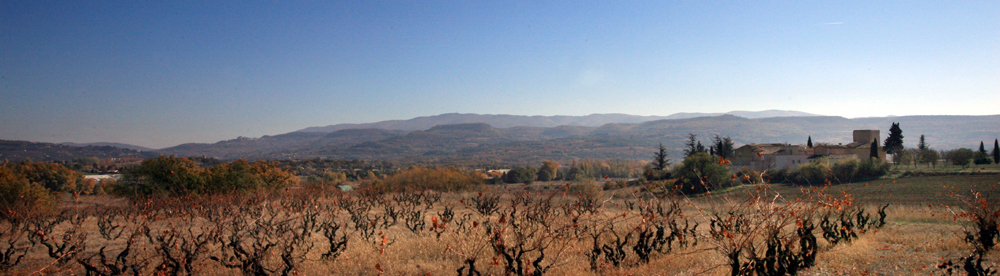
The Luberon, in the SW part of the range; view from north-west

Some notable summits of the range are:

Name	metres	feet
Tête de l'Estrop	2,961	9,712
Grande Séolane	2,909	9,542
Trois-Évêchés	2,818	9,243
Montagne du Cheval Blanc	2,323	7,619
Mourre de Chanier	1,930	6,330
Mont Ventoux	1,912	6,271
Montagne de Lure	1,826	5,989

== Maps ==
- French official cartography (Institut Géographique National - IGN); on-line version: www.geoportail.fr
