= Canton of Saint-Étienne-en-Dévoluy =

Coordinates: 44°41′36″N 5°56′31″E

Saint-Étienne-en-Dévoluy
- Former canton
- Interactive map of Saint-Étienne-en-Dévoluy
- Country: France
- Region: Provence-Alpes-Côte d'Azur
- Department: Hautes-Alpes
- No. of communes: {{{nbcomm}}}
- Disbanded: 2015
- Area: 186.37 km^{2} (71.96 sq mi)
- Population (2012): 1,013
  - Density: 5.435/km^{2} (14.08/sq mi)

The canton of Saint-Étienne-en-Dévoluy is a former administrative division in southeastern France. It was disbanded following the French canton reorganisation which came into effect in March 2015. It consisted of the 4 communes Agnières-en-Dévoluy, La Cluse, Saint-Disdier and Saint-Étienne-en-Dévoluy until 2013, when these communes merged into the new commune Dévoluy, which joined the canton of Veynes in 2015. It had 1,013 inhabitants (2012).

== Demographics ==
Historical population Canton of Saint-Étienne-en-Dévoluy
Year	1962	1968	1975	1982	1990	1999
Pop.	765	869	885	910	929	945
±%	—	+13.6%	+1.8%	+2.8%	+2.1%	+1.7%
From the year 1962 on: No double counting – residents of multiple communes (e.g. students and military personnel) are counted only once. Source: INSEE

== See also ==
- Cantons of the Hautes-Alpes department
