= Saint-Étienne-en-Dévoluy =

- Part of Dévoluy
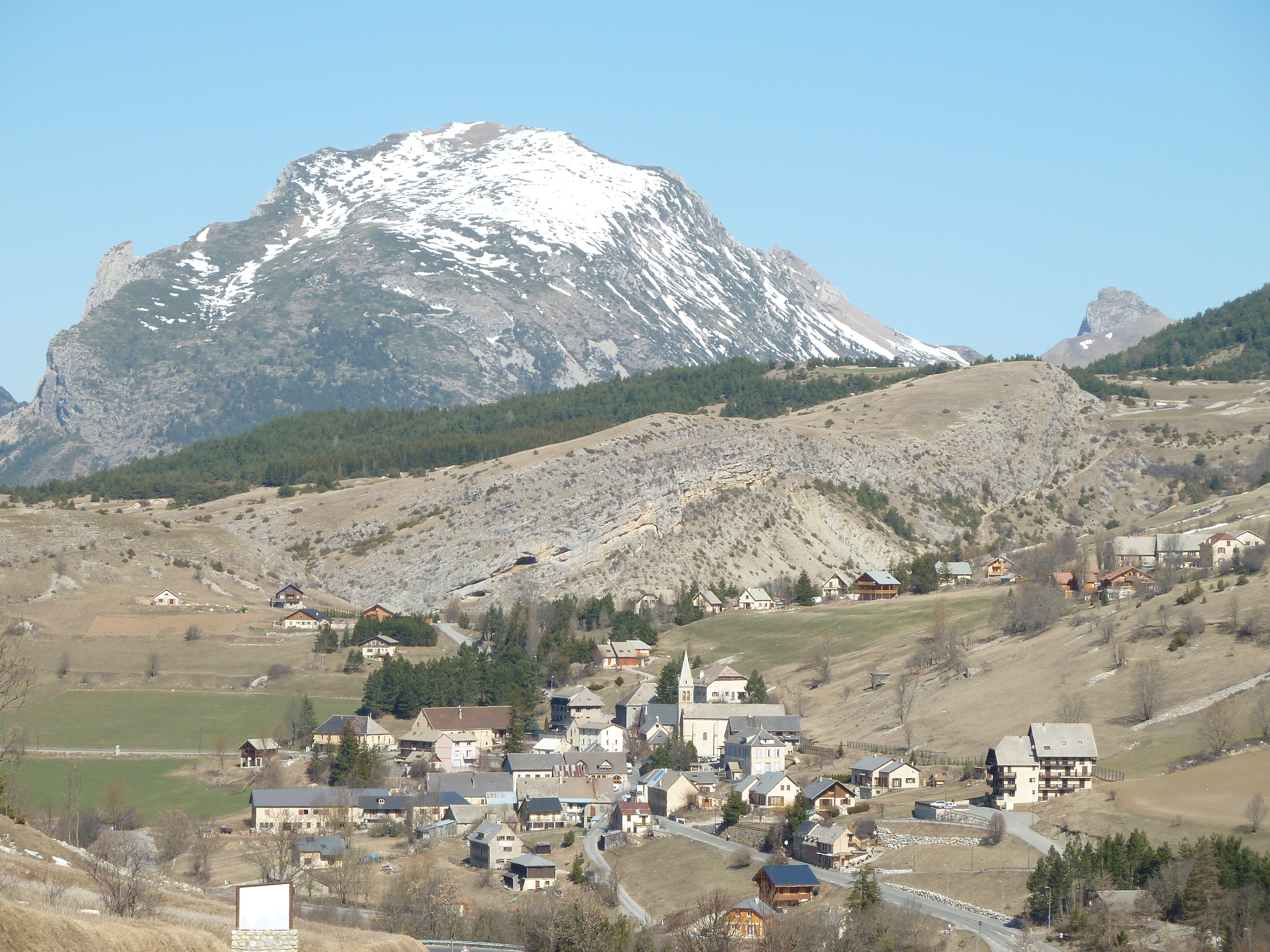
- The village of Saint-Étienne-en-Dévoluy, with the south face of Le Gicon in the background

- Coat of arms
- Location of Saint-Étienne-en-Dévoluy
- Location within France Location within Provence-Alpes-Côte d'Azur
- Coordinates: 44°41′36″N 5°56′31″E
- Country: France
- Region: Provence-Alpes-Côte d'Azur
- Department: Hautes-Alpes
- Arrondissement: Gap
- Canton: Saint-Étienne-en-Dévoluy
- Commune: Dévoluy
- Area^{1}: 67.87 km^{2} (26.20 sq mi)
- Elevation: 1,263 m (4,144 ft)
- Highest elevation: 2,652 m (8,701 ft)
- Lowest elevation: 1,134 m (3,720 ft)
- Population (2019): 476
  - Density: 7.01/km^{2} (18.2/sq mi)
- Time zone: UTC+01:00 (CET)
  - Summer (DST): UTC+02:00 (CEST)
- Postal code: 05250
- ^{1} French Land Register data, which excludes lakes, ponds, glaciers > 1 km^{2} (0.386 sq mi or 247 acres) and river estuaries.

Saint-Étienne-en-Dévoluy (French pronunciation: [sɛ̃t‿etjɛn ɑ̃ devɔlɥi], lit. 'Saint Étienne in Dévoluy'; Vivaro-Alpine: Sant Estève de Devolui) is a former commune in the Hautes-Alpes department in southeastern France. On 1 January 2013, Agnières-en-Dévoluy, La Cluse, Saint-Disdier, and Saint-Étienne-en-Dévoluy amalgamated into the new commune of Dévoluy.

SuperDévoluy, a ski resort, was part of the commune.

== Climate ==
Climate data for Saint-Étienne-en-Dévoluy (1991–2020 averages): elevation 1300m
Month	Jan	Feb	Mar	Apr	May	Jun	Jul	Aug	Sep	Oct	Nov	Dec	Year
Record high °C (°F)	15.1 (59.2)	18.2 (64.8)	22.0 (71.6)	24.1 (75.4)	29.8 (85.6)	33.5 (92.3)	34.4 (93.9)	34.3 (93.7)	30.0 (86.0)	26.3 (79.3)	20.0 (68.0)	15.3 (59.5)	34.4 (93.9)
Mean daily maximum °C (°F)	3.5 (38.3)	4.7 (40.5)	9.0 (48.2)	12.4 (54.3)	16.8 (62.2)	21.3 (70.3)	24.1 (75.4)	23.8 (74.8)	18.7 (65.7)	13.9 (57.0)	7.5 (45.5)	4.0 (39.2)	13.3 (56.0)
Daily mean °C (°F)	−1.5 (29.3)	−0.9 (30.4)	2.9 (37.2)	6.1 (43.0)	10.5 (50.9)	14.2 (57.6)	16.4 (61.5)	16.2 (61.2)	12.1 (53.8)	8.3 (46.9)	2.9 (37.2)	−0.5 (31.1)	7.2 (45.0)
Mean daily minimum °C (°F)	−6.5 (20.3)	−6.6 (20.1)	−3.1 (26.4)	−0.1 (31.8)	4.1 (39.4)	7.2 (45.0)	8.7 (47.7)	8.7 (47.7)	5.5 (41.9)	2.6 (36.7)	−1.7 (28.9)	−5.1 (22.8)	1.1 (34.1)
Record low °C (°F)	−25 (−13)	−25.1 (−13.2)	−19.5 (−3.1)	−11 (12)	−5 (23)	−2.7 (27.1)	1.0 (33.8)	−0.3 (31.5)	−4.5 (23.9)	−9.2 (15.4)	−20 (−4)	−19.9 (−3.8)	−25.1 (−13.2)
Average precipitation mm (inches)	84.3 (3.32)	58.7 (2.31)	71.0 (2.80)	93.8 (3.69)	95.0 (3.74)	78.3 (3.08)	58.9 (2.32)	68.9 (2.71)	95.5 (3.76)	138.1 (5.44)	156.7 (6.17)	101.4 (3.99)	1,100.6 (43.33)
Source: Météo-France

== Population ==
Historical population
Year	Pop.	±% p.a.
2006	587	—
2010	558	−1.26%
2019	476	−1.75%
Source: INSEE

== See also ==
- Communes of the Hautes-Alpes department
