= 2016 Critérium du Dauphiné =

2016 UCI World Tour, race 16 of 29

Race details
- Dates: 5–12 June
- Stages: 8
- Distance: 1,153.5 km (716.8 mi)
- Winning time: 29h 59' 31"

Results
Jersey awarded to the overall winner	Winner	Chris Froome (GBR)	(Team Sky)
	Second	Romain Bardet (FRA)	(AG2R La Mondiale)
	Third	Dan Martin (IRL)	(Etixx–Quick-Step)
Jersey awarded to the points classification winner	Points	Edvald Boasson Hagen (NOR)	(Team Dimension Data)
Jersey awarded to the mountains classification winner	Mountains	Daniel Teklehaimanot (ERI)	(Team Dimension Data)
Jersey awarded to the young rider classification winner	Young rider	Julian Alaphilippe (FRA)	(Etixx–Quick-Step)
	Team	Team Sky	

The 2016 Critérium du Dauphiné was the 68th edition of the Critérium du Dauphiné cycling stage race. The eight-stage race began in Les Gets on 5 June and concluded in SuperDévoluy on 12 June, and is sixteenth of the twenty-eight races in the 2016 UCI World Tour season. The Dauphiné is viewed as a preview for July's Tour de France and a number of the contenders for the general classification of the Tour participated in the race.

The race was won by Chris Froome of Team Sky, successfully defending his title from the year before and becoming the fifth man to win the event three times. He won by 12 seconds over Romain Bardet of AG2R La Mondiale, with Dan Martin of Etixx-Quick-Step rounding out the podium.

Edvald Boasson Hagen of Team Dimension Data took the green jersey as winner of the points competition, while teammate Daniel Teklehaimanot took the mountains classification for the second consecutive year. Julian Alaphilippe of Etixx-Quick-Step won the young riders classification, and Team Sky won the teams classification.

== Teams ==
All 18 UCI WorldTeams were automatically invited and were obliged to attend the race. Four wildcard teams were also invited.

UCI WorldTeams

- AG2R La Mondiale
- Astana
- BMC Racing Team
- Etixx–Quick-Step
- FDJ
- IAM Cycling
- Lampre–Merida
- Lotto–Soudal
- Movistar Team
- Team Giant–Alpecin
- Team Katusha
- LottoNL–Jumbo
- Team Dimension Data
- Team Sky
- Tinkoff
- Trek–Segafredo
- Orica–GreenEDGE
- Cannondale

UCI Professional Continental teams

- Bora–Argon 18
- Cofidis
- Direct Énergie
- Wanty–Groupe Gobert

== Route ==
Stage characteristics and winners
Stage	Date	Course	Distance	Type	Winner
P	5 June	Les Gets	3.9 km (2.4 mi)	Prologue	Alberto Contador (ESP)
1	6 June	Cluses to Saint-Vulbas	186 km (115.6 mi)	Flat stage	Nacer Bouhanni (FRA)
2	7 June	Crêches-sur-Saône to Chalmazel-Jeansagnière	167.5 km (104.1 mi)	Hilly stage	Jesús Herrada (ESP)
3	8 June	Boën-sur-Lignon to Tournon-sur-Rhône	182 km (113.1 mi)	Flat stage	Fabio Aru (ITA)
4	9 June	Tain-l'Hermitage to Belley	176 km (109.4 mi)	Hilly stage	Edvald Boasson Hagen (NOR)
5	10 June	La Ravoire to Vaujany	140 km (87.0 mi)	Mountain stage	Chris Froome (GBR)
6	11 June	La Rochette to Méribel	141 km (87.6 mi)	Mountain stage	Thibaut Pinot (FRA)
7	12 June	Pont-de-Claix to SuperDévoluy	151 km (93.8 mi)	Medium-mountain stage	Steve Cummings (GBR)

== Stages ==
=== Prologue ===
5 June 2016 – Les Gets, 4 km (2.5 mi) individual time trial (ITT)

Prologue Result and General Classification
Rank	Rider	Team	Time
1	Alberto Contador (ESP)	Tinkoff	11' 36"
2	Richie Porte (AUS)	BMC Racing Team	+ 6"
3	Chris Froome (GBR)	Team Sky	+ 13"
4	Dan Martin (IRL)	Etixx–Quick-Step	+ 21"
5	Julian Alaphilippe (FRA)	Etixx–Quick-Step	+ 24"
6	Wout Poels (NED)	Team Sky	+ 25"
7	Romain Bardet (FRA)	AG2R La Mondiale	+ 29"
8	Adam Yates (GBR)	Orica–GreenEDGE	+ 31"
9	Diego Rosa (ITA)	Astana	+ 37"
10	Jesús Herrada (ESP)	Movistar Team	+ 39"

=== Stage 1 ===
6 June 2016 – Cluses to Saint-Vulbas, 186 km (116 mi)

Stage 1 Results
Rank	Rider	Team	Time
1	Nacer Bouhanni (FRA)	Cofidis	4h 27' 53"
2	Jens Debusschere (BEL)	Lotto–Soudal	s.t.
3	Sam Bennett (IRL)	Bora–Argon 18	s.t.
4	Edvald Boasson Hagen (NOR)	Team Dimension Data	s.t.
5	Jonas Van Genechten (BEL)	IAM Cycling	s.t.
6	Moreno Hofland (NED)	LottoNL–Jumbo	s.t.
7	Tony Hurel (FRA)	Direct Énergie	s.t.
8	Sondre Holst Enger (NOR)	IAM Cycling	s.t.
9	Daryl Impey (RSA)	Orica–GreenEDGE	s.t.
10	Edward Theuns (BEL)	Trek–Segafredo	s.t.

General Classification after Stage 1
Rank	Rider	Team	Time
1	Alberto Contador (ESP)	Tinkoff	4h 39' 29"
2	Richie Porte (AUS)	BMC Racing Team	+ 6"
3	Chris Froome (GBR)	Team Sky	+ 13"
4	Dan Martin (IRL)	Etixx–Quick-Step	+ 21"
5	Julian Alaphilippe (FRA)	Etixx–Quick-Step	+ 24"
6	Wout Poels (NED)	Team Sky	+ 25"
7	Romain Bardet (FRA)	AG2R La Mondiale	+ 29"
8	Adam Yates (GBR)	Orica–GreenEDGE	+ 31"
9	Diego Rosa (ITA)	Astana	+ 37"
10	Jesús Herrada (ESP)	Movistar Team	+ 39"

=== Stage 2 ===
7 June 2016 – Crêches-sur-Saône to Chalmazel-Jeansagnière, 168 km (104 mi)

Stage 2 Results
Rank	Rider	Team	Time
1	Jesús Herrada (ESP)	Movistar Team	4h 13' 43"
2	Tony Gallopin (FRA)	Lotto–Soudal	+ 2"
3	Serge Pauwels (BEL)	Team Dimension Data	+ 2"
4	Fabrice Jeandesboz (FRA)	Direct Énergie	+ 2"
5	Daniel Moreno (ESP)	Movistar Team	+ 2"
6	Bauke Mollema (NED)	Trek–Segafredo	+ 2"
7	Greg Van Avermaet (BEL)	BMC Racing Team	+ 2"
8	Chris Froome (GBR)	Team Sky	+ 2"
9	Valerio Conti (ITA)	Lampre–Merida	+ 2"
10	Joaquim Rodriguez (ESP)	Team Katusha	+ 2"

General Classification after Stage 2
Rank	Rider	Team	Time
1	Alberto Contador (ESP)	Tinkoff	8h 53' 14"
2	Richie Porte (AUS)	BMC Racing Team	+ 6"
3	Chris Froome (GBR)	Team Sky	+ 13"
4	Dan Martin (IRL)	Etixx–Quick-Step	+ 21"
5	Julian Alaphilippe (FRA)	Etixx–Quick-Step	+ 24"
6	Jesús Herrada (ESP)	Movistar Team	+ 27"
7	Adam Yates (GBR)	Orica–GreenEDGE	+ 31"
8	Diego Rosa (ITA)	Astana	+ 37"
9	Daniel Navarro (ESP)	Cofidis	+ 43"
10	Bauke Mollema (NED)	Trek–Segafredo	+ 48"

=== Stage 3 ===
8 June 2016 – Boën-sur-Lignon to Tournon-sur-Rhône, 182 km (113 mi)

Stage 3 Results
Rank	Rider	Team	Time
1	Fabio Aru (ITA)	Astana	4h 19' 54"
2	Alexander Kristoff (NOR)	Team Katusha	+ 2"
3	Niccolo Bonifazio (ITA)	Trek–Segafredo	+ 2"
4	Julian Alaphilippe (FRA)	Etixx–Quick-Step	+ 2"
5	Edvald Boasson Hagen (NOR)	Team Dimension Data	+ 2"
6	Sam Bennett (IRL)	Bora–Argon 18	+ 2"
7	Daryl Impey (RSA)	Orica–GreenEDGE	+ 2"
8	Nacer Bouhanni (FRA)	Cofidis	+ 2"
9	Enrico Gasparotto (ITA)	Wanty–Groupe Gobert	+ 2"
10	Arthur Vichot (FRA)	FDJ	+ 2"

General Classification after Stage 3
Rank	Rider	Team	Time
1	Alberto Contador (ESP)	Tinkoff	13h 13' 10"
2	Richie Porte (AUS)	BMC Racing Team	+ 6"
3	Chris Froome (GBR)	Team Sky	+ 13"
4	Dan Martin (IRL)	Etixx–Quick-Step	+ 21"
5	Julian Alaphilippe (FRA)	Etixx–Quick-Step	+ 24"
6	Jesús Herrada (ESP)	Movistar Team	+ 27"
7	Adam Yates (GBR)	Orica–GreenEDGE	+ 31"
8	Diego Rosa (ITA)	Astana	+ 37"
9	Daniel Navarro (ESP)	Cofidis	+ 43"
10	Bauke Mollema (NED)	Trek–Segafredo	+ 48"

=== Stage 4 ===
9 June 2016 – Tain-l'Hermitage to Belley, 176 km (109 mi)

Stage 4 Results
Rank	Rider	Team	Time
1	Edvald Boasson Hagen (NOR)	Team Dimension Data	4h 39' 26"
2	Julian Alaphilippe (FRA)	Etixx–Quick-Step	s.t.
3	Nacer Bouhanni (FRA)	Cofidis	s.t.
4	Jens Debusschere (BEL)	Lotto–Soudal	s.t.
5	Greg Van Avermaet (BEL)	BMC Racing Team	s.t.
6	Samuel Dumoulin (FRA)	AG2R La Mondiale	s.t.
7	Jens Keukeleire (BEL)	Orica–GreenEDGE	s.t.
8	John Degenkolb (GER)	Team Giant–Alpecin	s.t.
9	Sam Bennett (IRL)	Bora–Argon 18	s.t.
10	Luka Pibernik (SLO)	Lampre–Merida	s.t.

General Classification after Stage 4
Rank	Rider	Team	Time
1	Alberto Contador (ESP)	Tinkoff	17h 52' 45"
2	Chris Froome (GBR)	Team Sky	+ 4"
3	Richie Porte (AUS)	BMC Racing Team	+ 6"
4	Julian Alaphilippe (FRA)	Etixx–Quick-Step	+ 9"
5	Dan Martin (IRL)	Etixx–Quick-Step	+ 12"
6	Jesús Herrada (ESP)	Movistar Team	+ 27"
7	Adam Yates (GBR)	Orica–GreenEDGE	+ 31"
8	Diego Rosa (ITA)	Astana	+ 35"
9	Daniel Navarro (ESP)	Cofidis	+ 43"
10	Bauke Mollema (NED)	Trek–Segafredo	+ 48"

=== Stage 5 ===
10 June 2016 – La Ravoire to Vaujany, 140 km (87 mi)

Stage 5 Results
Rank	Rider	Team	Time
1	Chris Froome (GBR)	Team Sky	3h 32' 20"
2	Richie Porte (AUS)	BMC Racing Team	+ 1"
3	Adam Yates (GBR)	Orica–GreenEDGE	+ 19"
4	Dan Martin (IRL)	Etixx–Quick-Step	+ 19"
5	Alberto Contador (ESP)	Tinkoff	+ 21"
6	Romain Bardet (FRA)	AG2R La Mondiale	+ 25"
7	Pierre Rolland (FRA)	Cannondale	+ 27"
8	Bauke Mollema (NED)	Trek–Segafredo	+ 27"
9	Louis Meintjes (RSA)	Lampre–Merida	+ 27"
10	Julian Alaphilippe (FRA)	Etixx–Quick-Step	+ 27"

General Classification after Stage 5
Rank	Rider	Team	Time
1	Chris Froome (GBR)	Team Sky	21h 24' 59"
2	Richie Porte (AUS)	BMC Racing Team	+ 7"
3	Alberto Contador (ESP)	Tinkoff	+ 27"
4	Dan Martin (IRL)	Etixx–Quick-Step	+ 37"
5	Julian Alaphilippe (FRA)	Etixx–Quick-Step	+ 42"
6	Adam Yates (GBR)	Orica–GreenEDGE	+ 52"
7	Diego Rosa (ITA)	Astana	+ 1' 08"
8	Daniel Navarro (ESP)	Cofidis	+ 1' 16"
9	Bauke Mollema (NED)	Trek–Segafredo	+ 1' 21"
10	Louis Meintjes (RSA)	Lampre–Merida	+ 1' 27"

=== Stage 6 ===
11 June 2016 – La Rochette to Méribel, 141 km (88 mi)

Stage 6 Results
Rank	Rider	Team	Time
1	Thibaut Pinot (FRA)	FDJ	4h 24' 16"
2	Romain Bardet (FRA)	AG2R La Mondiale	s.t.
3	Dan Martin (IRL)	Etixx–Quick-Step	+ 1' 04"
4	Chris Froome (GBR)	Team Sky	+ 1' 07"
5	Louis Meintjes (RSA)	Lampre–Merida	+ 1' 15"
6	Alberto Contador (ESP)	Tinkoff	+ 1' 15"
7	Diego Rosa (ITA)	Astana	+ 1' 17"
8	Adam Yates (GBR)	Orica–GreenEDGE	+ 1' 17"
9	Julian Alaphilippe (FRA)	Etixx–Quick-Step	+ 1' 21"
10	Richie Porte (AUS)	BMC Racing Team	+ 1' 21"

General Classification after Stage 6
Rank	Rider	Team	Time
1	Chris Froome (GBR)	Team Sky	25h 50' 22"
2	Richie Porte (AUS)	BMC Racing Team	+ 21"
3	Romain Bardet (FRA)	AG2R La Mondiale	+ 21"
4	Dan Martin (IRL)	Etixx–Quick-Step	+ 30"
5	Alberto Contador (ESP)	Tinkoff	+ 35"
6	Julian Alaphilippe (FRA)	Etixx–Quick-Step	+ 56"
7	Adam Yates (GBR)	Orica–GreenEDGE	+ 1' 02"
8	Diego Rosa (ITA)	Astana	+ 1' 18"
9	Louis Meintjes (RSA)	Lampre–Merida	+ 1' 35"
10	Thibaut Pinot (FRA)	FDJ	+ 2' 12"

=== Stage 7 ===
12 June 2016 – Pont-de-Claix to SuperDévoluy, 151 km (94 mi)

Stage 7 Results
Rank	Rider	Team	Time
1	Steve Cummings (GBR)	Team Dimension Data	4h 05' 06"
2	Dan Martin (IRL)	Etixx–Quick-Step	+ 3' 58"
3	Romain Bardet (FRA)	AG2R La Mondiale	+ 3' 58"
4	Wout Poels (NED)	Team Sky	+ 3' 58"
5	Adam Yates (GBR)	Orica–GreenEDGE	+ 3' 58"
6	Julian Alaphilippe (FRA)	Etixx–Quick-Step	+ 3' 58"
7	Diego Rosa (ITA)	Astana	+ 3' 58"
8	Louis Meintjes (RSA)	Lampre–Merida	+ 3' 58"
9	Richie Porte (AUS)	BMC Racing Team	+ 4' 03"
10	Chris Froome (GBR)	Team Sky	+ 4' 03"

Final General Classification
Rank	Rider	Team	Time
1	Chris Froome (GBR)	Team Sky	29h 59' 31"
2	Romain Bardet (FRA)	AG2R La Mondiale	+ 12"
3	Dan Martin (IRL)	Etixx–Quick-Step	+ 19"
4	Richie Porte (AUS)	BMC Racing Team	+ 21"
5	Alberto Contador (ESP)	Tinkoff	+ 35"
6	Julian Alaphilippe (FRA)	Etixx–Quick-Step	+ 51"
7	Adam Yates (GBR)	Orica–GreenEDGE	+ 57"
8	Diego Rosa (ITA)	Astana	+ 1' 13"
9	Louis Meintjes (RSA)	Lampre–Merida	+ 1' 30"
10	Pierre Rolland (FRA)	Cannondale	+ 2' 43"

== Classification leadership ==
Mountains classification points
Category	1st	2nd	3rd	4th	5th	6th
First	10	8	6	4	2	1
Second	5	3	2	1		
Third	2	1				
Fourth	1					

In the Critérium du Dauphiné, four different jerseys were awarded. The most important was the general classification, which was calculated by adding each rider's finishing times on each stage. The rider with the least accumulated time is the race leader, identified by a yellow jersey with a blue bar; the winner of this classification was considered the winner of the race.

Additionally, there was a points classification, which awarded a green jersey. In the classification, cyclists received points for finishing in the top 10 in a stage. Points towards the classification could also be achieved at each of the intermediate sprints; these points were given to the top three riders through the line with 5 points for first, 3 for second, and 1 point for third.

There was also a mountains classification, the leadership of which was marked by a red jersey with white polka dots. In the mountains classification, points towards the classification were won by reaching the top of a climb before other cyclists. Each climb was categorised as either first, second, third, or fourth-category, with more points available for the higher-categorised climbs. First-category climbs awarded the most points; the first six riders were able to accrue points, compared with the first four on second-category climbs, the first two on third-category and only the first for fourth-category.

The fourth jersey represented the young rider classification, marked by a white jersey. This was decided the same way as the general classification, but only riders born on or after 1 January 1991 were eligible to be ranked in the classification. There was also a team classification, in which the times of the best three cyclists per team on each stage were added together; the leading team at the end of the race was the team with the lowest total time.

Classification leadership by stage
Stage	Winner	General classification	Points classification	Mountains classification	Young rider classification	Team classification
P	Alberto Contador	Alberto Contador	Alberto Contador	Alberto Contador	Julian Alaphilippe	Team Sky
1	Nacer Bouhanni	Alberto Contador	Nacer Bouhanni	Alberto Contador	Julian Alaphilippe	Team Sky
2	Jesús Herrada	Alberto Contador	Nacer Bouhanni	Alberto Contador	Julian Alaphilippe	Team Sky
3	Fabio Aru	Alberto Contador	Nacer Bouhanni	Alberto Contador	Julian Alaphilippe	Team Sky
4	Edvald Boasson Hagen	Alberto Contador	Edvald Boasson Hagen	Alberto Contador	Julian Alaphilippe	Team Sky
5	Chris Froome	Chris Froome	Edvald Boasson Hagen	Daniel Teklehaimanot	Julian Alaphilippe	Team Sky
6	Thibaut Pinot	Chris Froome	Edvald Boasson Hagen	Thibaut Pinot	Julian Alaphilippe	Team Sky
7	Steve Cummings	Chris Froome	Edvald Boasson Hagen	Daniel Teklehaimanot	Julian Alaphilippe	Team Sky
Final		Chris Froome	Edvald Boasson Hagen	Daniel Teklehaimanot	Julian Alaphilippe	Team Sky

Notes

- In stage 1, Richie Porte, who was second in the points classification, wore the green jersey, because Alberto Contador (in first place) wore the yellow jersey as leader of the general classification during that stage. Chris Froome, who was third in the mountains classification, wore the polka dot jersey, because Alberto Contador (in first place) wore the yellow jersey and Richie Porte (in second place) wore the green jersey during that stage.
- In stages 2–5, Richie Porte, who was second in the mountains classification, wore the polka dot jersey, because Alberto Contador (in first place) wore the yellow jersey as leader of the general classification during that stage.

== Final standings ==
Legend
A yellow jersey with a blue band.	Denotes the leader of the general classification	A green jersey.	Denotes the leader of the points classification
A white jersey with red polka dots.	Denotes the leader of the mountains classification	A white jersey.	Denotes the leader of the young rider classification
A white jersey with a yellow number bib.	Denotes the leader of the team classification		

=== General classification ===
Final general classification (1–10)
Rank	Rider	Team	Time
1	Chris Froome (GBR)	Team Sky	29h 59' 31"
2	Romain Bardet (FRA)	AG2R La Mondiale	+ 12"
3	Dan Martin (IRL)	Etixx–Quick-Step	+ 19"
4	Richie Porte (AUS)	BMC Racing Team	+ 21"
5	Alberto Contador (ESP)	Tinkoff	+ 35"
6	Julian Alaphilippe (FRA)	Etixx–Quick-Step	+ 51"
7	Adam Yates (GBR)	Orica–GreenEDGE	+ 57"
8	Diego Rosa (ITA)	Astana	+ 1' 13"
9	Louis Meintjes (RSA)	Lampre–Merida	+ 1' 30"
10	Pierre Rolland (FRA)	Cannondale	+ 2' 43"

=== Points classification ===
Final points classification (1–10)
Rank	Rider	Team	Points
1	Edvald Boasson Hagen (NOR)	Team Dimension Data	59
2	Julian Alaphilippe (FRA)	Etixx–Quick-Step	54
3	Sam Bennett (IRL)	Bora–Argon 18	42
4	Dan Martin (IRL)	Etixx–Quick-Step	38
5	Chris Froome (GBR)	Team Sky	37
6	Romain Bardet (FRA)	AG2R La Mondiale	31
7	Richie Porte (AUS)	BMC Racing Team	27
8	Alberto Contador (ESP)	Tinkoff	26
9	Fabio Aru (ITA)	Astana	25
10	Adam Yates (GBR)	Orica–GreenEDGE	22

=== Mountains classification ===
Final mountains classification (1–10)
Rank	Rider	Team	Points
1	Daniel Teklehaimanot (ERI)	MTN–Qhubeka	44
2	Tsgabu Grmay (ETH)	Lampre–Merida	39
3	Thibaut Pinot (FRA)	FDJ	37
4	Steve Cummings (GBR)	Team Dimension Data	22
5	Romain Bardet (FRA)	AG2R La Mondiale	22
6	Chris Froome (GBR)	Team Sky	21
7	Mikaël Cherel (FRA)	AG2R La Mondiale	16
8	Serge Pauwels (BEL)	Team Dimension Data	14
9	Richie Porte (AUS)	BMC Racing Team	15
10	Dan Martin (IRL)	Etixx–Quick-Step	14

=== Young rider classification ===
Final young rider classification (1–10)
Rank	Rider	Team	Time
1	Julian Alaphilippe (FRA)	Etixx–Quick-Step	30h 00' 22"
2	Adam Yates (GBR)	Orica–GreenEDGE	+ 6"
3	Louis Meintjes (RSA)	Lampre–Merida	+ 39"
4	Emanuel Buchmann (GER)	Bora–Argon 18	+ 7' 22"
5	Dayer Quintana (COL)	Movistar Team	+ 19' 37"
6	Guillaume Martin (FRA)	Wanty–Groupe Gobert	+ 20' 12"
7	Laurens De Plus (BEL)	Etixx–Quick-Step	+ 21' 59"
8	Valerio Conti (ITA)	Lampre–Merida	+ 22' 08"
9	Jack Haig (AUS)	Orica–GreenEDGE	+ 34' 04"
10	Tsgabu Grmay (ETH)	Lampre–Merida	+ 45' 04"

=== Team classification ===
Final team classification (1–10)
Rank	Team	Time
1	Team Sky	90h 04' 20"
2	BMC Racing Team	+ 13' 47"
3	AG2R La Mondiale	+ 14' 06"
4	Etixx–Quick-Step	+ 15' 36"
5	Tinkoff	+ 20' 38"
6	Astana	+ 40' 20"
7	Movistar Team	+ 46' 53"
8	Orica–GreenEDGE	+ 51' 32"
9	Cannondale	+ 53' 15"
10	Lampre–Merida	+ 59' 44"
