= La Cluse =

- Part of Dévoluy
- Location of La Cluse
- Location within France Location within Provence-Alpes-Côte d'Azur
- Coordinates: 44°38′25″N 5°50′56″E
- Country: France
- Region: Provence-Alpes-Côte d'Azur
- Department: Hautes-Alpes
- Arrondissement: Gap
- Canton: Saint-Étienne-en-Dévoluy
- Commune: Dévoluy
- Area^{1}: 40.15 km^{2} (15.50 sq mi)
- Elevation: 1,252 m (4,108 ft)
- Highest elevation: 2,683 m (8,802 ft)
- Lowest elevation: 1,027 m (3,369 ft)
- Population (2019): 52
  - Density: 1.3/km^{2} (3.4/sq mi)
- Time zone: UTC+01:00 (CET)
  - Summer (DST): UTC+02:00 (CEST)
- Postal code: 05250
- ^{1} French Land Register data, which excludes lakes, ponds, glaciers > 1 km^{2} (0.386 sq mi or 247 acres) and river estuaries.

La Cluse (French pronunciation: [la klyz]; Vivaro-Alpine: La Clusa) is a former commune in the Hautes-Alpes department in southeastern France. On 1 January 2013, Agnières-en-Dévoluy, La Cluse, Saint-Disdier, and Saint-Étienne-en-Dévoluy amalgamated into the new commune of Dévoluy.

== Population ==
Historical population
Year	Pop.	±% p.a.
2006	53	—
2010	53	+0.00%
2019	52	−0.21%
Source: INSEE

== See also ==
- Communes of the Hautes-Alpes department
