= Montmaur, Hautes-Alpes =

Montmaur
- Commune
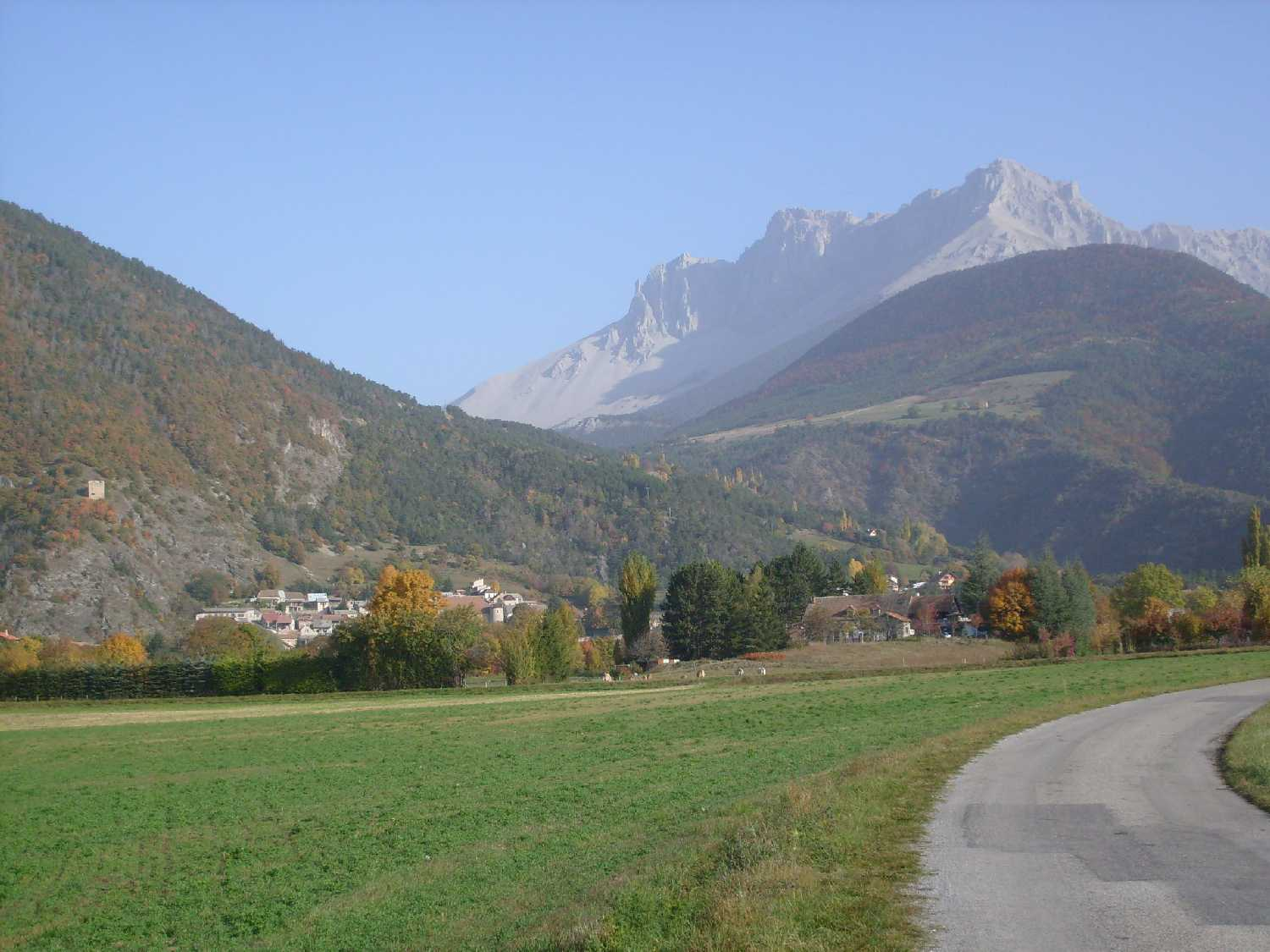
- An overall view of Montmaur

- Coat of arms
- Location of Montmaur
- Location within France Location within Provence-Alpes-Côte d'Azur
- Coordinates: 44°34′19″N 5°52′29″E
- Country: France
- Region: Provence-Alpes-Côte d'Azur
- Department: Hautes-Alpes
- Arrondissement: Gap
- Canton: Veynes

Government
  - Mayor (2026–32): Georges Lesbros
- Area^{1}: 48.77 km^{2} (18.83 sq mi)
- Elevation: 873 m (2,864 ft)
- Highest elevation: 2,680 m (8,790 ft)
- Lowest elevation: 849 m (2,785 ft)
- Population (2023): 532
  - Density: 10.9/km^{2} (28.3/sq mi)
- Time zone: UTC+01:00 (CET)
  - Summer (DST): UTC+02:00 (CEST)
- INSEE/Postal code: 05087 /05400
- ^{1} French Land Register data, which excludes lakes, ponds, glaciers > 1 km^{2} (0.386 sq mi or 247 acres) and river estuaries.

Montmaur (French pronunciation: [mɔ̃mɔʁ]) is a commune in the Hautes-Alpes department in southeastern France.

== Population ==
Historical population
Year	Pop.	±% p.a.
1968	277	—
1975	229	−2.68%
1982	282	+3.02%
1990	311	+1.23%
1999	423	+3.48%
2007	505	+2.24%
2012	526	+0.82%
2017	512	−0.54%
2023	532	+0.64%
Source: INSEE

== See also ==
- Communes of the Hautes-Alpes department
