= Furmeyer =

- Commune
- Coat of arms
- Location of Furmeyer
- Location within France Location within Provence-Alpes-Côte d'Azur
- Coordinates: 44°32′26″N 5°52′24″E
- Country: France
- Region: Provence-Alpes-Côte d'Azur
- Department: Hautes-Alpes
- Arrondissement: Gap
- Canton: Veynes

Government
  - Mayor (2026–32): Michel Ricou-Charles
- Area^{1}: 14.27 km^{2} (5.51 sq mi)
- Elevation: 915 m (3,002 ft)
- Highest elevation: 1,661 m (5,449 ft)
- Lowest elevation: 817 m (2,680 ft)
- Population (2023): 169
  - Density: 11.8/km^{2} (30.7/sq mi)
- Time zone: UTC+01:00 (CET)
  - Summer (DST): UTC+02:00 (CEST)
- INSEE/Postal code: 05060 /05400
- ^{1} French Land Register data, which excludes lakes, ponds, glaciers > 1 km^{2} (0.386 sq mi or 247 acres) and river estuaries.

Furmeyer (French pronunciation: [fyʁmɛje]; Occitan: Furmeier) is a commune in the Hautes-Alpes department in southeastern France.

== Population ==
Historical population
Year	Pop.	±% p.a.
1968	110	—
1975	110	+0.00%
1982	125	+1.84%
1990	140	+1.43%
1999	154	+1.06%
2007	147	−0.58%
2012	141	−0.83%
2017	163	+2.94%
2023	169	+0.60%
Source: INSEE

== See also ==
- Communes of the Hautes-Alpes department
