= Agnières-en-Dévoluy =

- Part of Dévoluy
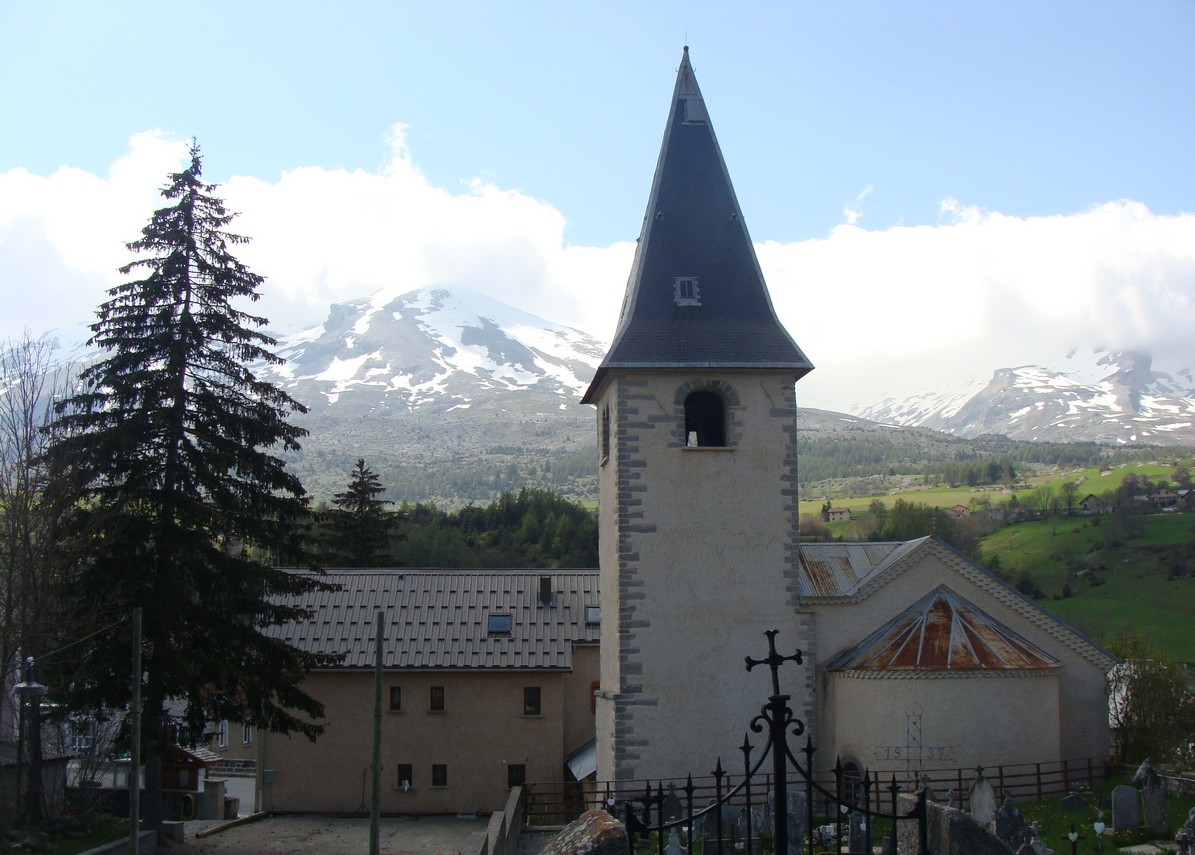
- The church of Agnières-en-Dévoluy

- Coat of arms
- Location of Agnières-en-Dévoluy
- Location within France Location within Provence-Alpes-Côte d'Azur
- Coordinates: 44°41′42″N 5°52′56″E
- Country: France
- Region: Provence-Alpes-Côte d'Azur
- Department: Hautes-Alpes
- Arrondissement: Gap
- Canton: Veynes
- Commune: Dévoluy
- Area^{1}: 32.46 km^{2} (12.53 sq mi)
- Elevation: 1,270 m (4,170 ft)
- Highest elevation: 2,597 m (8,520 ft)
- Lowest elevation: 1,114 m (3,655 ft)
- Population (2019): 276
  - Density: 8.50/km^{2} (22.0/sq mi)
- Time zone: UTC+01:00 (CET)
  - Summer (DST): UTC+02:00 (CEST)
- Postal code: 05250
- ^{1} French Land Register data, which excludes lakes, ponds, glaciers > 1 km^{2} (0.386 sq mi or 247 acres) and river estuaries.

Agnières-en-Dévoluy (French pronunciation: [aɲɛʁ ɑ̃ devɔlɥi], lit. 'Agnières in Dévoluy'; Vivaro-Alpine: Anhera de Devolui) is a former commune of the Hautes-Alpes department in southeastern France. Mountainous, to the west is Rocher Rond. On 1 January 2013, Agnières-en-Dévoluy, La Cluse, Saint-Disdier, and Saint-Étienne-en-Dévoluy amalgamated into the new commune of Dévoluy.

== Population ==
Historical population
Year	Pop.	±% p.a.
2006	259	—
2010	270	+1.05%
2019	276	+0.24%
Source: INSEE

== See also ==
- Communes of the Hautes-Alpes department
