= La Roche-des-Arnauds =

- Commune
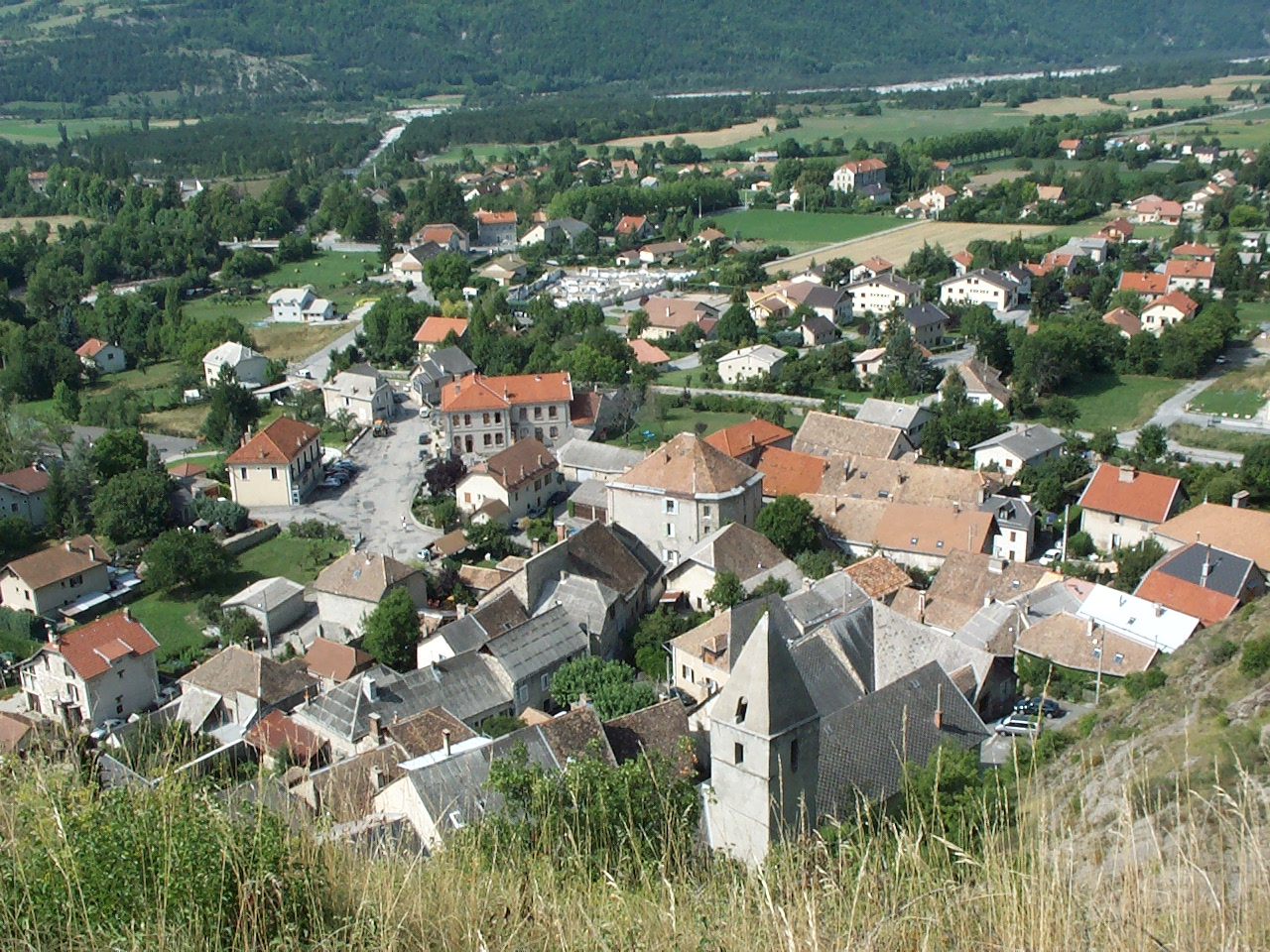
- An overhead view of La Roche-des-Arnauds, from the nearby hillside

- Coat of arms
- Location of La Roche-des-Arnauds
- Location within France Location within Provence-Alpes-Côte d'Azur
- Coordinates: 44°33′50″N 5°57′25″E
- Country: France
- Region: Provence-Alpes-Côte d'Azur
- Department: Hautes-Alpes
- Arrondissement: Gap
- Canton: Veynes

Government
  - Mayor (2026–32): Fabrice Roux
- Area^{1}: 53.75 km^{2} (20.75 sq mi)
- Elevation: 933 m (3,061 ft)
- Highest elevation: 2,709 m (8,888 ft)
- Lowest elevation: 885 m (2,904 ft)
- Population (2023): 1,685
  - Density: 31.35/km^{2} (81.19/sq mi)
- Time zone: UTC+01:00 (CET)
  - Summer (DST): UTC+02:00 (CEST)
- INSEE/Postal code: 05123 /05400
- ^{1} French Land Register data, which excludes lakes, ponds, glaciers > 1 km^{2} (0.386 sq mi or 247 acres) and river estuaries.

La Roche-des-Arnauds (French pronunciation: [la ʁɔʃ dez‿aʁno]; Occitan: La Ròca deis Arnauds) is a commune in the Hautes-Alpes department in southeastern France.

== Population ==
Historical population
Year	Pop.	±% p.a.
1968	607	—
1975	678	+1.59%
1982	763	+1.70%
1990	845	+1.28%
1999	953	+1.35%
2007	1,298	+3.94%
2012	1,449	+2.23%
2017	1,521	+0.97%
2023	1,685	+1.72%
Source: INSEE

== See also ==
- Communes of the Hautes-Alpes department
