= Rocher Rond =

Summit in the Dévoluy massif of the French Alps

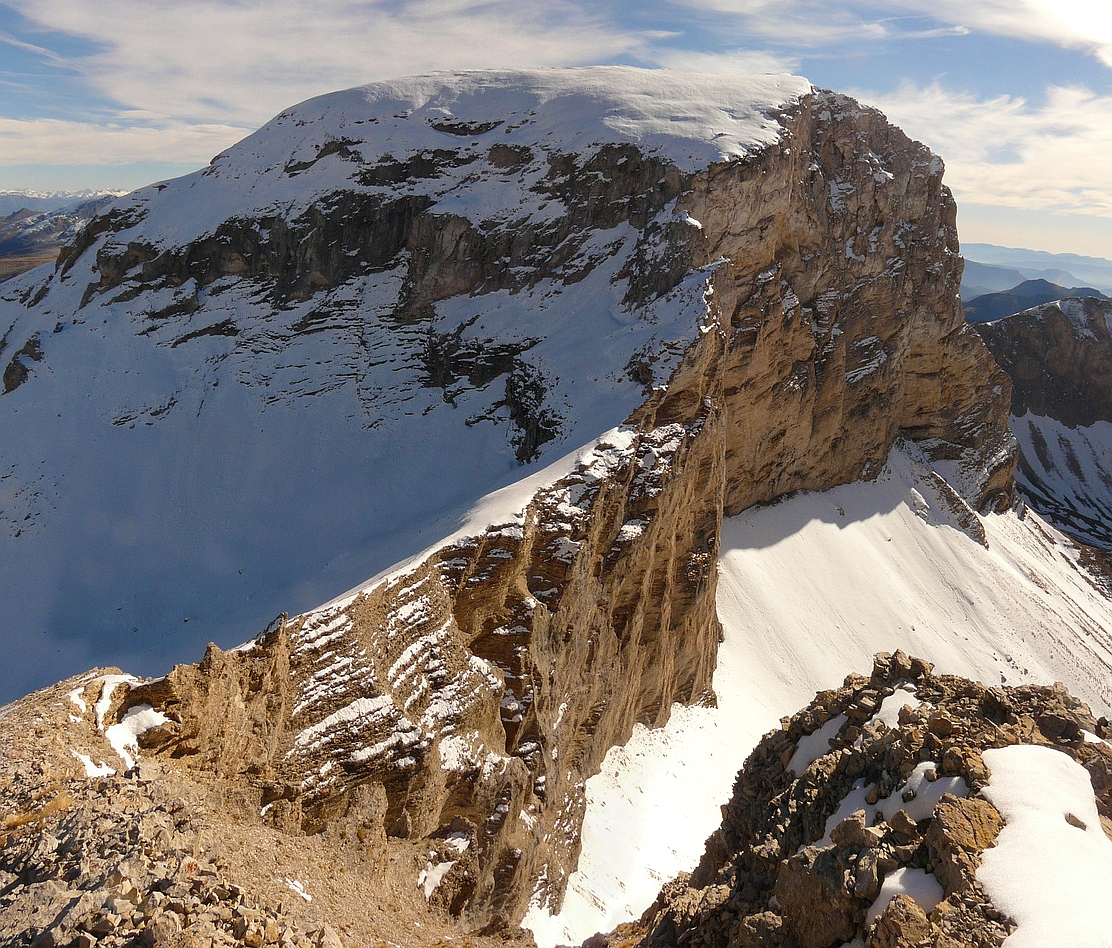

Highest point
- Elevation: 2,453 m (8,048 ft)
- Coordinates: 44°41′48″N 05°49′38″E

Geography
- Location within France
- Location: Drôme /Hautes-Alpes, France
- Parent range: Dévoluy massif

Climbing
- Easiest route: Hike

The Rocher Rond (round rock) is a summit in the Dévoluy massif of the French Alps. It is the highest point of the Vercors Regional Natural Park, although it is not part of the Vercors massif, and also the highest point in the department of Drôme. It has an elevation of 2453 metres, and an isolation of 8.77 km. It is the 14th highest French department highpoint.

== Location ==
Rocher Rond lies in the foothills of the Alps, straddling the communes of Lus-la-Croix-Haute (in the department of Drôme) and Agnières-en-Dévoluy (in the department of Hautes-Alpes). It is preceded to the north (north to south) by the Grand Ferrand (big Ferrand, 2761 metres), and the Tête des Vautes (Head of Vautes, 2188 metres), which is connected to the main body of the mountain by the Col du Charnier (Col of the House of Death, lit. final resting place of the bodies or bones of the dead, 2103 metres), and the Plate Longue (long plateau or plate, 2383 metres), which is a pyramid of bare rock and generally regarded as a sub-summit of Rocher Rond. The east slope is snow-covered in winter, and is popular with skiers. There ridges leading off the summit to the north, north-east, and south.

== Geology ==
The Rocher Rond is mainly composed of limestone. The western slope is almost exclusively exposed rock and cliffs, overlooking the Lac du Lauzon, and the summit massif is of the Santonian strata, whilst some of the surrounding mountains are of another Cretaceous strata, the Barremian. However, this lies on top of another rock strata, of the Neocomian era, which is exposed below the cliffs in a concave slope descending to the shore of the Lac du Lauzon.
