= Châteauneuf-d'Oze =

Châteauneuf-d'Oze Chasteunòu d'Auza (Occitan)
- Commune
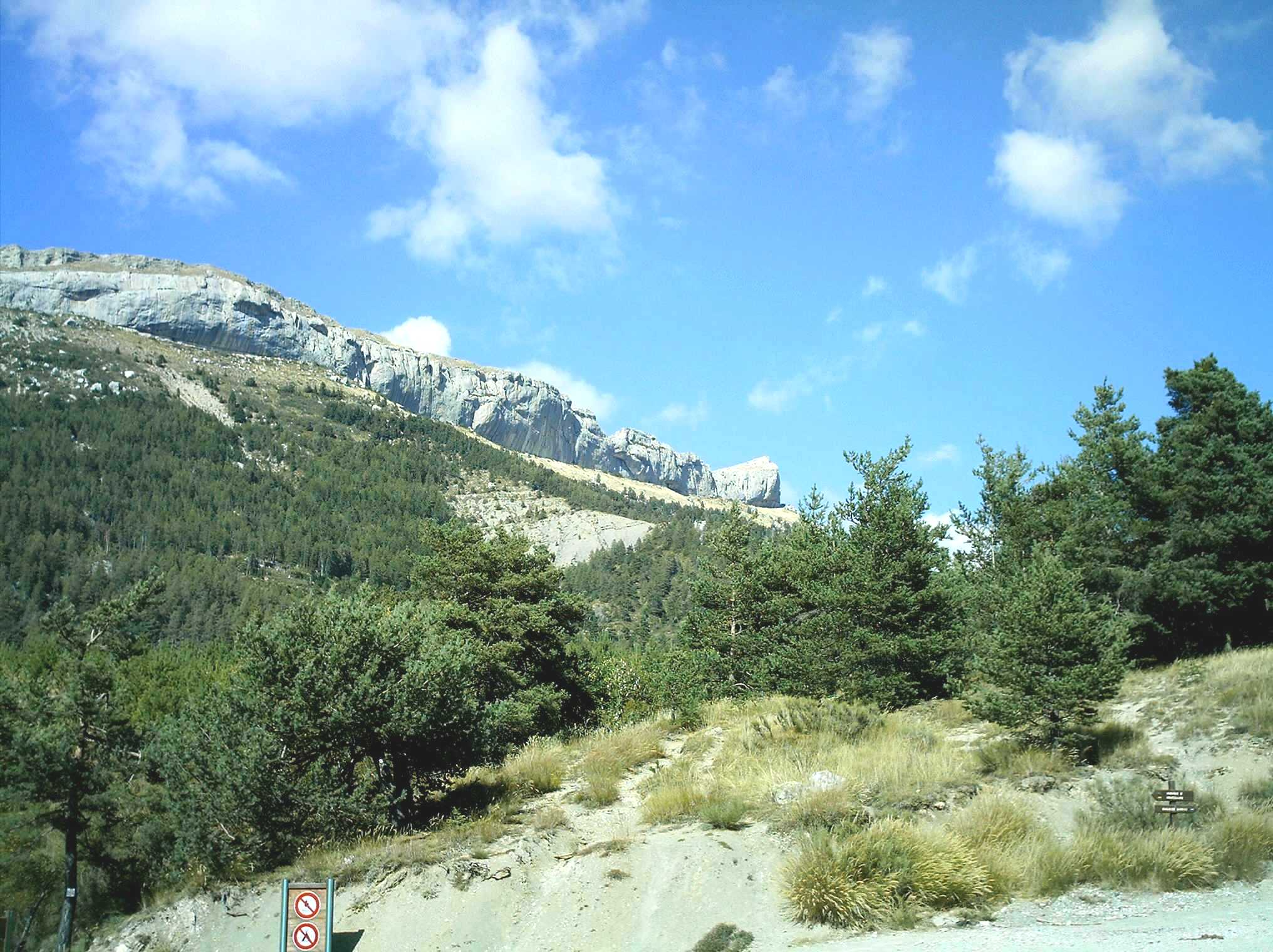
- A view of the south side of the Corniche de Céüse from the Col de Guérins
- Location of Châteauneuf-d'Oze
- Location within France Location within Provence-Alpes-Côte d'Azur
- Coordinates: 44°30′45″N 5°51′55″E
- Country: France
- Region: Provence-Alpes-Côte d'Azur
- Department: Hautes-Alpes
- Arrondissement: Gap
- Canton: Veynes

Government
  - Mayor (2026–32): Monique Barthélemy
- Area^{1}: 26.23 km^{2} (10.13 sq mi)
- Elevation: 963 m (3,159 ft)
- Highest elevation: 2,016 m (6,614 ft)
- Lowest elevation: 861 m (2,825 ft)
- Population (2023): 30
  - Density: 1.1/km^{2} (3.0/sq mi)
- Time zone: UTC+01:00 (CET)
  - Summer (DST): UTC+02:00 (CEST)
- INSEE/Postal code: 05035 /05400
- ^{1} French Land Register data, which excludes lakes, ponds, glaciers > 1 km^{2} (0.386 sq mi or 247 acres) and river estuaries.

Châteauneuf-d'Oze (French: [ʃɑtonœf doz]; Occitan: Chasteunòu d'Auza) is a commune in the Hautes-Alpes department in southeastern France.

== Population ==
Historical population
Year	Pop.	±% p.a.
1968	28	—
1975	18	−6.12%
1982	26	+5.39%
1990	24	−1.00%
1999	14	−5.81%
2007	28	+9.05%
2012	25	−2.24%
2017	28	+2.29%
2023	30	+1.16%
Source: INSEE

== See also ==
- Communes of the Hautes-Alpes department
