= Dévoluy =

- Commune
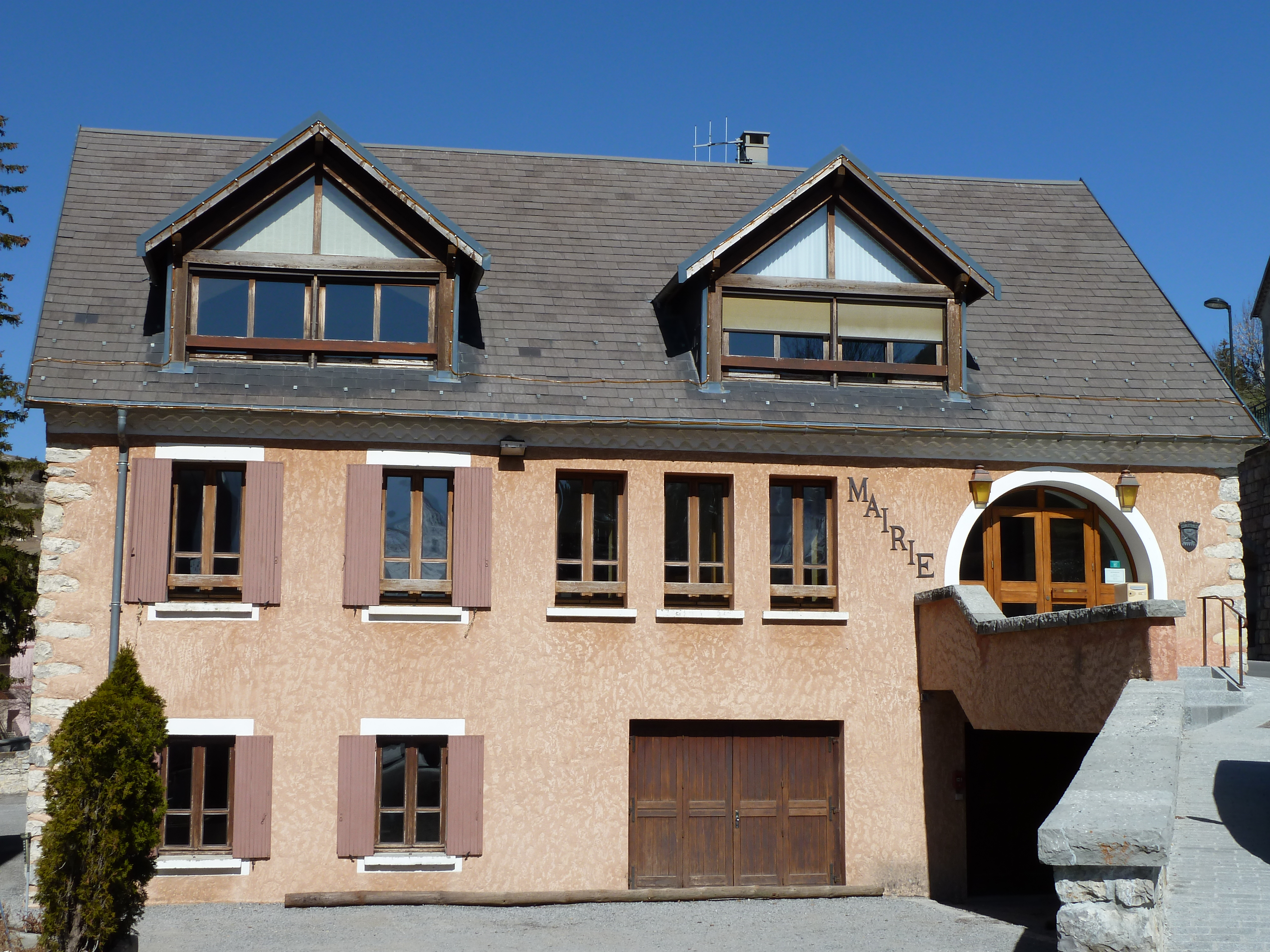
- The town hall of Le Dévoluy
- Location of Dévoluy
- Location within France Location within Provence-Alpes-Côte d'Azur
- Coordinates: 44°41′36″N 5°56′31″E
- Country: France
- Region: Provence-Alpes-Côte d'Azur
- Department: Hautes-Alpes
- Arrondissement: Gap
- Canton: Veynes
- Intercommunality: Buëch Dévoluy

Government
  - Mayor (2026–32): Alexandra Butel
- Area^{1}: 186.37 km^{2} (71.96 sq mi)
- Highest elevation: 2,755 m (9,039 ft)
- Lowest elevation: 950 m (3,120 ft)
- Population (2023): 932
  - Density: 5.00/km^{2} (13.0/sq mi)
- Time zone: UTC+01:00 (CET)
  - Summer (DST): UTC+02:00 (CEST)
- INSEE/Postal code: 05139 /05250
- ^{1} French Land Register data, which excludes lakes, ponds, glaciers > 1 km^{2} (0.386 sq mi or 247 acres) and river estuaries.

Dévoluy (French pronunciation: [devɔlɥi]) is a commune in the Hautes-Alpes department in Provence-Alpes-Côte d'Azur region in southeastern France. It is the result of the merger, on 1 January 2013, of the four communes of Agnières-en-Dévoluy, La Cluse, Saint-Disdier, and Saint-Étienne-en-Dévoluy.

SuperDévoluy, a ski resort, is part of the commune.

== Population ==
Populations of the area corresponding with the commune of Dévoluy at 1 January 2025. Data for years before 2013 refer to the sum of the populations of the former communes Agnières-en-Dévoluy, La Cluse, Saint-Disdier, and Saint-Étienne-en-Dévoluy.

Historical population

| Year | Pop. | ±% p.a. |
|---|---|---|
| 1793 | 2,230 | — |
| 1861 | 2,054 | −0.12% |
| 1911 | 1,795 | −0.27% |
| 1962 | 909 | −1.33% |
| 1968 | 869 | −0.75% |
| 1975 | 885 | +0.26% |
| 1982 | 910 | +0.40% |

| Year | Pop. | ±% p.a. |
|---|---|---|
| 1990 | 929 | +0.26% |
| 1999 | 945 | +0.19% |
| 2007 | 1,032 | +1.11% |
| 2012 | 1,013 | −0.37% |
| 2017 | 966 | −0.95% |
| 2023 | 932 | −0.60% |

Source: EHESS and INSEE

== Geography ==
=== Location ===
Saint-Étienne-en-Dévoluy is located 28 km (17 mi) northeast of the railroad hub of Veynes.

At 18,637 hectares, Dévoluy is the second-largest commune in the area, right behind Névache.

=== Terrain and Geology ===
The town covers the entirety of the Dévoluy range.

Dévoluy is known for its numerous underground cavities, the chourums, and its suitability for speleology.

The European larch, or common larch (Larix decidua) is particularly present in the commune.

=== Climate ===
Climate data for Saint-Étienne-en-Dévoluy (1991–2020 averages): elevation 1300m
| Month | Jan | Feb | Mar | Apr | May | Jun | Jul | Aug | Sep | Oct | Nov | Dec | Year |
|---|---|---|---|---|---|---|---|---|---|---|---|---|---|
| Record high °C (°F) | 15.1 (59.2) | 18.2 (64.8) | 22.0 (71.6) | 24.1 (75.4) | 29.8 (85.6) | 33.5 (92.3) | 34.4 (93.9) | 34.3 (93.7) | 30.0 (86.0) | 26.3 (79.3) | 20.0 (68.0) | 15.3 (59.5) | 34.4 (93.9) |
| Mean daily maximum °C (°F) | 3.5 (38.3) | 4.7 (40.5) | 9.0 (48.2) | 12.4 (54.3) | 16.8 (62.2) | 21.3 (70.3) | 24.1 (75.4) | 23.8 (74.8) | 18.7 (65.7) | 13.9 (57.0) | 7.5 (45.5) | 4.0 (39.2) | 13.3 (56.0) |
| Daily mean °C (°F) | −1.5 (29.3) | −0.9 (30.4) | 2.9 (37.2) | 6.1 (43.0) | 10.5 (50.9) | 14.2 (57.6) | 16.4 (61.5) | 16.2 (61.2) | 12.1 (53.8) | 8.3 (46.9) | 2.9 (37.2) | −0.5 (31.1) | 7.2 (45.0) |
| Mean daily minimum °C (°F) | −6.5 (20.3) | −6.6 (20.1) | −3.1 (26.4) | −0.1 (31.8) | 4.1 (39.4) | 7.2 (45.0) | 8.7 (47.7) | 8.7 (47.7) | 5.5 (41.9) | 2.6 (36.7) | −1.7 (28.9) | −5.1 (22.8) | 1.1 (34.1) |
| Record low °C (°F) | −25 (−13) | −25.1 (−13.2) | −19.5 (−3.1) | −11 (12) | −5 (23) | −2.7 (27.1) | 1.0 (33.8) | −0.3 (31.5) | −4.5 (23.9) | −9.2 (15.4) | −20 (−4) | −19.9 (−3.8) | −25.1 (−13.2) |
| Average precipitation mm (inches) | 84.3 (3.32) | 58.7 (2.31) | 71.0 (2.80) | 93.8 (3.69) | 95.0 (3.74) | 78.3 (3.08) | 58.9 (2.32) | 68.9 (2.71) | 95.5 (3.76) | 138.1 (5.44) | 156.7 (6.17) | 101.4 (3.99) | 1,100.6 (43.33) |
Source: Météo-France

== See also ==
- Communes of the Hautes-Alpes department
