= Saint-Disdier =

- Part of Dévoluy
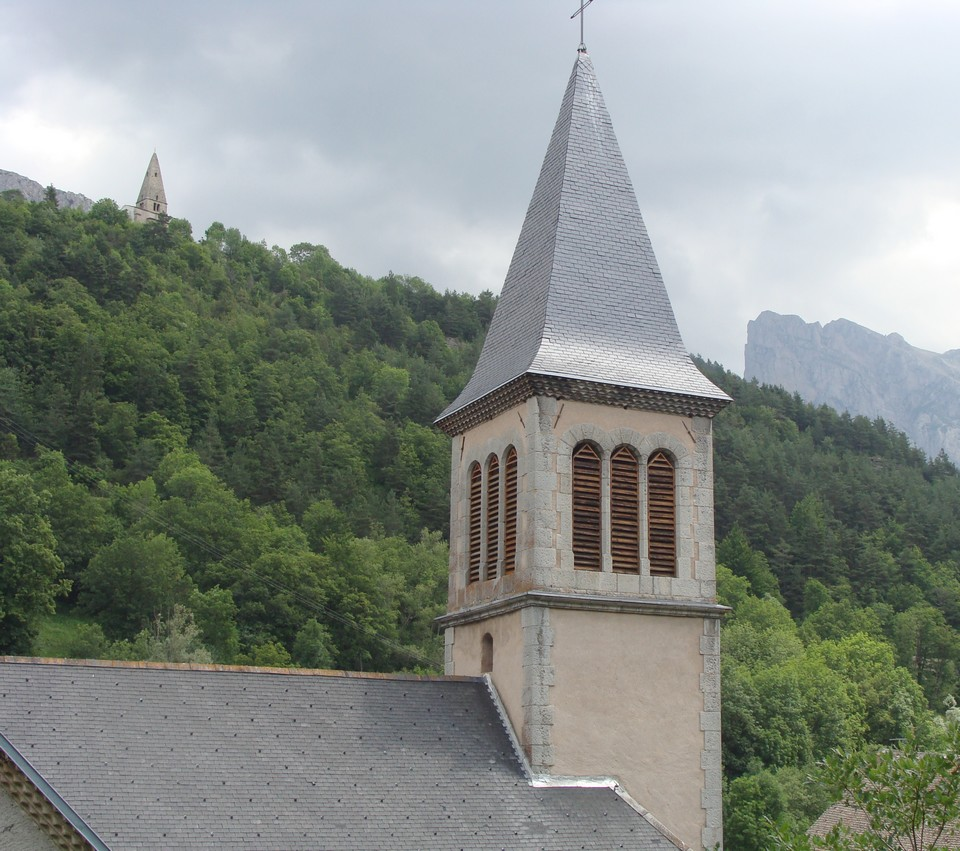
- Saint-Disdier, with the parish church in the foreground, and the "Mother Church" on the hill

- Coat of arms
- Location of Saint-Disdier
- Location within France Location within Provence-Alpes-Côte d'Azur
- Coordinates: 44°44′09″N 5°53′52″E
- Country: France
- Region: Provence-Alpes-Côte d'Azur
- Department: Hautes-Alpes
- Arrondissement: Gap
- Canton: Saint-Étienne-en-Dévoluy
- Commune: Dévoluy
- Area^{1}: 45.89 km^{2} (17.72 sq mi)
- Elevation: 1,040 m (3,410 ft)
- Highest elevation: 2,755 m (9,039 ft)
- Lowest elevation: 950 m (3,120 ft)
- Population (2019): 112
  - Density: 2.44/km^{2} (6.32/sq mi)
- Time zone: UTC+01:00 (CET)
  - Summer (DST): UTC+02:00 (CEST)
- Postal code: 05250
- ^{1} French Land Register data, which excludes lakes, ponds, glaciers > 1 km^{2} (0.386 sq mi or 247 acres) and river estuaries.

Saint-Disdier (Vivaro-Alpine: Sant Disdier) is a former commune in the Hautes-Alpes department in southeastern France. On 1 January 2013, Agnières-en-Dévoluy, La Cluse, Saint-Disdier, and Saint-Étienne-en-Dévoluy amalgamated into the new commune of Dévoluy.

== Population ==
Historical population
Year	Pop.	±% p.a.
2006	135	—
2010	136	+0.18%
2019	112	−2.13%
Source: INSEE

== See also ==
- Communes of the Hautes-Alpes department
