= SuperDévoluy =

Ski resort in France

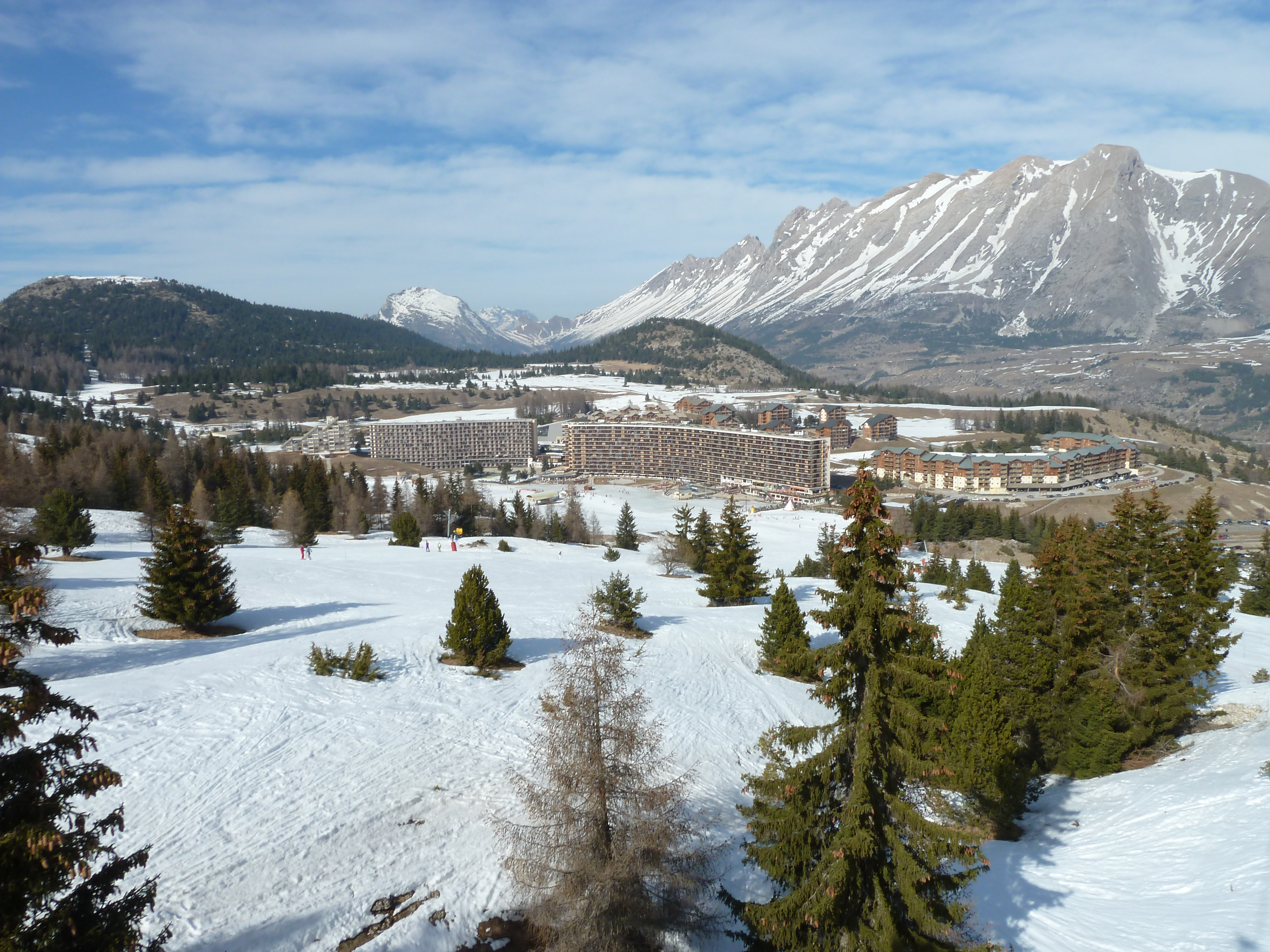
- A general view of SuperDévoluy

- Location within Alps
- Location: Dévoluy
- Nearest city: Grenoble
- Coordinates: 44.6768°N 5.9278°E
- Top elevation: 2,500 m (8,200 ft)
- Base elevation: 1,500 m (4,900 ft)
- Trails: 55
- Total length: 100 km (62 mi)
- Lift system: 23
- Website: www.ledevoluy.com

SuperDévoluy (Superdévoluy - La Joue du Loup) is a ski resort in the commune of Dévoluy in the French Alps. It is located in the "Alpes du Sud", French department in the Provence Alpes Cotes d’Azur (PACA) region. With the other ski resort La Joue du Loup, there are 100 km of ski pistes, with 5 black pistes.

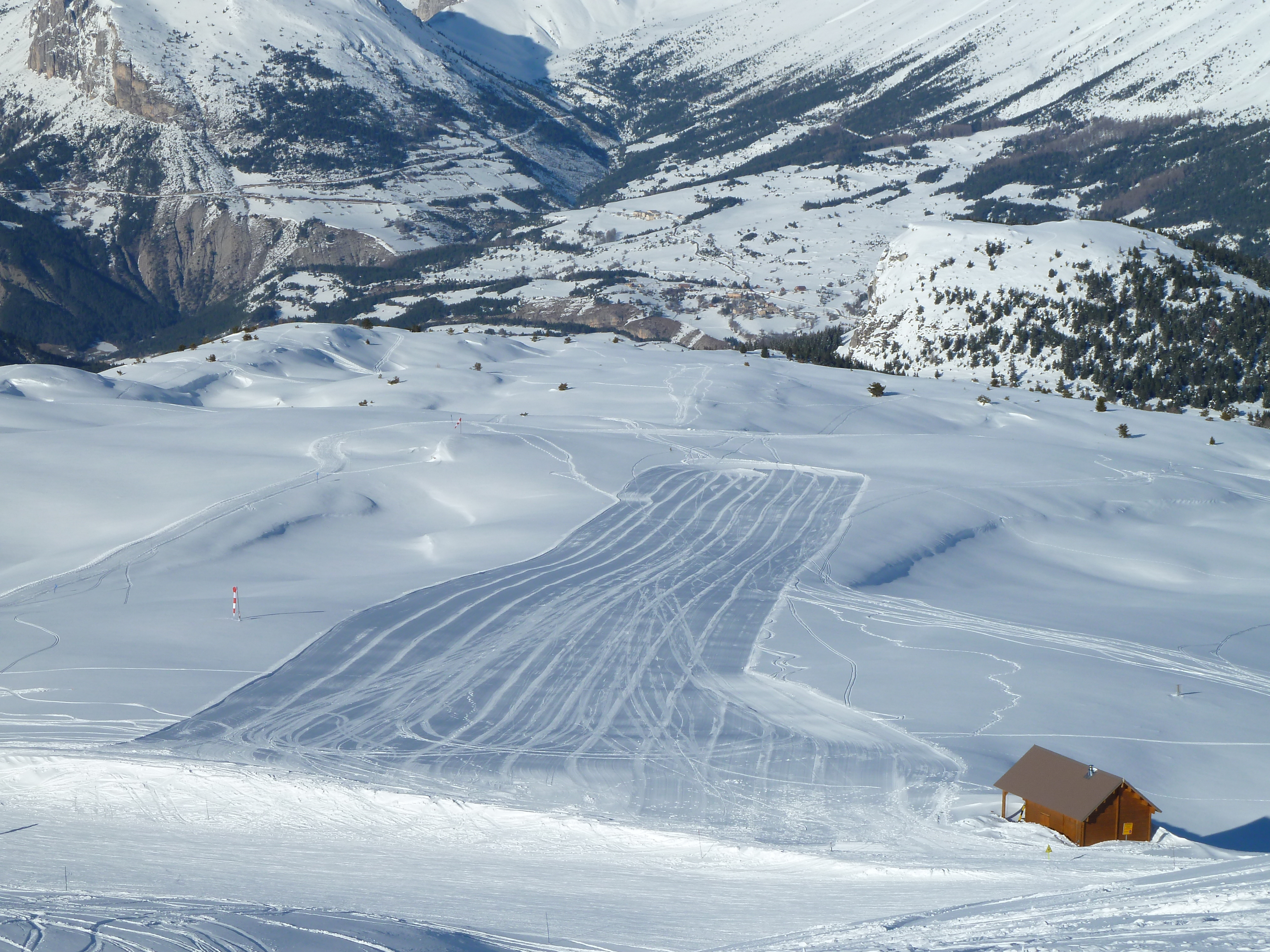
Ski resort from La festoure

The ski resort was built in 1966 in the frame of the French “snow plan” decided in 1964. There is a big activity of pastoralism in the Devoluy. In the village of Saint-Étienne-en-Dévoluy, there are 7 family sheep farms with more than 300 sheep each to discover in the winter.

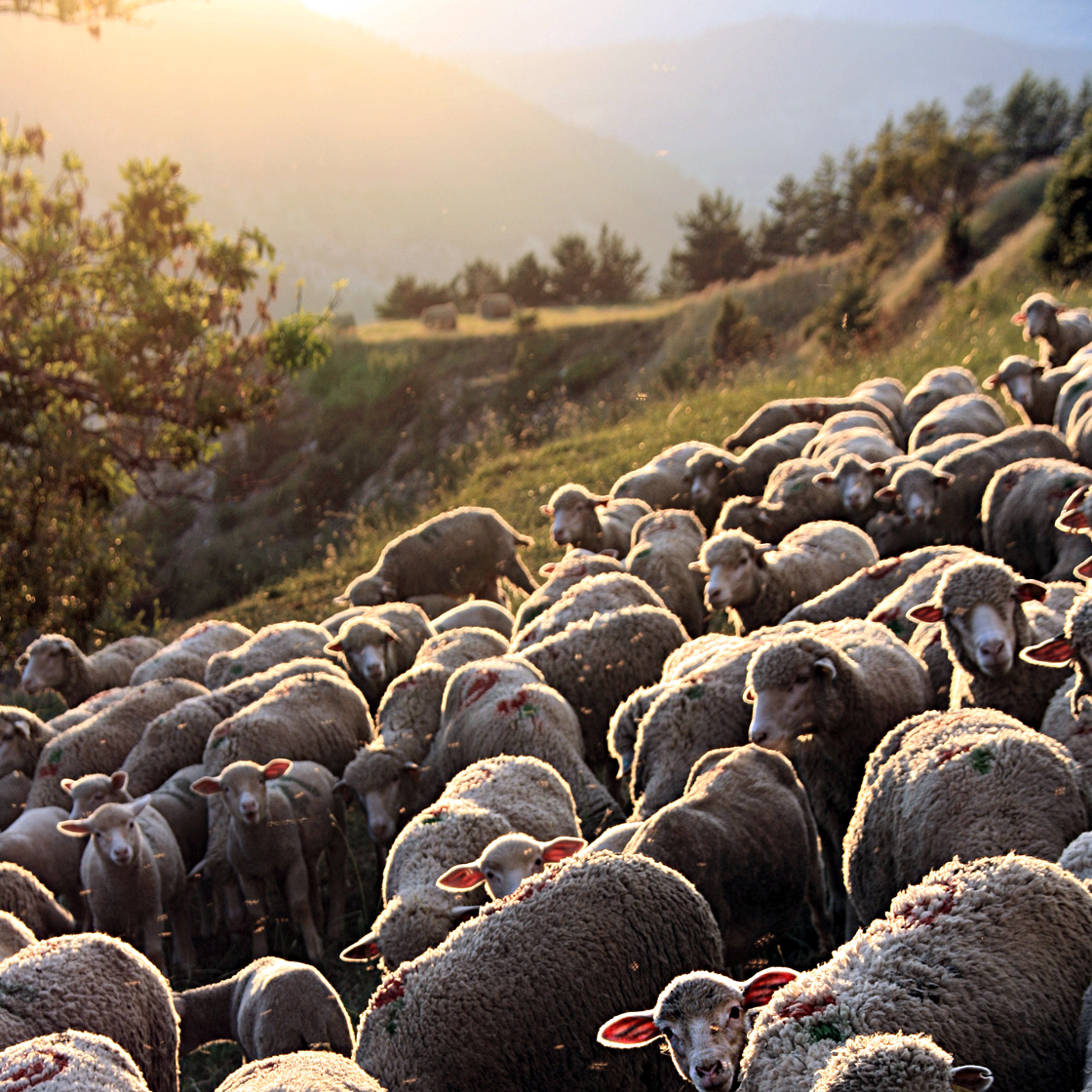
Sheep of Devoluy in summer

- At the top of the plateau de Bure, accessible by foot from the top of the ski track Pierra of Superdevoluy, there is the NOEMA which is currently the most advanced millimeter array in the Northern Hemisphere. This observatory is operated and maintained by the Institute for Radio Astronomy in Millimetric range (IRAM)
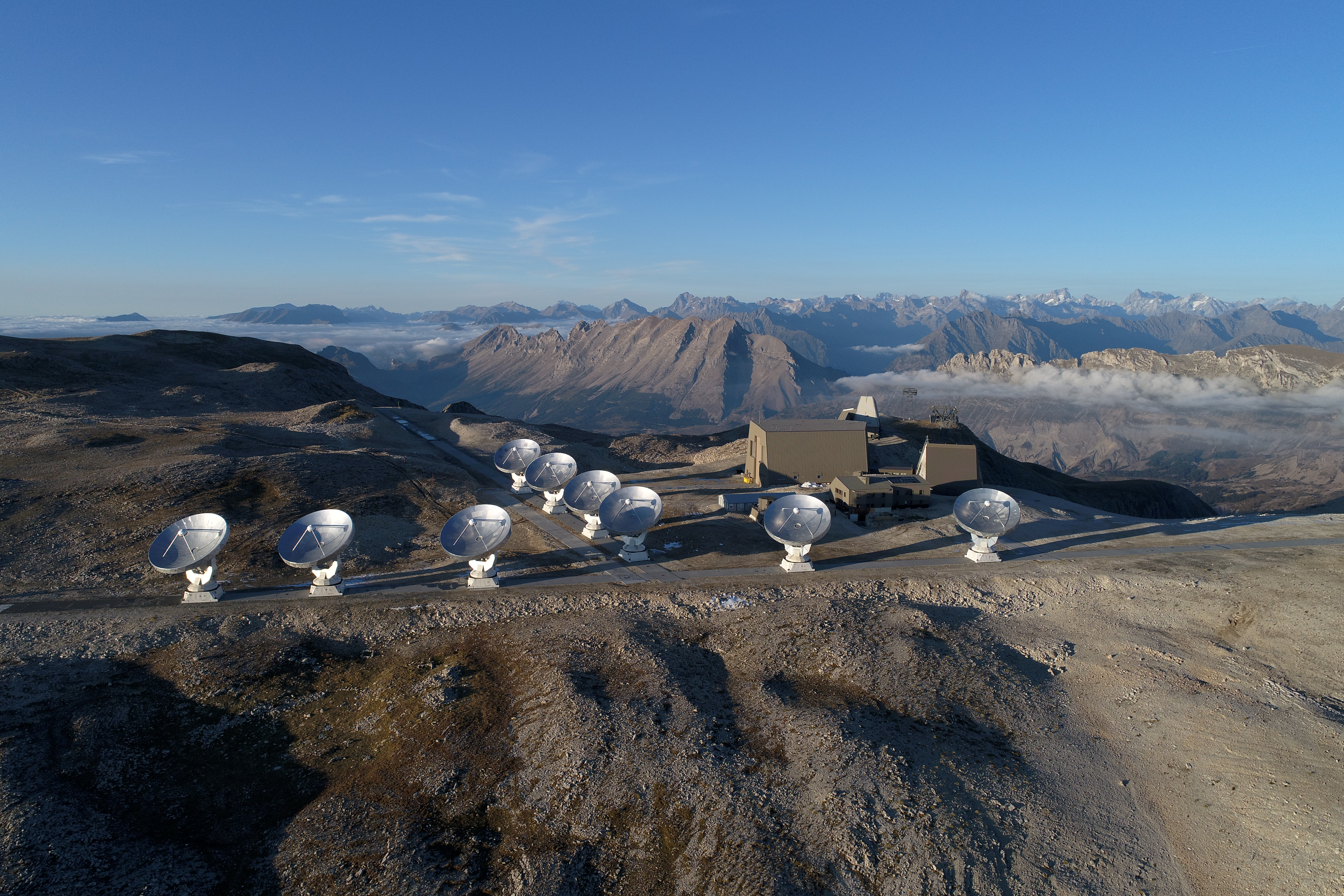
- NOEMA observatory
  From a three antenna interferometer with a maximum baseline of 288 meters in 1988, it has evolved to an 12-antenna array with baselines up to 760 meters.
