= Canton of Veynes =

Coordinates: 44°41′07″N 6°19′33″E

Veynes
- Canton
- Country: France
- Region: Provence-Alpes-Côte d'Azur
- Department: Hautes-Alpes
- No. of communes: {{{nbcomm}}}
- Area: 245.83 km^{2} (94.92 sq mi)
- Population (2023): 7,151
  - Density: 29.09/km^{2} (75.34/sq mi)
- INSEE code: 05 15

The canton of Veynes is an administrative division in southeastern France. Since the French canton reorganisation which came into effect in March 2015, the canton consists of the following 8 communes:

- Châteauneuf-d'Oze
- Dévoluy
- Furmeyer
- Manteyer
- Montmaur
- Rabou
- La Roche-des-Arnauds
- Veynes

== Demographics ==
Historical population
Year	Pop.	±% p.a.
2013	6,813	—
2018	6,901	+0.26%
Source: INSEE

== See also ==
- Cantons of the Hautes-Alpes department
- Communes of France
