= Héry-sur-Alby =

- Commune
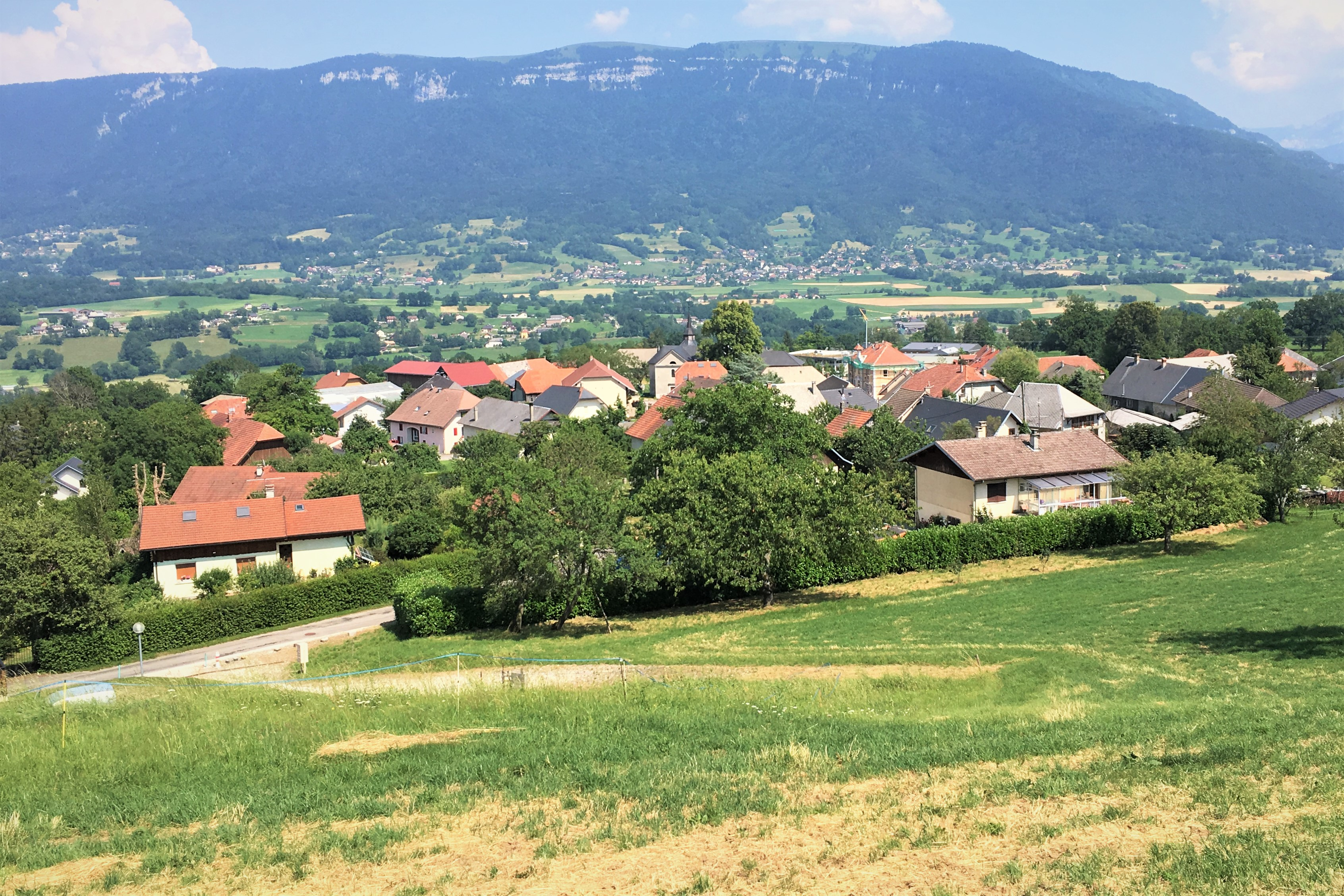
- Héry-sur-Alby
- Location of Héry-sur-Alby
- Location within France Location within Auvergne-Rhône-Alpes
- Coordinates: 45°47′52″N 6°00′50″E
- Country: France
- Region: Auvergne-Rhône-Alpes
- Department: Haute-Savoie
- Arrondissement: Annecy
- Canton: Rumilly
- Intercommunality: CA Grand Annecy

Government
  - Mayor (2020–2026): Jacques Archinard
- Area^{1}: 7.33 km^{2} (2.83 sq mi)
- Highest elevation: 702 m (2,303 ft)
- Lowest elevation: 398 m (1,306 ft)
- Population (2023): 979
  - Density: 134/km^{2} (346/sq mi)
- Time zone: UTC+01:00 (CET)
  - Summer (DST): UTC+02:00 (CEST)
- INSEE/Postal code: 74142 /74540
- ^{1} French Land Register data, which excludes lakes, ponds, glaciers > 1 km^{2} (0.386 sq mi or 247 acres) and river estuaries.

Héry-sur-Alby (French pronunciation: [eʁi syʁ albi]; literally Héry on Alby;Arpitan: Éri) is a commune in the Haute-Savoie department in the Auvergne-Rhône-Alpes region in south-eastern France.

== Geography ==
The Chéran forms the commune's eastern border.

== Gallery ==
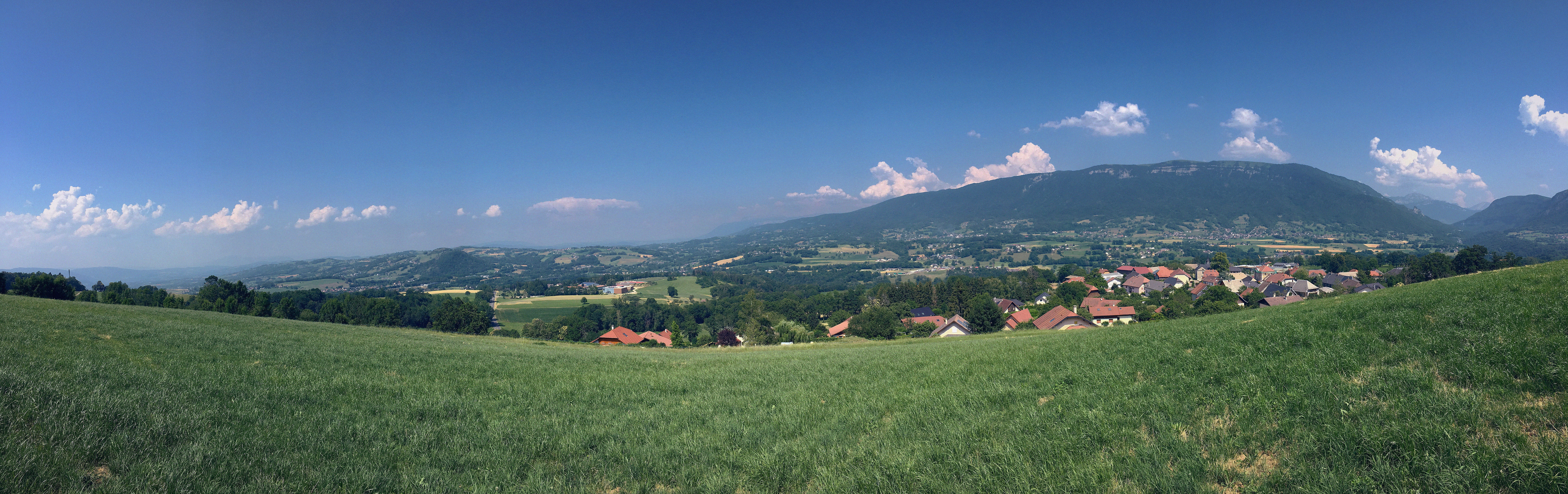
Panorama of the massif des Bornes and Bauges seen from Héry-sur-Alby

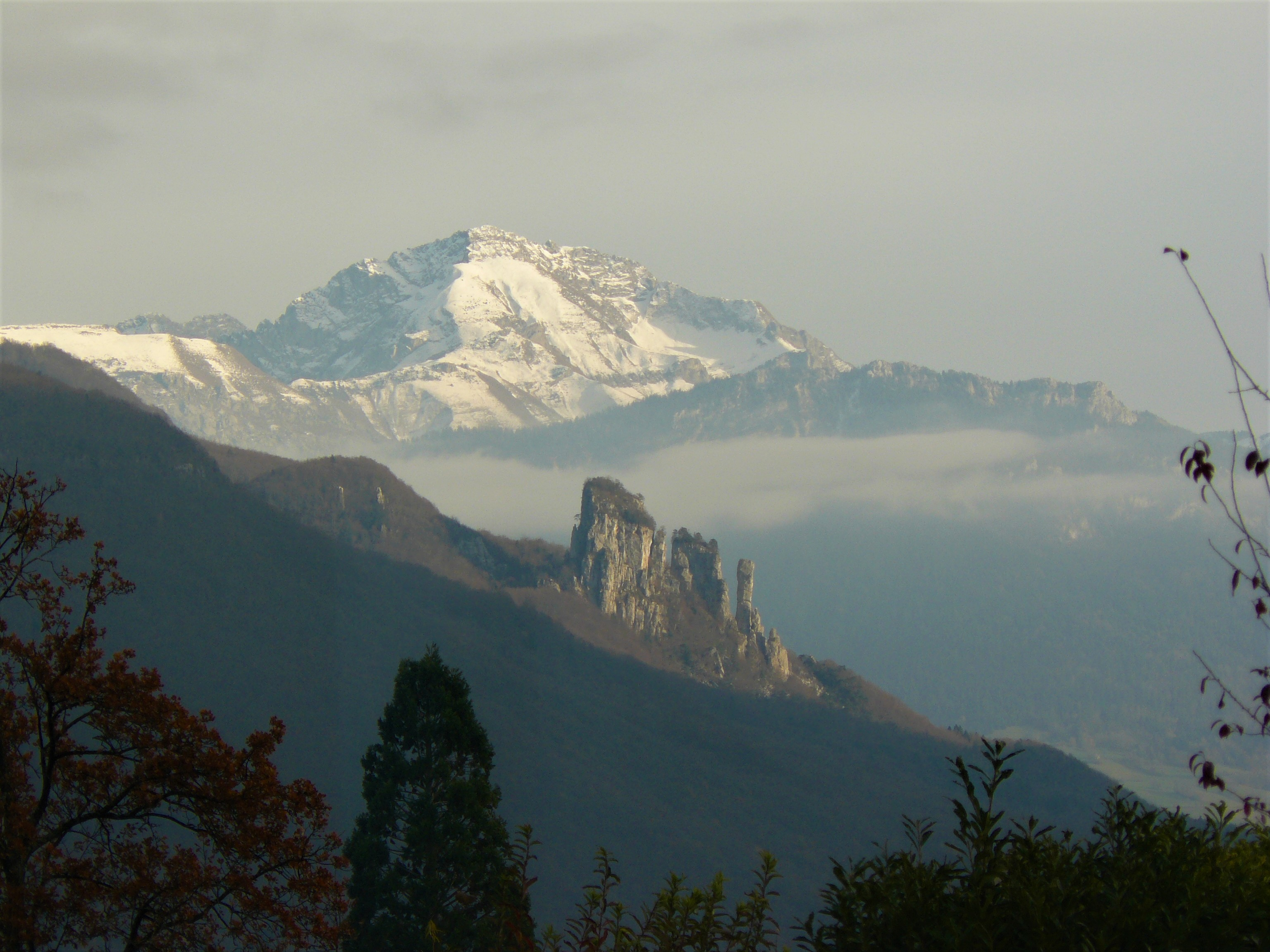
The Trélod, The Montagne du Charbon et the Tours Saint-Jacques seen from Héry-sur-Alby.

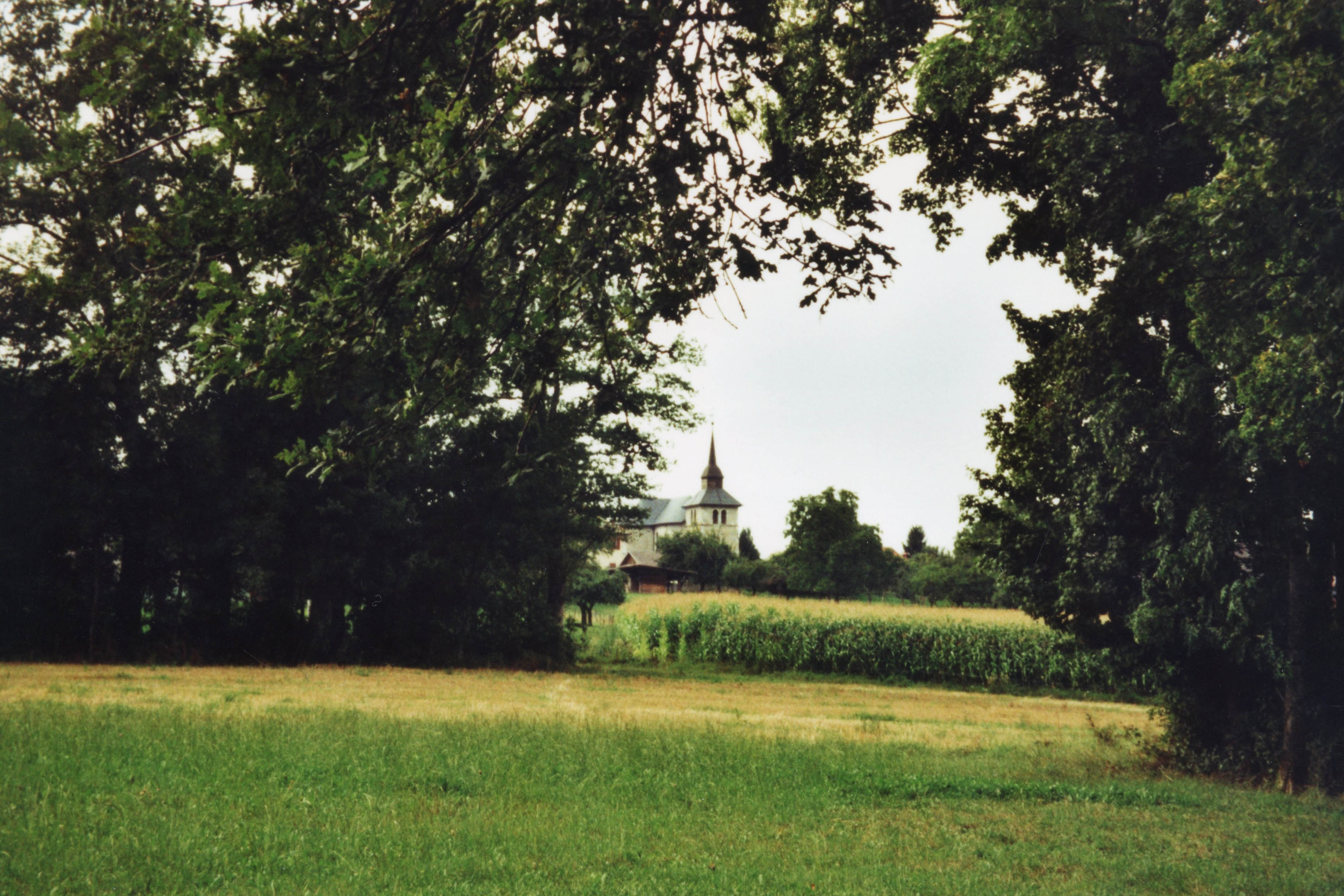
Notre-Dame-de-la-Nativité church in Héry-sur-Alby.

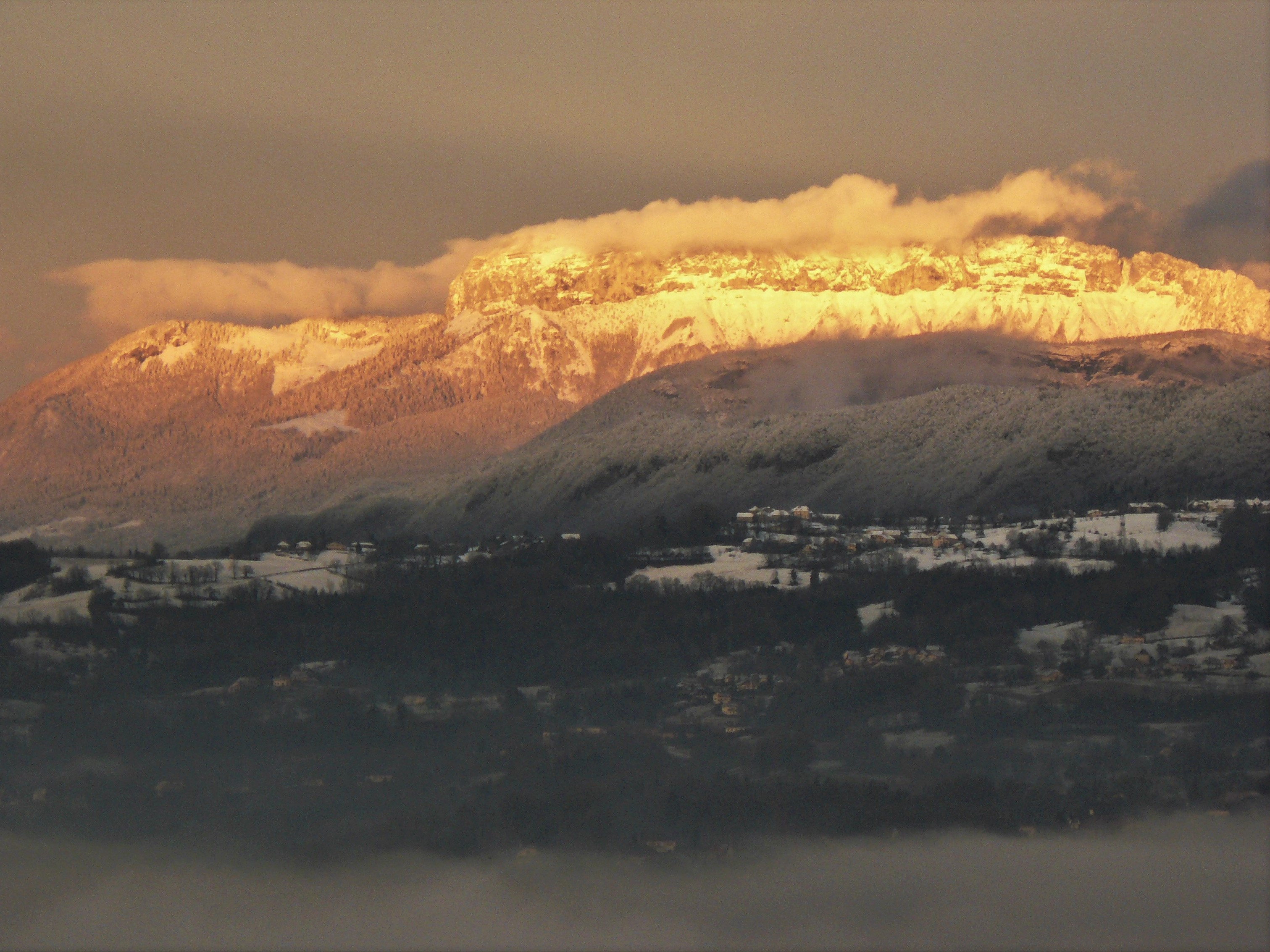
Sunset on the snowy Parmelan, seen from Héry-sur-Alby.

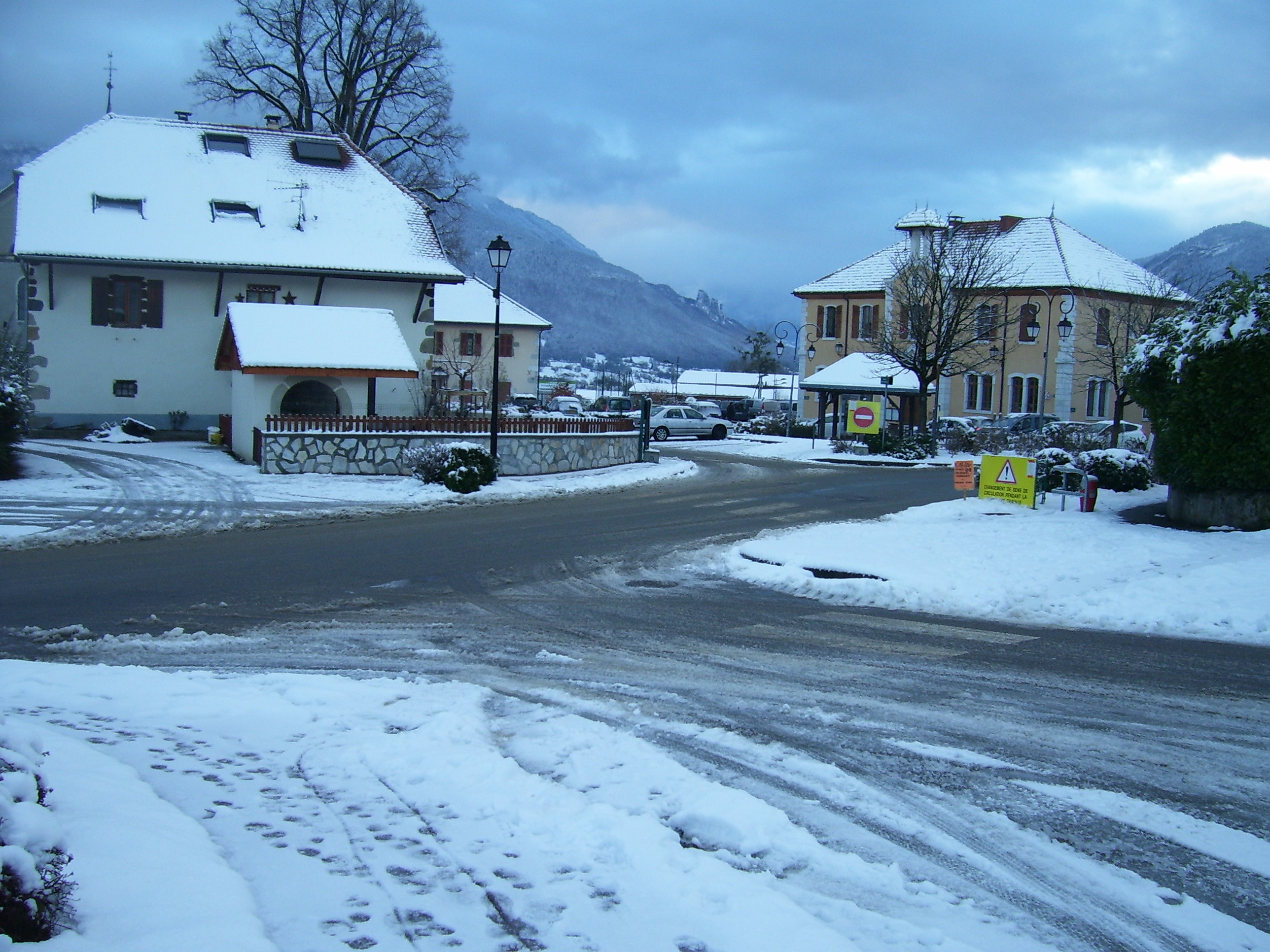
Snowy streets in Héry-sur-Alby.

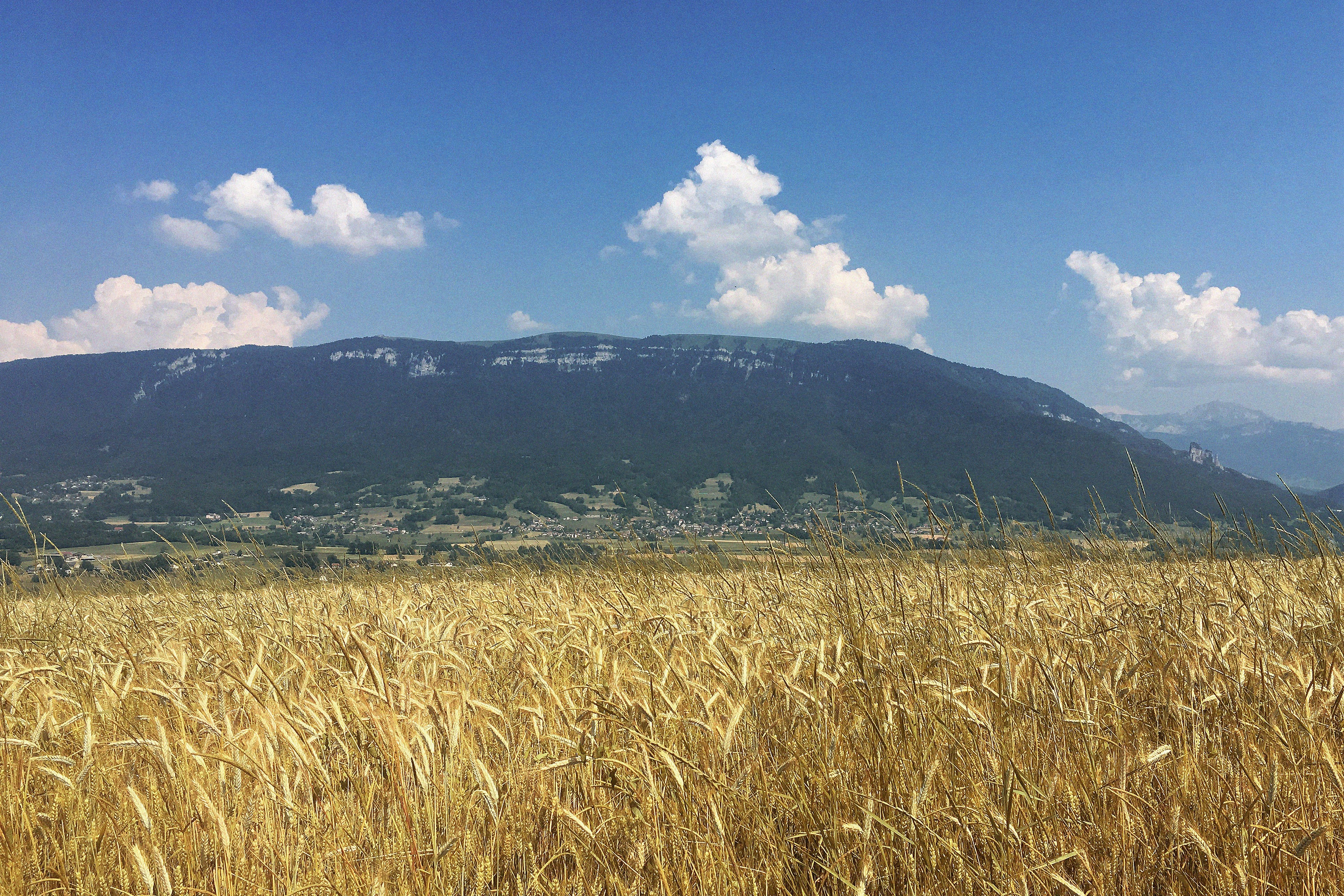
The Semnoz seen from a wheat field on top of Héry-sur-Alby's hill.

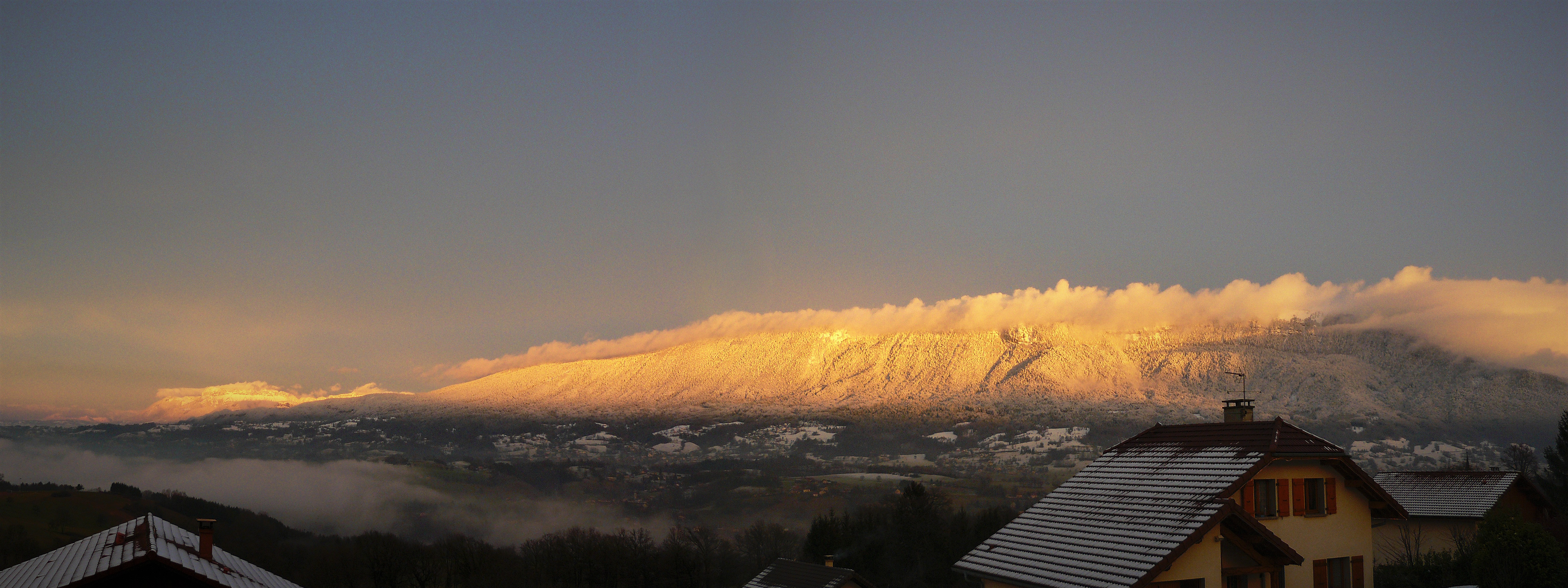
Panorama of the snowy Parmelan and Semnoz seen from Héry-sur-Alby.

== See also ==
- Communes of the Haute-Savoie department
