= Nivolet cross =

Monumental cross at the summit of Mont du Nivolet in Savoie, France

- Croix du Nivolet
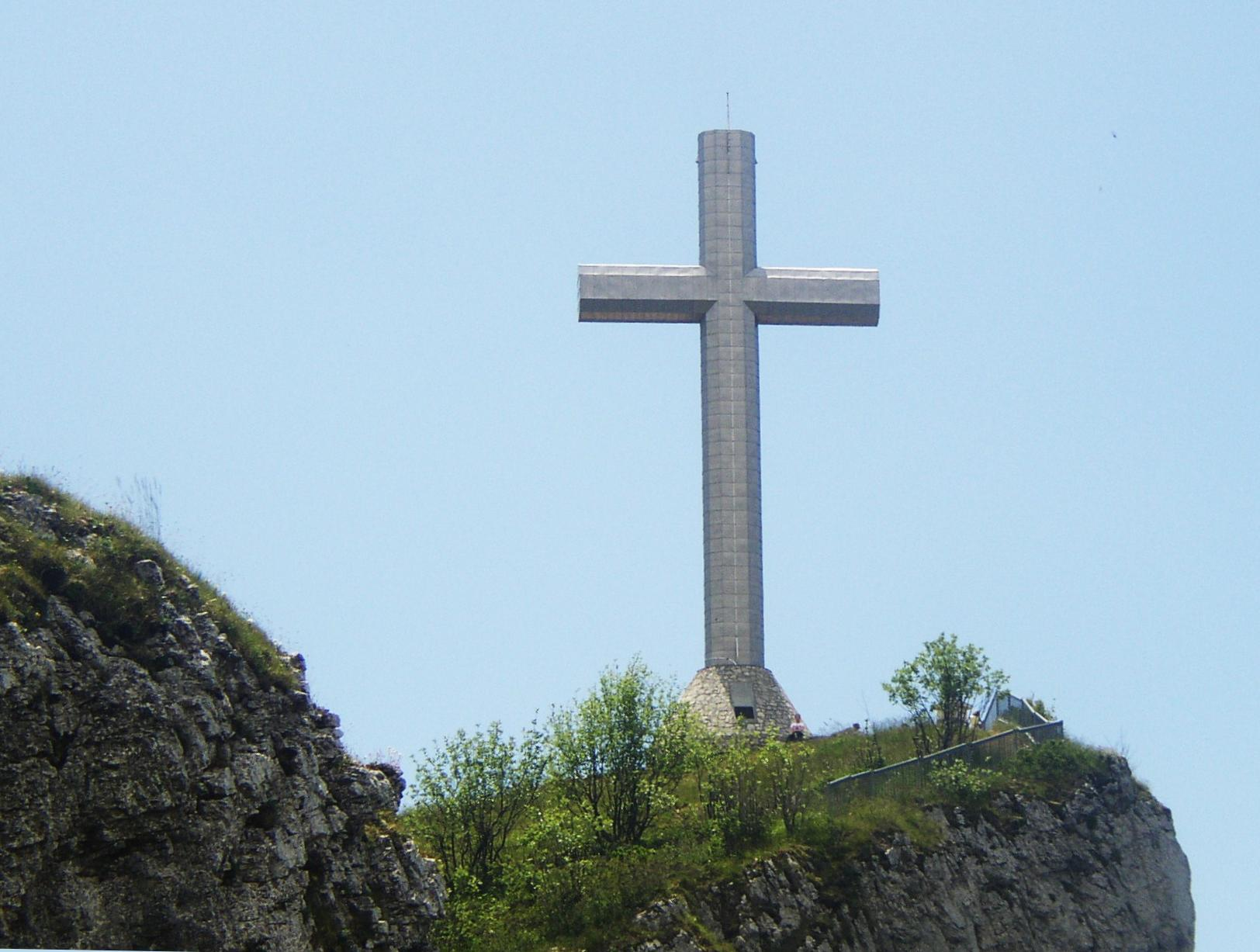
- General view

- Location within Auvergne-Rhône-Alpes

Religion
- Region: Auvergne-Rhône-Alpes

Location
- Municipality: Les Déserts
- State: Savoie
- Country: France
- Interactive map of Nivolet cross
- Coordinates: 45.613602°N 5.96556°E

Architecture
- Architects: Gotteland, Dénarié, Bertin
- Type: Summit cross
- Style: Monumental
- Funded by: Count Louis de Fernex de Montgex (1861), Marquis de la Serraz committee (1910)
- General contractor: Grosse company
- Groundbreaking: 1861 (first cross), 1910 (current cross)
- Completed: 1861 (first cross), 1911 (current cross)
- Construction cost: 6500 francs (1910 cross)

Specifications
- Height (max): 21.5 metres (71 ft)
- Materials: Reinforced concrete, aluminum plates
- Elevation: 1,547 m (5,075 ft)

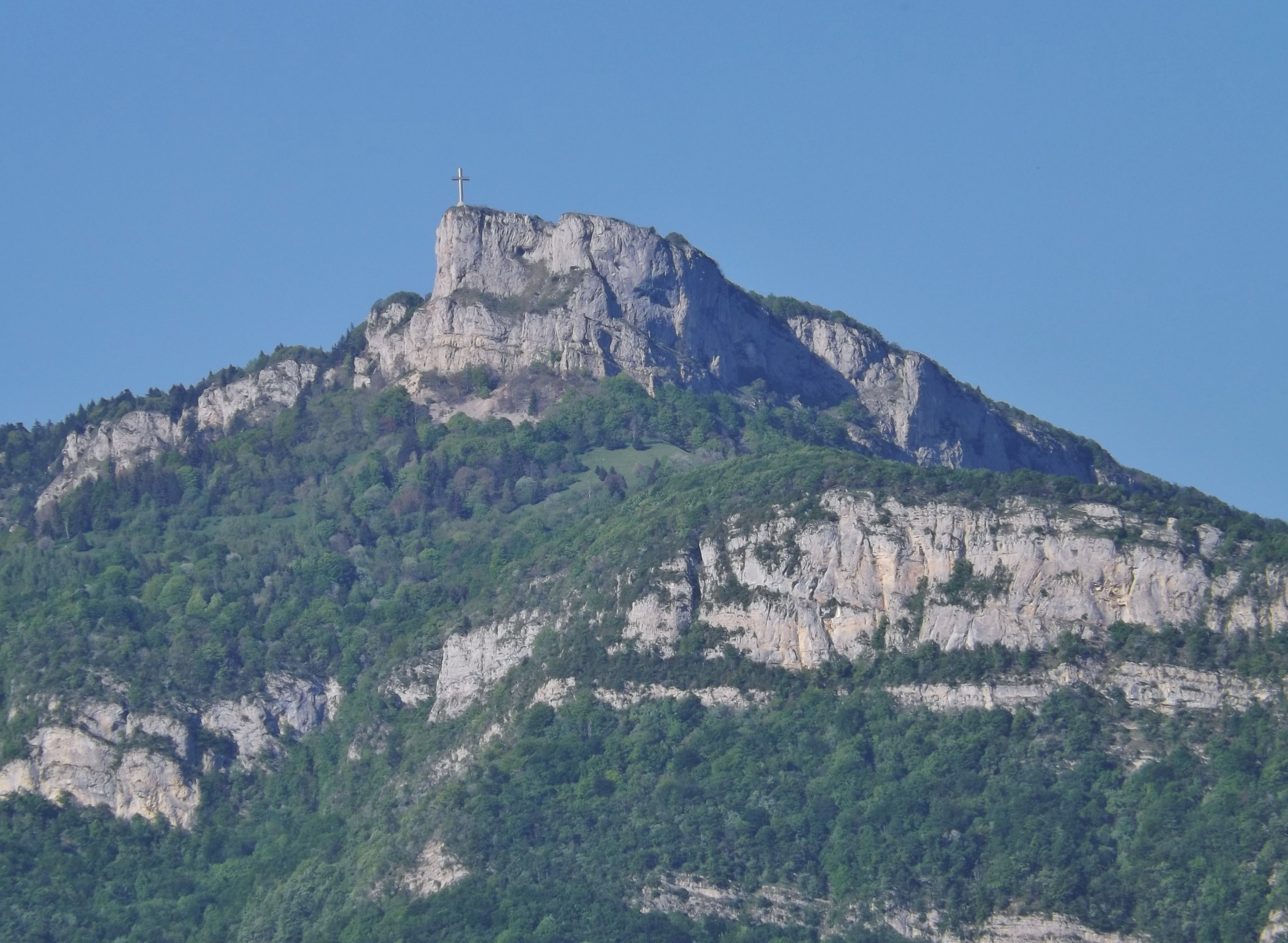
The Nivolet and its cross as seen from the Chambéry basin.

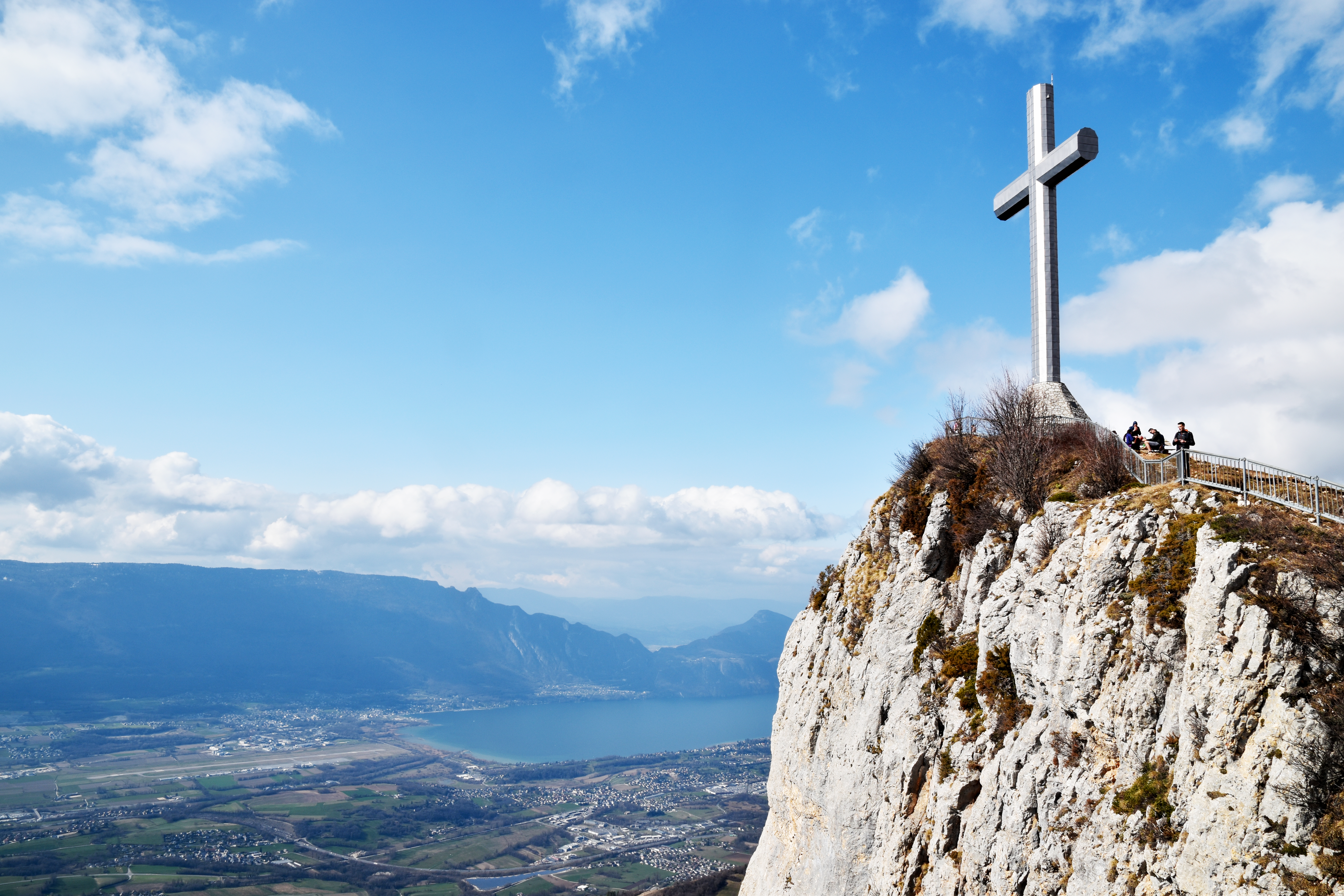
The Nivolet cross overlooking the Chambéry cluse and Lake Bourget. The elevation difference between the summit and the plain below is approximately 1,300 metres (4,300 ft). Opposite stands the Mont du Chat.

The Nivolet cross (French: Croix du Nivolet) is a monumental summit cross located at the top of Mont du Nivolet in the Bauges massif, part of the Prealps in France. Overlooking the city of Chambéry in Savoie, it is situated within the commune of Les Déserts, near the border with Saint-Jean-d'Arvey, at an altitude of 1,547 metres (5,075 ft).

== History ==
On September 15, 1861, the first Nivolet cross was inaugurated by François-Marie Vibert, Bishop of Maurienne, delegated by Cardinal Billiet, who, at age 78, was unable to make the journey himself.

The history of the cross began when the municipal council of Chambéry decided to create the Avenue du Comte Vert, requiring the demolition of the Black Penitents' chapel, along with its calvary and cross. The prior of the confraternity, Count Louis de Fernex de Montgex, a retired intendant, agreed on the condition that the existing cross be relocated to a site visible from the Chambéry cluse. The site of the cross des Raforniers on the Dent du Nivolet was chosen for the new monumental cross. On July 31, 1861, the Prefect of Savoie, Hippolyte Dieu, authorized its construction. A public subscription was launched, with the count as the primary benefactor. Residents of Les Déserts transported materials, and Chambéry businesses contributed to the construction. The cross, a metal framework covered with tinplate, was inaugurated on September 15, 1861. In 1867, the cross's arms were extended by one meter. In 1872, its coating was replaced, and in 1877, it was illuminated in honor of Pope Pius IX.

On December 22, 1909, a hurricane damaged the cross beyond repair, necessitating a replacement. A committee, chaired by the Marquis de la Serraz with Mr. Abrioud as treasurer, was formed. The project was designed by Mr. Gotteland, an engineer from the Corps des ponts et chaussées, and architects Mr. Dénarié and Mr. Bertin. The new cross, constructed from reinforced concrete and covered with aluminum plates, was built by the Grosse company for 6,500 francs. It stands 21.5 metres (71 ft) tall, is anchored 5 metres (16 ft) into the ground, has a span of 9.6 metres (31 ft), a circumference of 2 metres (6.6 ft), and weighs 70 tonnes (69 long tons; 77 short tons). Completed in autumn 1910, it was inaugurated on Sunday, July 2, 1911, by Vicar General Jean-Baptiste Gavillet, with approximately 3,500 people in attendance.

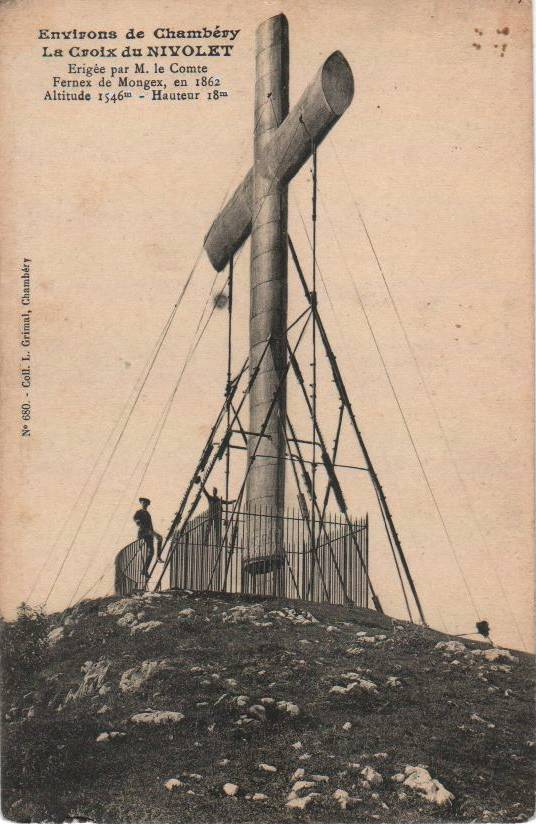
The original Nivolet cross before its destruction by a hurricane in 1909.

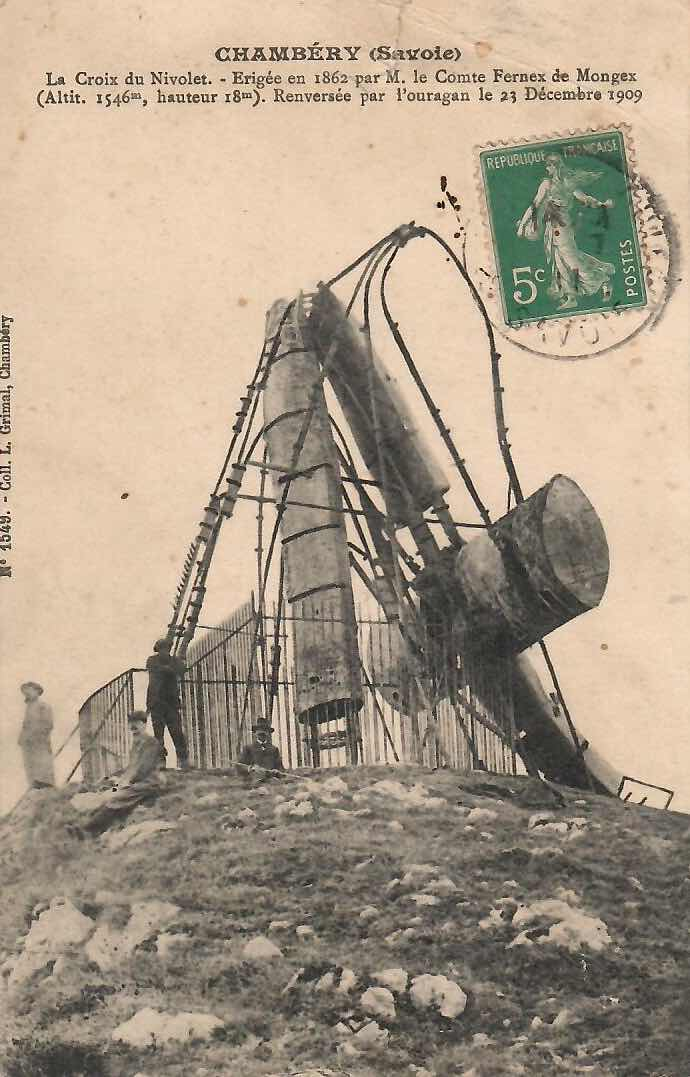
The Nivolet cross bent by a hurricane in 1909.

In 1944, during World War II, the cross's base was damaged in an attack. On July 2, 1960, Charles Montreuil, committee president, inaugurated the cross's illumination to mark the centenary of Savoy's annexation. After damage from lightning and vandalism, a new lighting system, funded by EDF, was installed in 1989 in preparation for the Albertville Winter Olympics.

The cross serves as a geodetic point for the IGN within the French geodetic network.

== Access ==
The Nivolet cross is accessible only by foot. The most popular trail, known as "par les Crêtes," starts at the Sire in the La Féclaz ski resort. The elevation gain is minimal, about 140 metres (460 ft), as the resort is at a similar altitude to the cross, but the hike takes approximately one hour.

Alternatively, access is possible from the Nivolet alpine pasture below, starting from the hamlets of Lovettaz (Saint-Jean-d'Arvey) or Pragondran (Verel-Pragondran). An equipped passage, "Pas de l'Échelle," with handrails, cables, steps, and iron rungs, allows climbers to navigate a cliff fissure to reach the final plateau and the cross. A steeper, unequipped alternative, "la cheminée," lies further west. These routes are less frequented due to their greater physical demands and need for caution.

== See also ==
- Mont Revard
- Bauges Massif
- Chambéry
- Savoie
- Summit cross
- Annexation of Savoy
