= Mont Peney =

Mountain in France

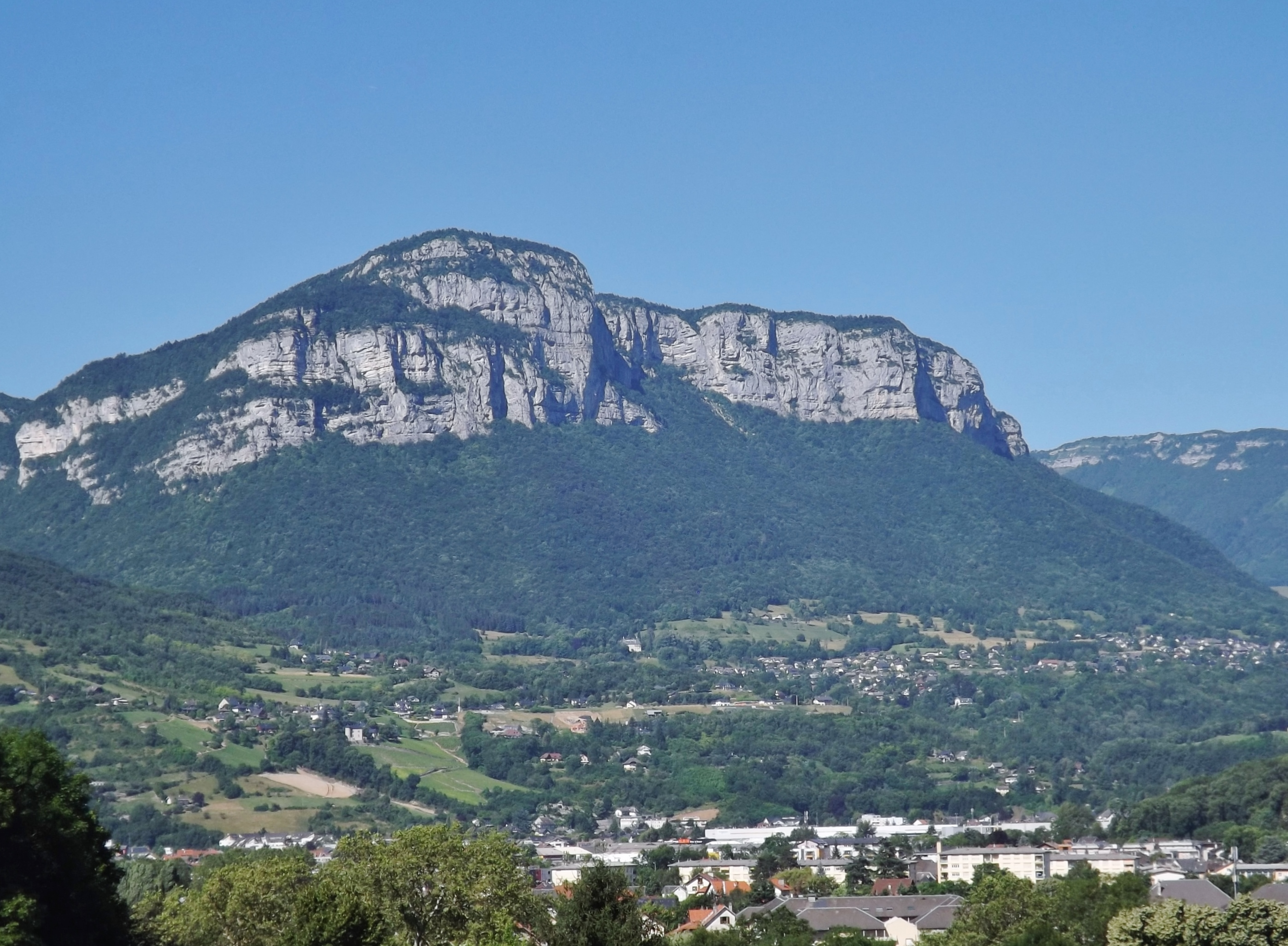
- Mont Peney seen from Chambéry

Highest point
- Elevation: 1,356 m (4,449 ft)
- Coordinates: 45°35′52″N 05°59′21″E

Geography
- Location within France
- Location: Savoie, France
- Parent range: Bauges

Mont Peney is a mountain of Savoie, France. It lies in the Bauges range. It has an elevation of 1,356 metres (4,449 ft) above sea level.
