= Pointe de la Galoppaz =

Mountain in Savoie, France

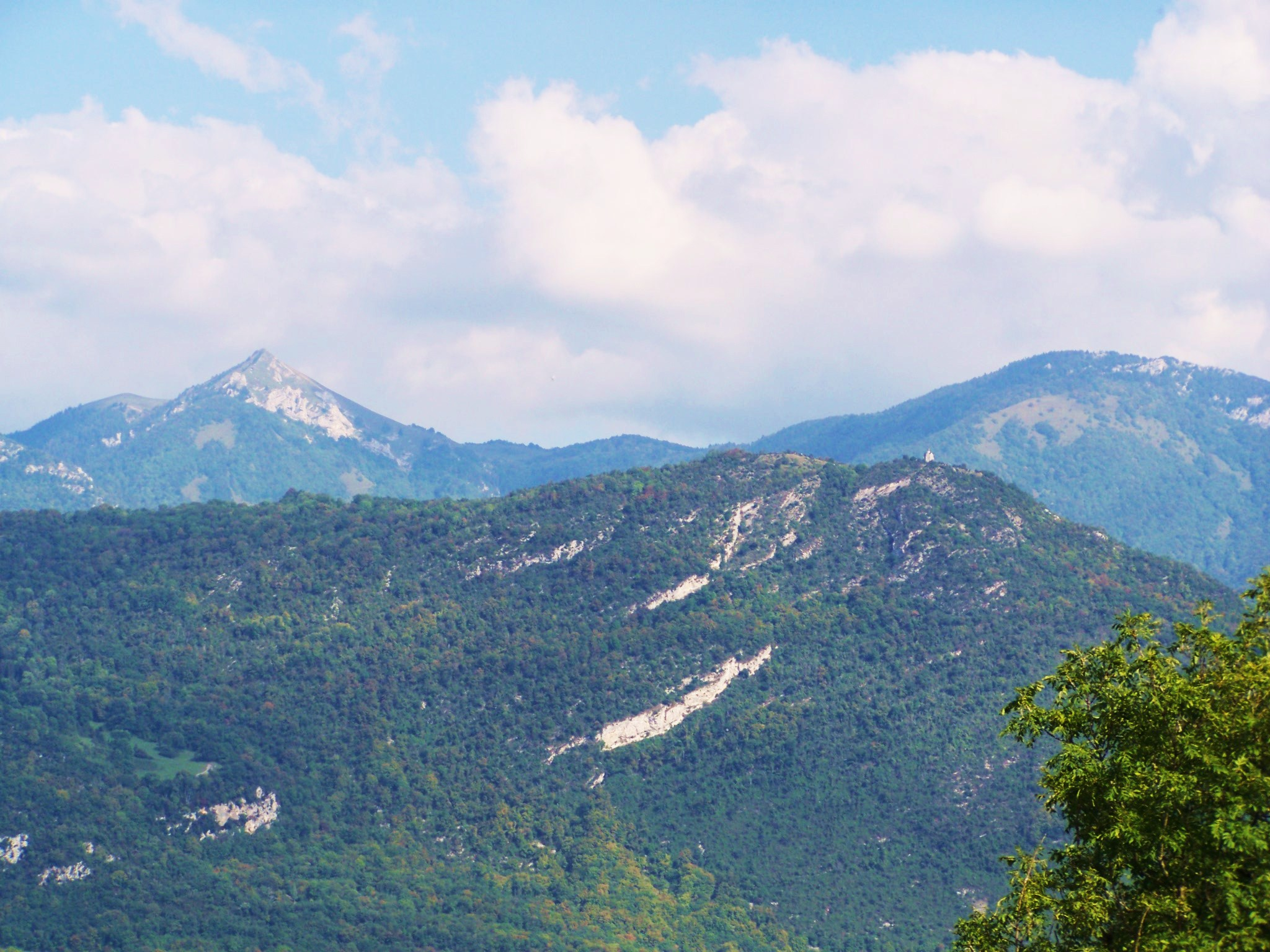

Highest point
- Elevation: 1,681 m (5,515 ft)
- Coordinates: 45°33′57″N 06°04′00″E

Geography
- Location within France
- Location: Savoie, France
- Parent range: Bauges Massif

The Pointe de la Galoppaz (elevation: 1,681 metres (5,515 ft)), is a mountain in the Bauges Massif in Savoie, France.
