= Nivolet =

Mountain in France

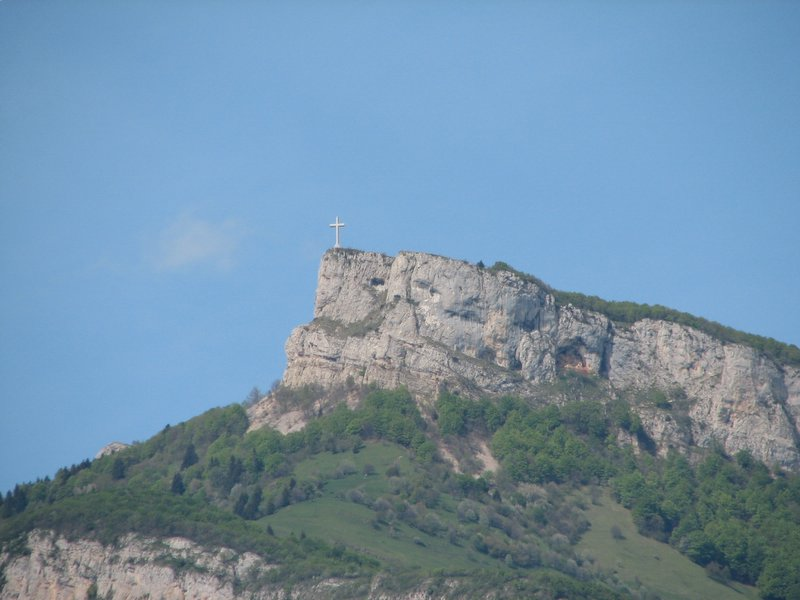

Highest point
- Elevation: 1,547 m (5,075 ft)
- Prominence: 390 m (1,280 ft)
- Coordinates: 45°36′50″N 05°57′56″E

Geography
- Location within Alps
- Location: Savoie, France
- Parent range: Bauges

The Nivolet (1,547 m) is a mountain of the Bauges Massif in the French Prealps in Savoie, France.

Overlooking the city of Chambéry, the Nivolet cross is located at the summit since 1861.
