= Arcalod =

Mountain in France

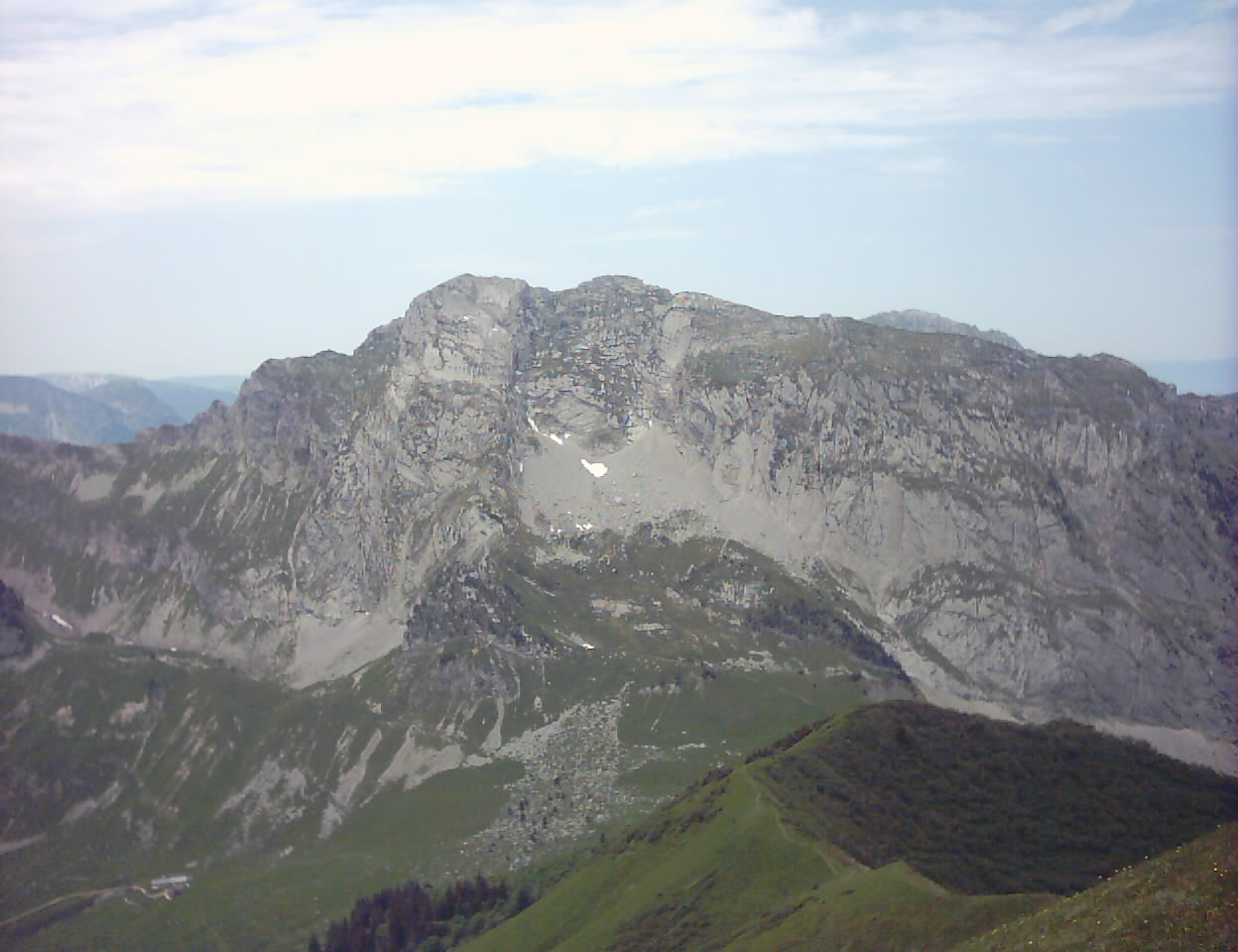

Highest point
- Elevation: 2,217 m (7,274 ft)
- Prominence: 1,713 m (5,620 ft)
- Isolation: 15.72 km (9.77 mi)
- Listing: Ultra
- Coordinates: 45°40′54″N 06°13′42″E

Geography
- Location within Alps
- Location: Savoie, France
- Parent range: Bauges, Western Alps

Geology
- Rock age: Tertiary

Arcalod is a mountain of Savoie, France. It lies in the Bauges range of the French Prealps and has an elevation of 2,217 metres (7,274 ft) above sea level.

Arcalod has a prominence of 1,713 metres (5,620 ft) and is thus an ultra prominent peak. It is the 4th most prominent peak in the French Alps.

== See also ==
List of Alpine peaks by prominence
