= Pécloz =

Mountain in France

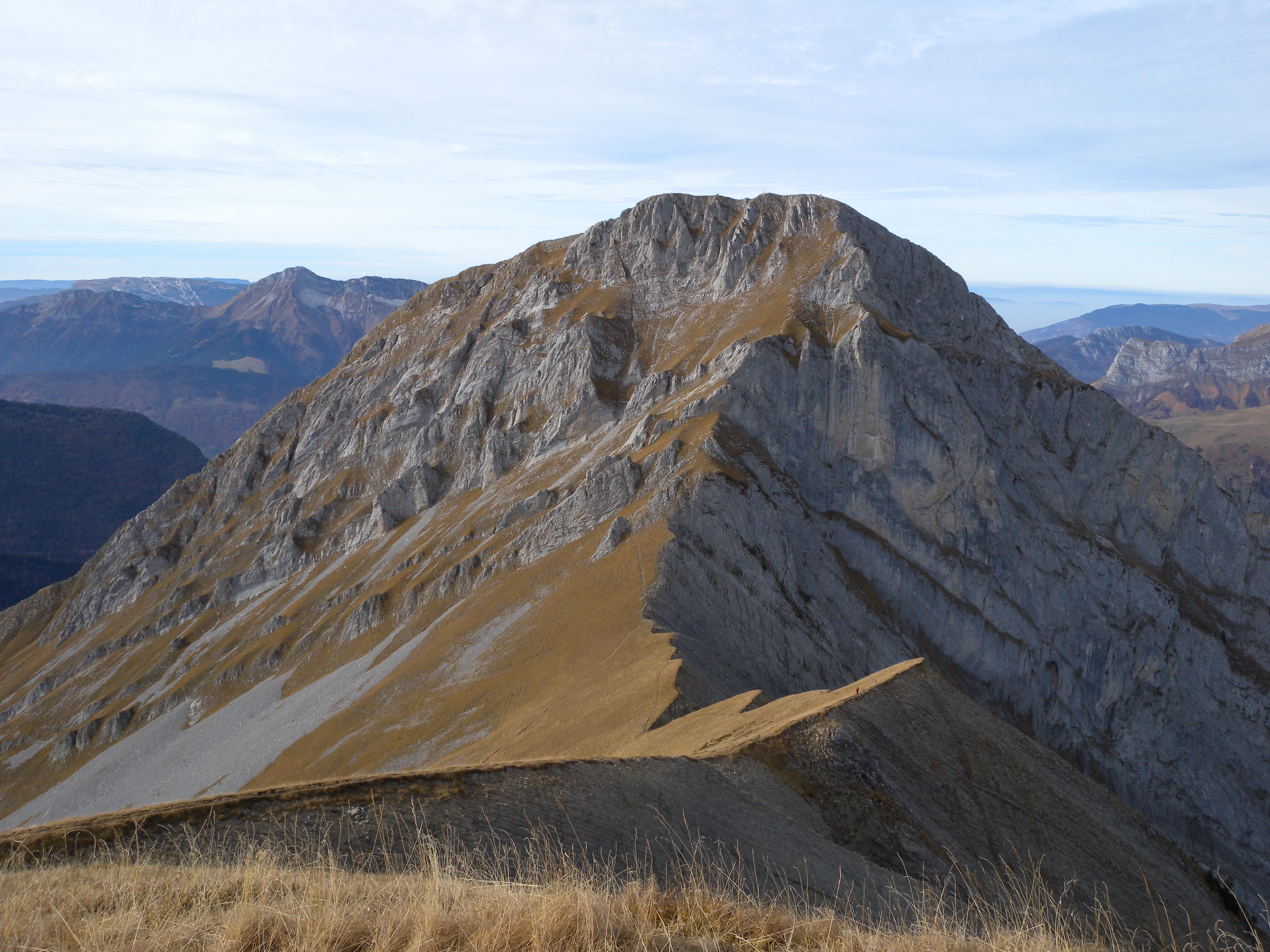
- Pécloz

Highest point
- Elevation: 2,197 m (7,208 ft)
- Prominence: 679 m (2,228 ft)
- Coordinates: 45°37′56″N 06°13′52″E

Geography
- Location within Alps Location within France
- Location: Savoie, France
- Parent range: Bauges

Pécloz is a mountain of Savoie, France. It lies in the Bauges range of the French Prealps and has an elevation of 2,197 metres (7,208 ft) above sea level.
