= Montagne du Charbon =

Mountain in France

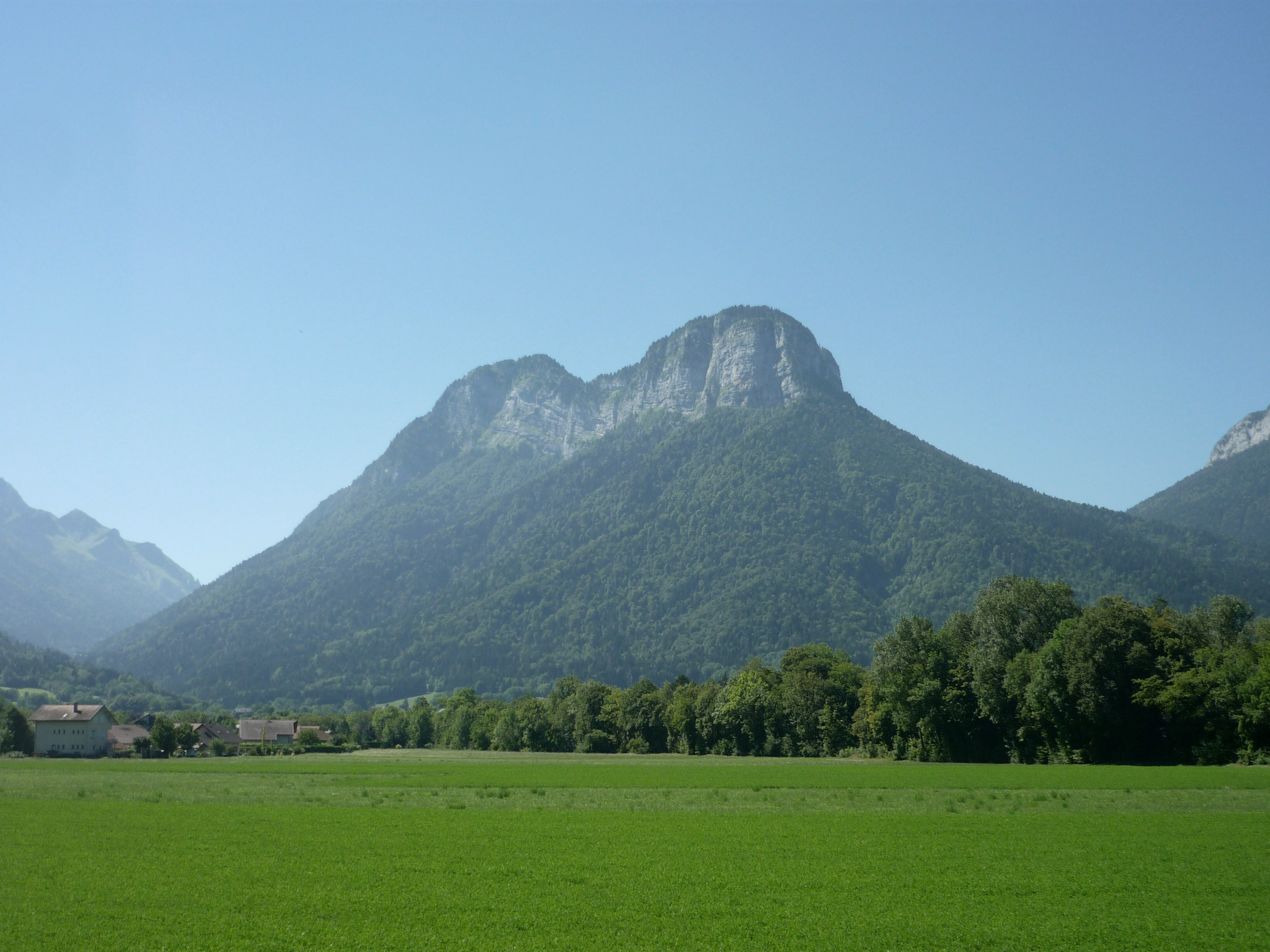
- Montagne du Charbon

Highest point
- Elevation: 1,932 m (6,339 ft)
- Coordinates: 45°42′39″N 06°11′25″E

Geography
- Location within France
- Location: Savoie and Haute-Savoie, France
- Parent range: Bauges

Montagne du Charbon (1,932 m) is a mountain in the Bauges in Savoie, France.
