= Trélod =

Mountain in France

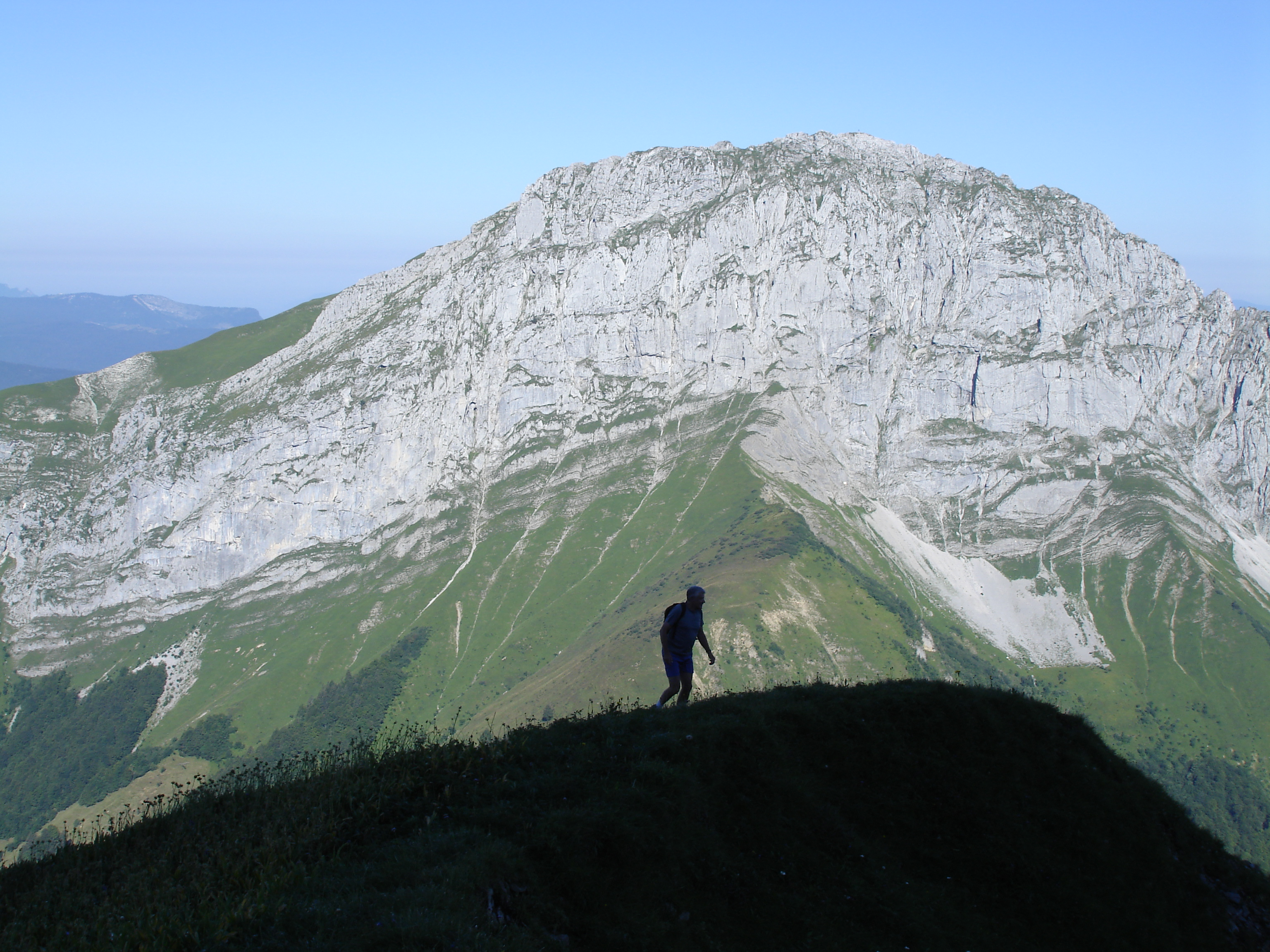
- Mont Trélod

Highest point
- Elevation: 2,181 m (7,156 ft)
- Prominence: 686 m (2,251 ft)
- Coordinates: 45°41′34″N 06°11′47″E

Geography
- Location within Alps
- Location: Savoie and Haute-Savoie, France
- Parent range: Bauges

Trélod is a mountain of Savoie and Haute-Savoie in France. It lies in the Bauges range of the French Prealps and has an elevation of 2,181 metres above sea level.
