= Bauges Mountains =

Mountain range in France

Coordinates: 45°38′N 6°10′E

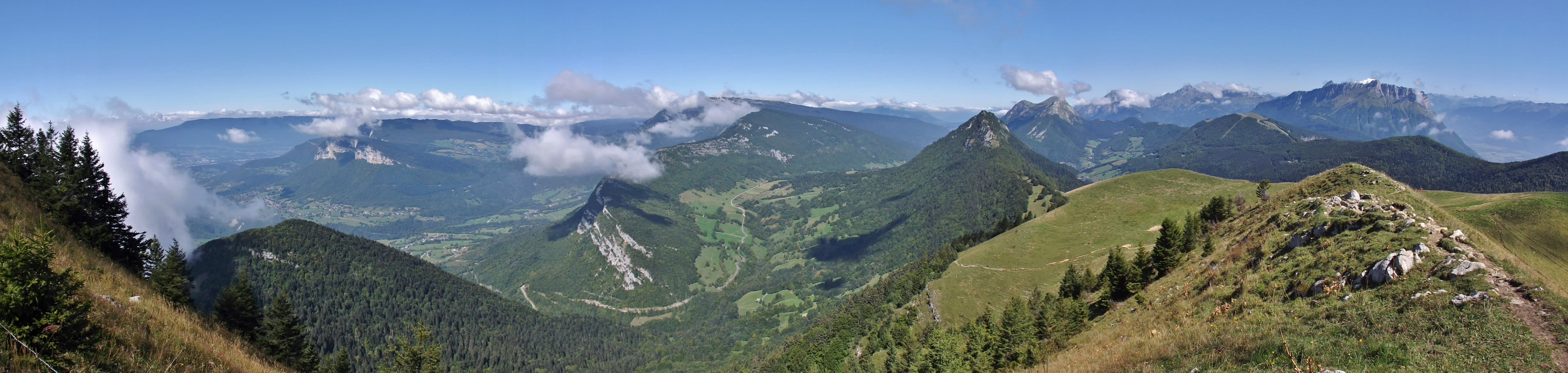
View from the southern part of the Bauges

Aerial view of Dent d'Arclusaz and Pointe des Arlicots

Map of the Bauges Mountains

The Bauges Mountains (French: Massif des Bauges, pronounced [masif de boʒ]; Italian: Prealpi dei Bovili) are a mountain range in Auvergne-Rhône-Alpes, Eastern France, stretching from the city of Annecy, Haute-Savoie to the city of Chambéry, Savoie, which is part of the French Prealps.

== Major peaks ==
The Bauges have fourteen summits above 2,000 metres (6,562 ft):

- Arcalod, 2,217 m (7,274 ft), highest point in the range
- Sambuy, 2,198 m (7,211 ft)
- Pécloz, 2,197 m (7,208 ft)
- Trélod, 2,181 m (7,156 ft)
- Pointe de Chaurionde, 2,173 m (7,129 ft)
- Mont d'Armenaz, 2,158 m (7,080 ft)
- Pointe des Arces, 2,076 m (6,811 ft)
- Mont de la Coche, 2,070 m (6,791 ft)
- Dent de Cons, 2,064 m (6,772 ft)
- Pointe des Arlicots, 2,060 m (6,759 ft)
- Mont Colombier, 2,043 m (6,703 ft)
- Dent d'Arclusaz, 2,040 m (6,693 ft)
- Tré le Mollard, 2,035 m (6,677 ft)
- Grand Parra, 2,012 m (6,601 ft)

Other noteworthy summits include:

- Montagne du Charbon, 1,932 m (6,339 ft)
- Semnoz, 1,699 m (5,574 ft), above Annecy
- Pointe de la Galoppaz, 1,681 m (5,515 ft)
- Nivolet, 1,547 m (5,075 ft), above Chambéry
- Mont Revard, 1,562 m (5,125 ft), above Aix-les-Bains
- Mont Peney, 1,356 m (4,449 ft)

== Caving ==
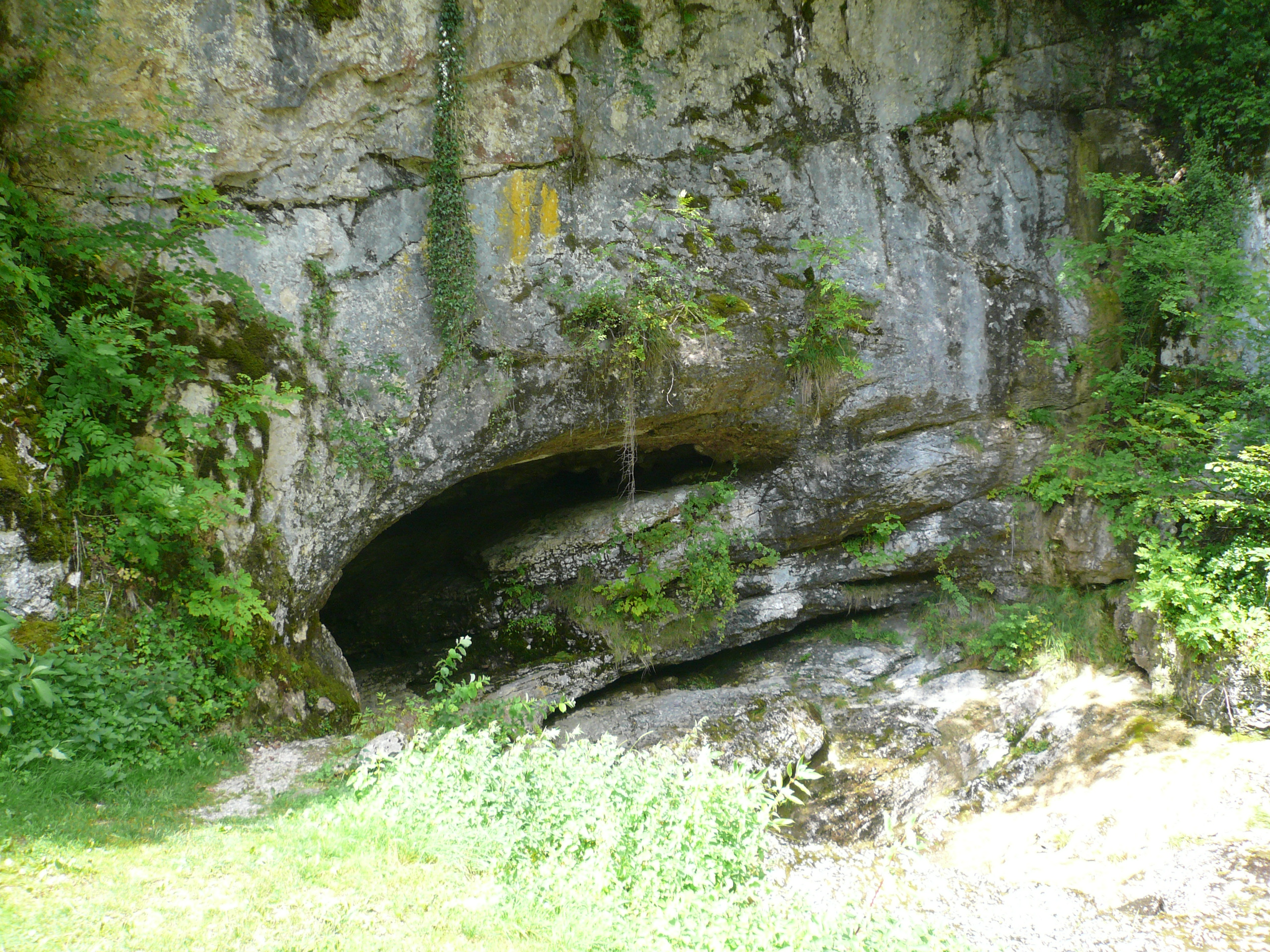
The cave of Prérouge in Arith, Savoie, resurgence of the waters of the Bange mountain

The Bauges massif contains many underground cavities. There are three main sectors: the Margériaz, the Revard sector and the mountain of Bange-Prépoulain. Under these karsts large underground networks develop in particular the Creux de la Benoite-Litorne-Grotte de Prérouge with a depth of 860 meters for 54 kilometers of development. The Margériaz sector is renowned for the length and difficulty of its meanders, which are particularly difficult to explore.
