= Canton of Rosans =

Coordinates: 44°23′33″N 5°28′15″E

Rosans
- Former canton
- Interactive map of Rosans
- Country: France
- Region: Provence-Alpes-Côte d'Azur
- Department: Hautes-Alpes
- No. of communes: {{{nbcomm}}}
- Disbanded: 2015
- Area: 189.28 km^{2} (73.08 sq mi)
- Population (2012): 1,134
  - Density: 5.991/km^{2} (15.52/sq mi)

The canton of Rosans is a former administrative division in southeastern France. It was disbanded following the French canton reorganisation which came into effect in March 2015. It consisted of 7 communes, which joined the canton of Serres in 2015. It had 1,134 inhabitants (2012).

The canton comprised the following communes:

- Bruis
- Chanousse
- Montjay
- Moydans
- Ribeyret
- Rosans
- Saint-André-de-Rosans
- Sainte-Marie
- Sorbiers

== Demographics ==
Historical population Canton of Rosans
Year	1962	1968	1975	1982	1990	1999
Pop.	924	1,148	1,095	1,079	1,083	1,087
±%	—	+24.2%	−4.6%	−1.5%	+0.4%	+0.4%
From the year 1962 on: No double counting – residents of multiple communes (e.g. students and military personnel) are counted only once. Source: INSEE

== See also ==
- Cantons of the Hautes-Alpes department
