= Canton of Orpierre =

Coordinates: 44°18′50″N 5°41′30″E

Orpierre
- Former canton
- Interactive map of Orpierre
- Country: France
- Region: Provence-Alpes-Côte d'Azur
- Department: Hautes-Alpes
- No. of communes: {{{nbcomm}}}
- Disbanded: 2015
- Area: 98.93 km^{2} (38.20 sq mi)
- Population (2012): 1,096
  - Density: 11.08/km^{2} (28.69/sq mi)

The canton of Orpierre is a former administrative division in southeastern France. It was disbanded following the French canton reorganisation which came into effect in March 2015. It consisted of 7 communes, which joined the canton of Serres in 2015. It had 1,096 inhabitants (2012).

The canton comprised the following communes:

- Étoile-Saint-Cyrice
- Lagrand
- Nossage-et-Bénévent
- Orpierre
- Sainte-Colombe
- Saléon
- Trescléoux

== Demographics ==
Historical population Canton of Orpierre
Year	1962	1968	1975	1982	1990	1999
Pop.	750	885	848	859	947	957
±%	—	+18.0%	−4.2%	+1.3%	+10.2%	+1.1%
From the year 1962 on: No double counting – residents of multiple communes (e.g. students and military personnel) are counted only once. Source: INSEE

== See also ==
- Cantons of the Hautes-Alpes department
