= Canton of Aspres-sur-Buëch =

Coordinates: 44°31′28″N 5°45′01″E

Aspres-sur-Buëch
- Former canton
- Interactive map of Aspres-sur-Buëch
- Country: France
- Region: Provence-Alpes-Côte d'Azur
- Department: Hautes-Alpes
- No. of communes: {{{nbcomm}}}
- Disbanded: 2015
- Area: 232.65 km^{2} (89.83 sq mi)
- Population (2012): 1,976
  - Density: 8.493/km^{2} (22.00/sq mi)

The canton of Aspres-sur-Buëch is a former administrative division in southeastern France. It was disbanded following the French canton reorganisation which came into effect in March 2015. It consisted of 8 communes, which joined the canton of Serres in 2015. It had 1,976 inhabitants (2012).

The canton comprised the following communes:

- Aspremont
- Aspres-sur-Buëch
- La Beaume
- La Faurie
- La Haute-Beaume
- Montbrand
- Saint-Julien-en-Beauchêne
- Saint-Pierre-d'Argençon

== Demographics ==
Historical population Canton of Aspres-sur-Buëch
Year	1962	1968	1975	1982	1990	1999
Pop.	1,529	1,740	1,568	1,634	1,648	1,703
±%	—	+13.8%	−9.9%	+4.2%	+0.9%	+3.3%
From the year 1962 on: No double counting – residents of multiple communes (e.g. students and military personnel) are counted only once. Source: INSEE

== See also ==
- Cantons of the Hautes-Alpes department
