= Pays du Buëch =

Natural region in Southern France

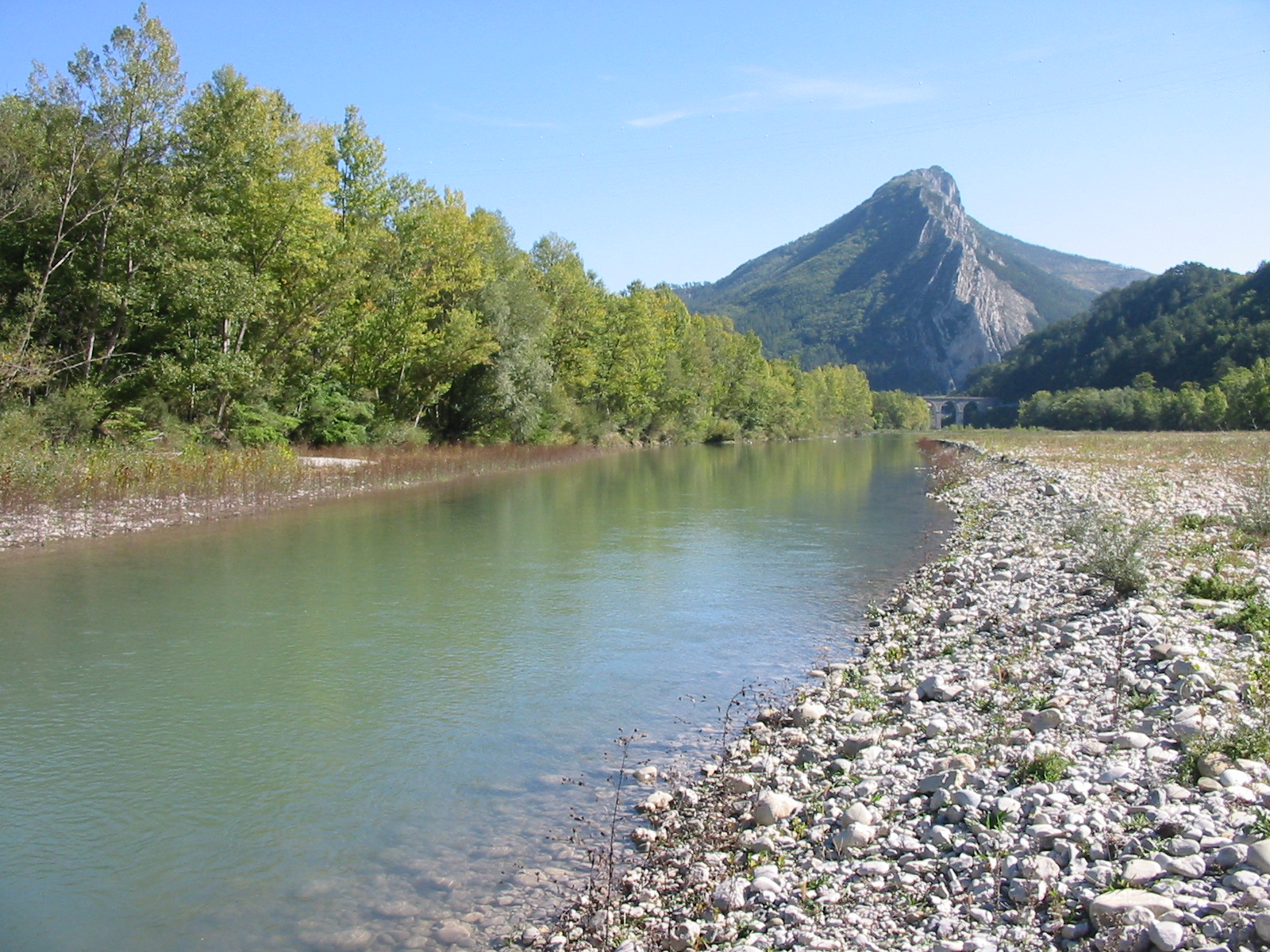
- Buëch river in Sisteron

- Location within Provence-Alpes-Côte d'Azur Location within France
- Coordinates: 44°18′29″N 5°49′25″E
- Country: France
- Region: Provence-Alpes-Côte d'Azur
- Department: Hautes-Alpes

Area
  - Total: 998 km^{2} (385 sq mi)

Pays du Buëch (French pronunciation: [pei dy bɥɛʃ]; Occitan: País de Bueg) is a natural region in France located to the south of the Alps. It encompasses all or parts of the western cantons of the Hautes-Alpes department. The region roughly corresponds to the basin of the Petit Buëch and Grand Buëch rivers, which converge near the town of Serres. The upper part of the Grand Buëch valley is specifically referred to as the Bochaine.

== Geography ==
It is a mid-altitude mountainous area dominated by several prominent peaks, such as Aujour (1,834 m) and Céüse (2,016 m), with Chabre (1,393 m) forming a barrier to the south. The upper valley of the Buëch culminates at the Rocher Rond (2,453 m). The terrain is mainly composed of marl and alluvial deposits, resulting in poor soils.

Traditionally, the Buëch region serves as a passageway between the Durance valley and Grenoble via the Col de la Croix Haute (N75) and between the Rhône Valley and Italy via the route between Lapalud and Briançon (formerly N94). These two routes intersect at Serres, located south of the Bochaine.

== Population ==
The Buëch region encompasses the cantons of Aspres-sur-Buëch, Veynes, Serres, Laragne-Montéglin, and Rosans. Although the canton of Rosans, located to the west, is part of the modern definition of the Buëch region, it is more oriented towards the Baronnies.

These five cantons cover an area of 998 km^{2} and had a combined population of 14,676 in 1999, resulting in a very low population density of 14.7 inhabitants per km^{2}.
