= Diois Mountains =

Mountain range in France

- The massif is at the westernmost part of the Western Alps

Highest point
- Elevation: 2,051 m (6,729 ft)
- Parent peak: Jocou

Naming
- Native name: Massif du Diois (French)

Geography
- Country: France
- Departments: Drôme; Isère
- Region: Auvergne-Rhône-Alpes
- Parent range: French Prealps

Geology
- Rock type(s): Marl, limestone, conglomerate

The Diois Mountains (French: Massif du Diois, pronounced [masif dy diwa]) is a massif of the French Prealps located in the department of Drôme and the extreme south of the department of Isère.

== Geography ==
=== Location ===
This mountainous territory is located to the south of the Diois region, the Drôme river, and the natural and historical region of Dauphiné.

It is surrounded by the Vercors Massif to the north of the Drôme, the Dévoluy Mountains and the Bochaine Mountains to the east of Buëch and the Baronnies Massif to the south of Aigues.

=== Main summits ===
- Jocou, 2,051 m (6,729 ft)
- Belle-Motte, 1,952 m (6,404 ft)
- Toussière, 1,916 m (6,286 ft)
- Mont Barral, 1,903 m (6,243 ft)
- Pare, 1,862 m (6,109 ft)
- Duffre, 1,757 m (5,764 ft)
- Pyramide, 1,734 m (5,689 ft)
- Quigouret, 1,729 m (5,673 ft)
- Luzet, 1,692 m (5,551 ft)
- Serre Chaumille, 1,653 m (5,423 ft)
- Serre de Bouisse, 1,645 m (5,397 ft)
- Bane, 1,643 m (5,390 ft)
- Chauvet, 1,617 m (5,305 ft)
- Servelle, 1,613 m (5,292 ft)
- Montagne d'Angèle, 1,606 m (5,269 ft)
- Trois Becs, 1,589 m (5,213 ft)
- Serre de Rigaud, 1,574 m (5,164 ft)
- Archier, 1,571 m (5,154 ft)
- Boutarinard, 1,570 m (5,150 ft)
- Maraysse, 1,567 m (5,141 ft)
- Jouffan, 1,564 m (5,131 ft)
- Pinchinet, 1,556 m (5,105 ft)
- Tarsimoure, 1,550 m (5,090 ft)
- Puy, 1,550 m (5,090 ft)
- Couspeau, 1,544 m (5,066 ft)
- Casses, 1,528 m (5,013 ft)
- Peyre Grosse, 1,522 m (4,993 ft)
- Greisière, 1,492 m (4,895 ft)
- Praloubeau, 1,476 m (4,843 ft)
- Miélandre, 1,451 m (4,760 ft)
- Ocelon, 1,356 m (4,449 ft)
- Lance, 1,340 m (4,400 ft)
- Eyriau, 1,298 m (4,259 ft)

=== Geology ===
Similar to the Baronnies massif, the Diois region is characterized by mid-altitude limestone mountains, a rock type also abundantly found in the Vercors. In the valleys, sandy-marl soils are predominant. Most of the summits in the area range in altitude from 1,000 to 1,700 meters. The small valleys, sometimes carved into gorges by watercourses, are oriented in various directions, creating a highly compartmentalized terrain.

The elevation increases progressively eastwards.

== Biodiversity ==
The biodiversity of the Diois region reflects both Mediterranean and mountainous influences.

=== Flora ===
The Diois is predominantly covered by forests consisting of downy oak, Scots pine, Austrian pine, common beech, silver fir, common box, common juniper, and laburnum.

In more open areas, common thyme, common lavender and Genista cinerea can be found.

=== Fauna ===
The Diois is home to an abundance of wildlife, including the Alpine chamois, European roe deer, red deer, and Eurasian wild boar. The grey wolf naturally returned to the area in the late 1990s and has since established several known packs.

The forests are inhabited by common genets, pine martens, and beech martens. Along rivers and streams, signs of Eurasian beavers and European otters can be observed, with occasional sightings of these animals.

The highest parts of the massif are inhabited by black grouse, Tengmalm's owls, and Eurasian pygmy owls, alongside more common species like ring ouzels, citril finches, and red crossbills. The dry slopes of Jocou and certain summits in the Diois still host a few pairs of rock partridges.

Local populations of ocellated lizards and yellow-bellied toads are also notable in the Diois.
