= Oze =

Oze may refer to:

== People ==
- Akira Oze (born 1947), Japanese manga artist
- Hiroyuki Oze (1985–2010), Japanese baseball player
- Lajos Őze (1935–1984), Hungarian actor

== Places ==
- Oze, Hautes-Alpes, France
- Oze National Park, Japan
- Oze River, Japan

== Fictional characters ==
- Ikumi Oze, character in Infinite Ryvius
- Maki Oze, character in Fire Force

== Other ==
- 7358 Oze, minor planet
- oze, species of bat also known as Ikonnikov's bat
