= Montrond =

Montrond may refer to the following places in France:

- Montrond, Hautes-Alpes, a commune in the department of Hautes-Alpes
- Montrond, Jura, a commune in the department of Jura
- Montrond-le-Château, a commune in the department of Doubs
- Montrond-les-Bains, a commune in the department of Loire
- Saint-Amand-Montrond, a commune in the department of Cher
