= Montjay =

Montjay may refer to the following places in France:

- Montjay, Hautes-Alpes, a commune in the department of Hautes-Alpes
- Montjay, Saône-et-Loire, a commune in the department of Saône-et-Loire
