= Montclus =

Montclus is the name of the following communes in France:

- Montclus, Gard, in the Gard department
- Montclus, Hautes-Alpes, in the Hautes-Alpes department
