= Saint-André-de-Rosans =

- Commune
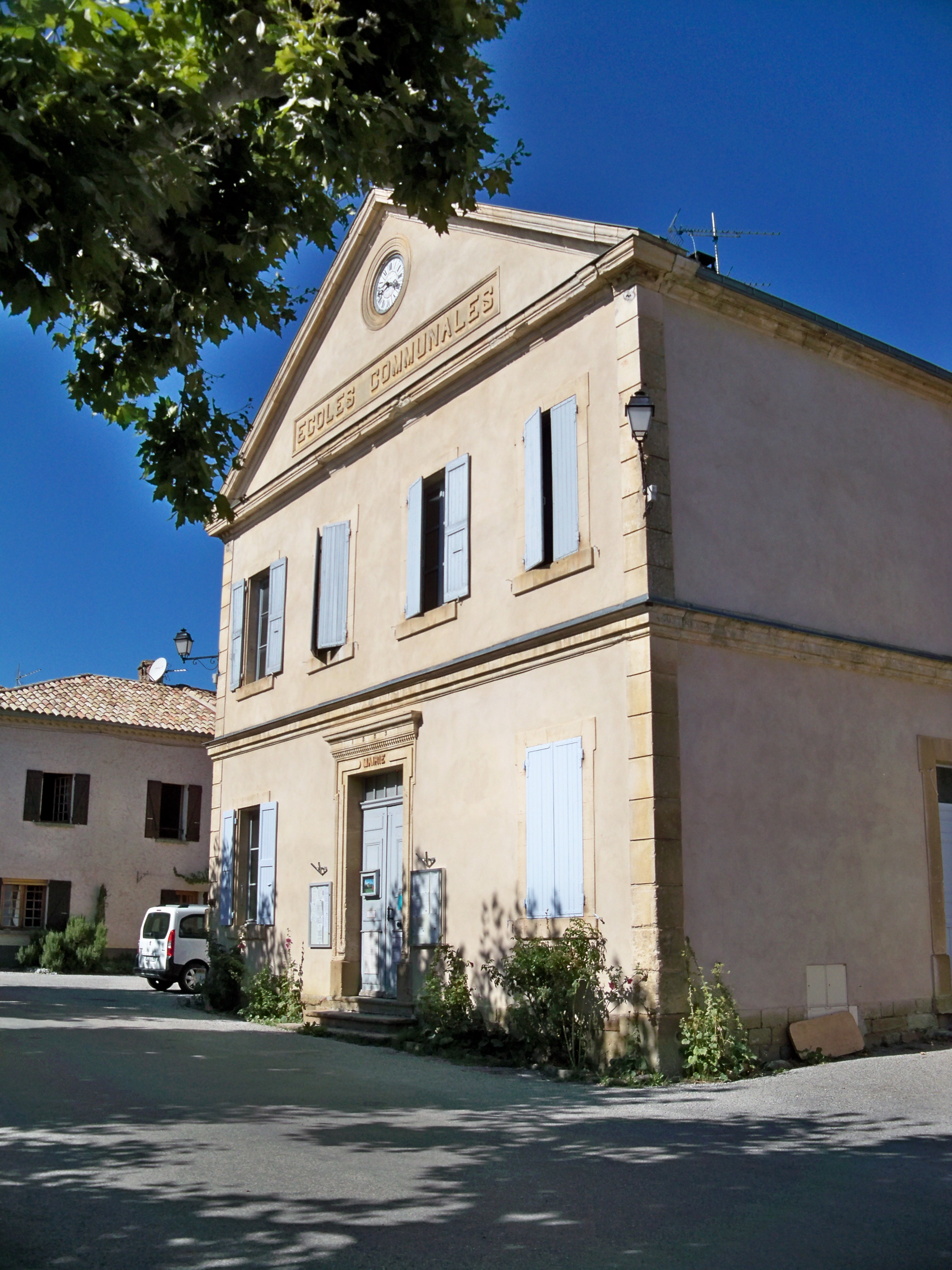
- The school of Saint-André-de-Rosans

- Coat of arms
- Location of Saint-André-de-Rosans
- Location within France Location within Provence-Alpes-Côte d'Azur
- Coordinates: 44°22′41″N 5°30′55″E
- Country: France
- Region: Provence-Alpes-Côte d'Azur
- Department: Hautes-Alpes
- Arrondissement: Gap
- Canton: Serres

Government
  - Mayor (2026–32): Cécile Liotard
- Area^{1}: 36.61 km^{2} (14.14 sq mi)
- Elevation: 747 m (2,451 ft)
- Highest elevation: 1,213 m (3,980 ft)
- Lowest elevation: 557 m (1,827 ft)
- Population (2023): 153
  - Density: 4.18/km^{2} (10.8/sq mi)
- Time zone: UTC+01:00 (CET)
  - Summer (DST): UTC+02:00 (CEST)
- INSEE/Postal code: 05129 /05150
- ^{1} French Land Register data, which excludes lakes, ponds, glaciers > 1 km^{2} (0.386 sq mi or 247 acres) and river estuaries.

Saint-André-de-Rosans (French pronunciation: [sɛ̃.t‿ɑ̃dʁe də ʁozɑ̃], literally Saint-André of Rosans; Occitan: Sant Andreu de Rosans) is a commune in the Hautes-Alpes department in southeastern France.

== Population ==
Historical population
Year	Pop.	±% p.a.
1968	137	—
1975	119	−1.99%
1982	123	+0.47%
1990	141	+1.72%
1999	139	−0.16%
2007	149	+0.87%
2012	143	−0.82%
2017	151	+1.09%
2023	153	+0.22%
Source: INSEE

== See also ==
- Communes of the Hautes-Alpes department
