= Communes of the Hautes-Alpes department =

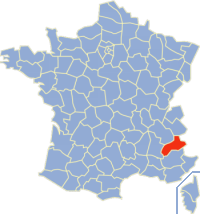

The following is a list of the 162 communes of the Hautes-Alpes department of France.

The communes cooperate in the following intercommunalities (as of 2025):

- Communauté d'agglomération Gap-Tallard-Durance (partly)
- Communauté de communes du Briançonnais
- Communauté de communes Buëch Dévoluy
- Communauté de communes Champsaur-Valgaudemar
- Communauté de communes du Guillestrois et du Queyras
- Communauté de communes du Pays des Écrins
- Communauté de communes de Serre-Ponçon (partly)
- Communauté de communes Serre-Ponçon Val d'Avance (partly)
- Communauté de communes du Sisteronais Buëch (partly)

INSEE code	Postal code	Commune
05001	05460	Abriès-Ristolas
05003	05470	Aiguilles
05004	05260	Ancelle
05006	05120	L'Argentière-la-Bessée
05007	05350	Arvieux
05008	05140	Aspremont
05009	05800	Aspres-lès-Corps
05010	05140	Aspres-sur-Buëch
05039	05500, 05800	Aubessagne
05011	05230	Avançon
05012	05200	Baratier
05013	05110	Barcillonnette
05014	05300	Barret-sur-Méouge
05016	05700	La Bâtie-Montsaléon
05017	05230	La Bâtie-Neuve
05018	05000	La Bâtie-Vieille
05019	05140	La Beaume
05021	05700	Le Bersac
05022	05190	Bréziers
05023	05100	Briançon
05025	05500	Buissard
05026	05600	Ceillac
05027	05100	Cervières
05028	05400	Chabestan
05029	05260	Chabottes
05031	05310	Champcella
05032	05260	Champoléon
05033	05700	Chanousse
05064	05800	La Chapelle-en-Valgaudémar
05035	05400	Châteauneuf-d'Oze
05036	05380	Châteauroux-les-Alpes
05037	05000	Châteauvieux
05038	05350	Château-Ville-Vieille
05040	05230	Chorges
05044	05200	Crévoux
05045	05200	Crots
05139	05250	Dévoluy
05046	05200	Embrun
05047	26560	Éourres
05048	05700	L'Épine
05049	05110	Esparron
05050	05190	Espinasses
05051	05700	Étoile-Saint-Cyrice
05052	05600	Eygliers
05054	05500	La Fare-en-Champsaur
05055	05140	La Faurie
05056	05260	Forest-Saint-Julien
05057	05130	Fouillouse
05058	05310	Freissinières
05059	05000	La Freissinouse
05060	05400	Furmeyer
05061	05000	Gap
05053	05300	Garde-Colombe
05062	05800	Le Glaizil
05063	05320	La Grave
05065	05600	Guillestre
05066	05140	La Haute-Beaume
05068	05130	Jarjayes
05070	05300	Laragne-Montéglin
05071	05110	Lardier-et-Valença
05072	05500	Laye
05073	05300	Lazer
05074	05130	Lettret
05075	05400	Manteyer
05076	05700	Méreuil
05077	05350	Molines-en-Queyras
05078	05110	Monêtier-Allemont
05079	05220	Le Monêtier-les-Bains
05080	05140	Montbrand
05081	05700	Montclus
05082	05600	Mont-Dauphin
05084	05230	Montgardin
05085	05100	Montgenèvre
05086	05150	Montjay
05087	05400	Montmaur
05089	05700	Montrond
05090	05500	La Motte-en-Champsaur
05091	05150	Moydans
05092	05000	Neffes
05093	05100	Névache

INSEE code	Postal code	Commune
05094	05700	Nossage-et-Bénévent
05095	05500	Le Noyer
05096	05170	Orcières
05097	05700	Orpierre
05098	05200	Les Orres
05099	05400	Oze
05100	05000	Pelleautier
05102	05700	La Piarre
05103	05300	Le Poët
05104	05500	Poligny
05106	05230	Prunières
05107	05100	Puy-Saint-André
05108	05200	Puy-Saint-Eusèbe
05109	05100	Puy-Saint-Pierre
05110	05290	Puy-Saint-Vincent
05111	05200	Puy-Sanières
05112	05400	Rabou
05113	05000	Rambaud
05114	05160	Réallon
05115	05190	Remollon
05116	05600	Réotier
05117	05150	Ribeyret
05119	05600	Risoul
05121	05190	Rochebrune
05122	05310	La Roche-de-Rame
05123	05400	La Roche-des-Arnauds
05124	05000	La Rochette
05126	05150	Rosans
05127	05190	Rousset-Serre-Ponçon
05128	05200	Saint-André-d'Embrun
05129	05150	Saint-André-de-Rosans
05130	05160	Saint-Apollinaire
05131	05400	Saint-Auban-d'Oze
05132	05500	Saint-Bonnet-en-Champsaur
05133	05330	Saint-Chaffrey
05134	05600	Saint-Clément-sur-Durance
05136	05600	Saint-Crépin
05135	05700	Sainte-Colombe
05140	05130	Saint-Étienne-le-Laus
05142	05800	Saint-Firmin
05144	05800	Saint-Jacques-en-Valgodemard
05145	05260	Saint-Jean-Saint-Nicolas
05146	05140	Saint-Julien-en-Beauchêne
05147	05500	Saint-Julien-en-Champsaur
05148	05500	Saint-Laurent-du-Cros
05149	05260	Saint-Léger-les-Mélèzes
05151	05120	Saint-Martin-de-Queyrières
05152	05800	Saint-Maurice-en-Valgodemard
05153	05260	Saint-Michel-de-Chaillol
05155	05300	Saint-Pierre-Avez
05154	05140	Saint-Pierre-d'Argençon
05156	05200	Saint-Sauveur
05157	05350	Saint-Véran
05158	05400	Le Saix
05159	05300	Saléon
05160	05300	Salérans
05161	05240	La Salle-les-Alpes
05162	05110	La Saulce
05163	05160	Le Sauze-du-Lac
05164	05160	Savines-le-Lac
05165	05700	Savournon
05166	05700	Serres
05167	05700	Sigottier
05168	05130	Sigoyer
05169	05150	Sorbiers
05170	05130	Tallard
05171	05190	Théus
05172	05700	Trescléoux
05173	05300	Upaix
05118	05300	Val Buëch-Méouge
05174	05100	Val-des-Prés
05024	05150	Valdoule
05101	05340	Vallouise-Pelvoux
05176	05130	Valserres
05177	05560	Vars
05178	05300	Ventavon
05179	05400	Veynes
05180	05120	Les Vigneaux
05181	05480	Villar-d'Arêne
05182	05800	Villar-Loubière
05183	05100	Villar-Saint-Pancrace
05184	05110	Vitrolles
