= Le Bersac =

- Commune
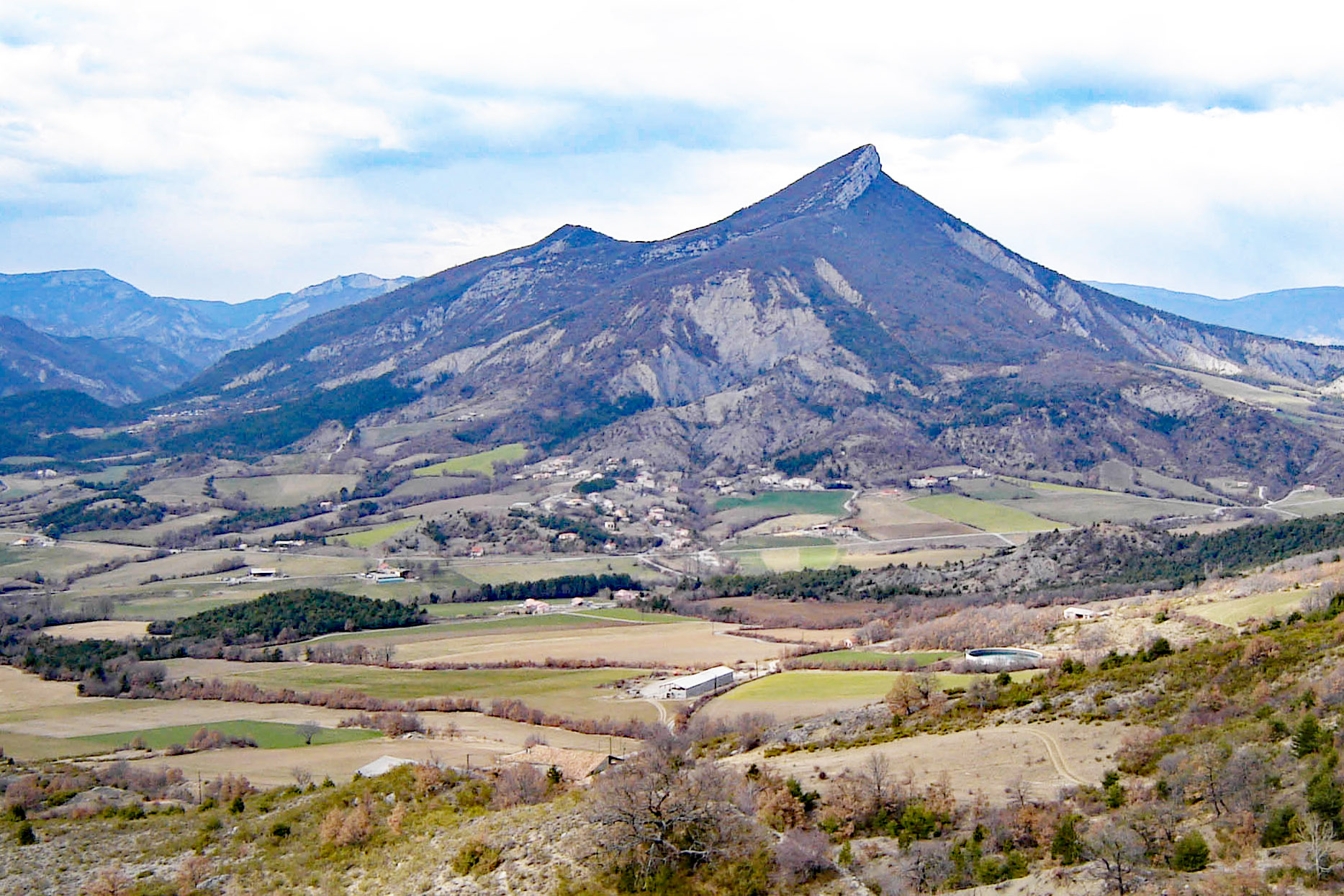

- Coat of arms
- Location of Le Bersac
- Location within France Location within Provence-Alpes-Côte d'Azur
- Coordinates: 44°24′45″N 5°45′02″E
- Country: France
- Region: Provence-Alpes-Côte d'Azur
- Department: Hautes-Alpes
- Arrondissement: Gap
- Canton: Serres

Government
  - Mayor (2026–32): Dominique Drouillard
- Area^{1}: 8.02 km^{2} (3.10 sq mi)
- Elevation: 700 m (2,300 ft)
- Highest elevation: 1,299 m (4,262 ft)
- Lowest elevation: 636 m (2,087 ft)
- Population (2023): 146
  - Density: 18.2/km^{2} (47.1/sq mi)
- Time zone: UTC+01:00 (CET)
  - Summer (DST): UTC+02:00 (CEST)
- INSEE/Postal code: 05021 /05700
- ^{1} French Land Register data, which excludes lakes, ponds, glaciers > 1 km^{2} (0.386 sq mi or 247 acres) and river estuaries.

Le Bersac (French pronunciation: [lə bɛʁsak]; Occitan: Lo Bersac) is a commune in the Hautes-Alpes department in southeastern France.

== Population ==
Historical population
Year	Pop.	±% p.a.
1968	112	—
1975	102	−1.33%
1982	118	+2.10%
1990	97	−2.42%
1999	134	+3.66%
2007	151	+1.50%
2012	151	+0.00%
2017	148	−0.40%
2023	146	−0.23%
Source: INSEE

== Tourism ==
Although now emerging as a preferred tourist destination, the area has retained its charm and character. Restaurants, fishing, hiking, swimming, off-road exploring, and cross-country skiing are just some of the many activities available. The favourable weather patterns and local alpine ski areas make this a top year-round destination.

== See also ==
- Communes of the Hautes-Alpes department
