= Sigottier =

- Commune
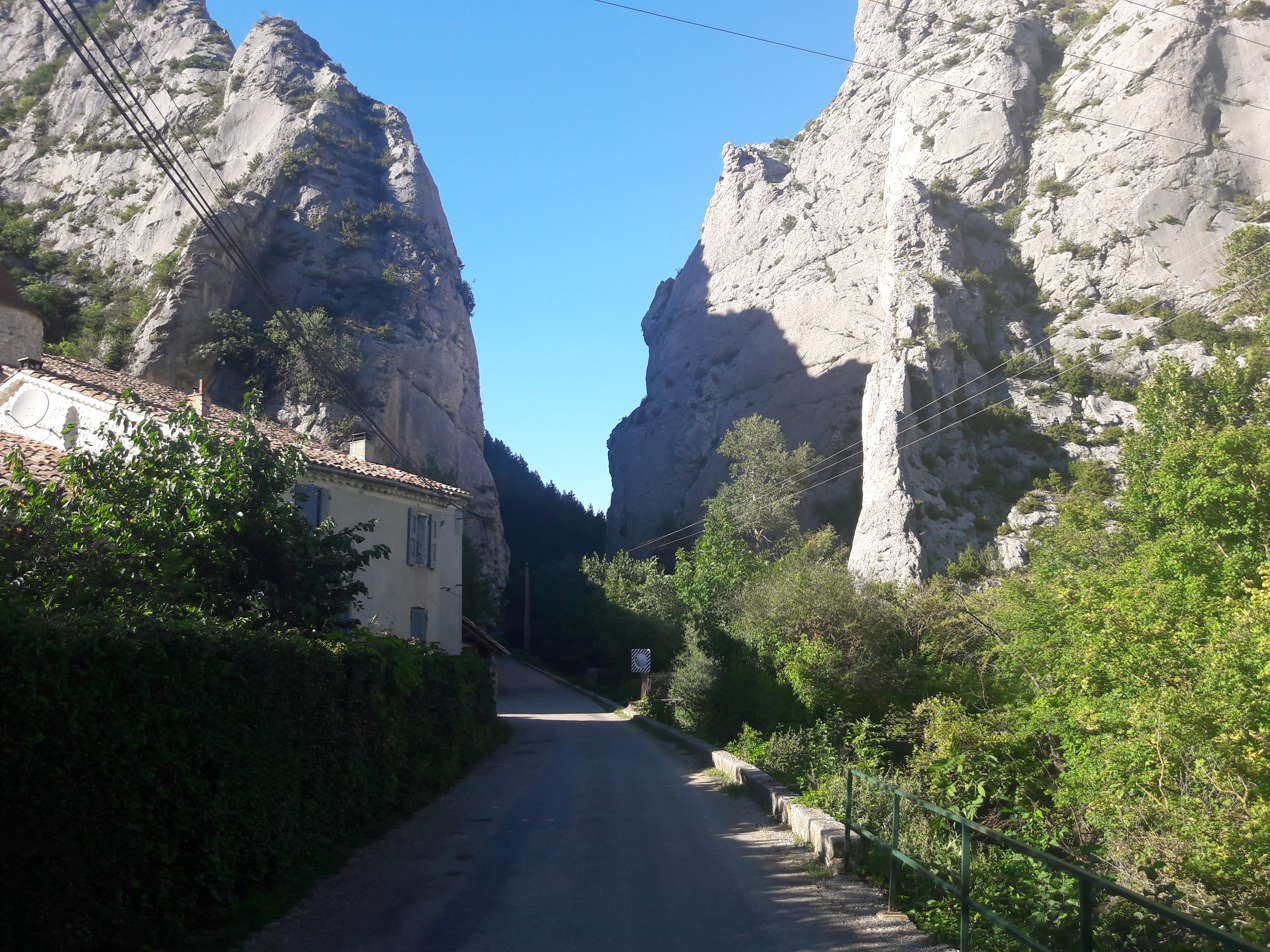
- Location of Sigottier
- Location within France Location within Provence-Alpes-Côte d'Azur
- Coordinates: 44°27′21″N 5°41′34″E
- Country: France
- Region: Provence-Alpes-Côte d'Azur
- Department: Hautes-Alpes
- Arrondissement: Gap
- Canton: Serres

Government
  - Mayor (2026–32): Jean Depeyre
- Area^{1}: 25.33 km^{2} (9.78 sq mi)
- Elevation: 720 m (2,360 ft)
- Highest elevation: 1,634 m (5,361 ft)
- Lowest elevation: 672 m (2,205 ft)
- Population (2023): 82
  - Density: 3.2/km^{2} (8.4/sq mi)
- Time zone: UTC+01:00 (CET)
  - Summer (DST): UTC+02:00 (CEST)
- INSEE/Postal code: 05167 /05700
- ^{1} French Land Register data, which excludes lakes, ponds, glaciers > 1 km^{2} (0.386 sq mi or 247 acres) and river estuaries.

Sigottier (French pronunciation: [siɡɔtje]; Occitan: Sigotier) is a commune in the Hautes-Alpes department in southeastern France.

== Population ==
Historical population
Year	Pop.	±% p.a.
1968	81	—
1975	66	−2.88%
1982	57	−2.07%
1990	69	+2.42%
1999	74	+0.78%
2007	64	−1.80%
2012	83	+5.34%
2017	92	+2.08%
2023	82	−1.90%
Source: INSEE

== See also ==
- Communes of the Hautes-Alpes department
