= Le Saix =

- Commune
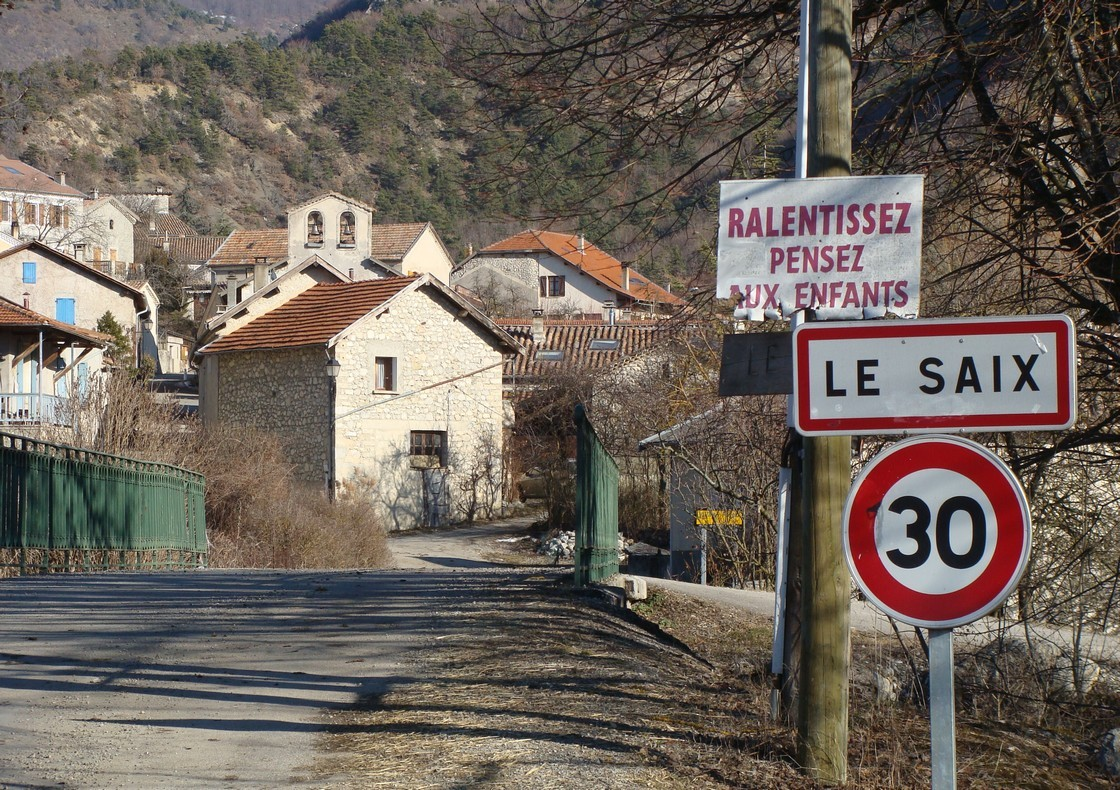
- The entrance to the village in Le Saix

- Coat of arms
- Location of Le Saix
- Location within France Location within Provence-Alpes-Côte d'Azur
- Coordinates: 44°28′34″N 5°49′28″E
- Country: France
- Region: Provence-Alpes-Côte d'Azur
- Department: Hautes-Alpes
- Arrondissement: Gap
- Canton: Serres

Government
  - Mayor (2026–32): Olivier Regord
- Area^{1}: 22.15 km^{2} (8.55 sq mi)
- Elevation: 813 m (2,667 ft)
- Highest elevation: 1,830 m (6,000 ft)
- Lowest elevation: 774 m (2,539 ft)
- Population (2023): 126
  - Density: 5.69/km^{2} (14.7/sq mi)
- Time zone: UTC+01:00 (CET)
  - Summer (DST): UTC+02:00 (CEST)
- INSEE/Postal code: 05158 /05400
- ^{1} French Land Register data, which excludes lakes, ponds, glaciers > 1 km^{2} (0.386 sq mi or 247 acres) and river estuaries.

Le Saix is a commune in the Hautes-Alpes department in southeastern France.

== History ==
Circa 2500 BCE, humans settled on the banks of the river valley that is a northern tributary of the River Maraize on the Saix proper, as evidenced by bits of blades, sickles, arrowheads, scrapers and shards of flint. Using such evidence as a jumping-off point, French archaeologists have chronicled the development of human culture in the immediate area; among the discovered items have been polished Stone Age axes and Celtic hatchets, bracelets and necklaces of pearls and amber, as well as many relatively sophisticated tools indicative of the arrival of the Bronze Age. Flat tiles, as well as fragments of pottery and coins dating back to the times of Maximinus Thrax provide evidence of the town's possible Roman origins.

== Population ==
Historical population
Year	Pop.	±% p.a.
1968	90	—
1975	81	−1.49%
1982	77	−0.72%
1990	64	−2.29%
1999	79	+2.37%
2007	87	+1.21%
2012	102	+3.23%
2017	107	+0.96%
2023	126	+2.76%
Source: INSEE

== See also ==
- Communes of the Hautes-Alpes department
