= Saint-Auban-d'Oze =

- Commune
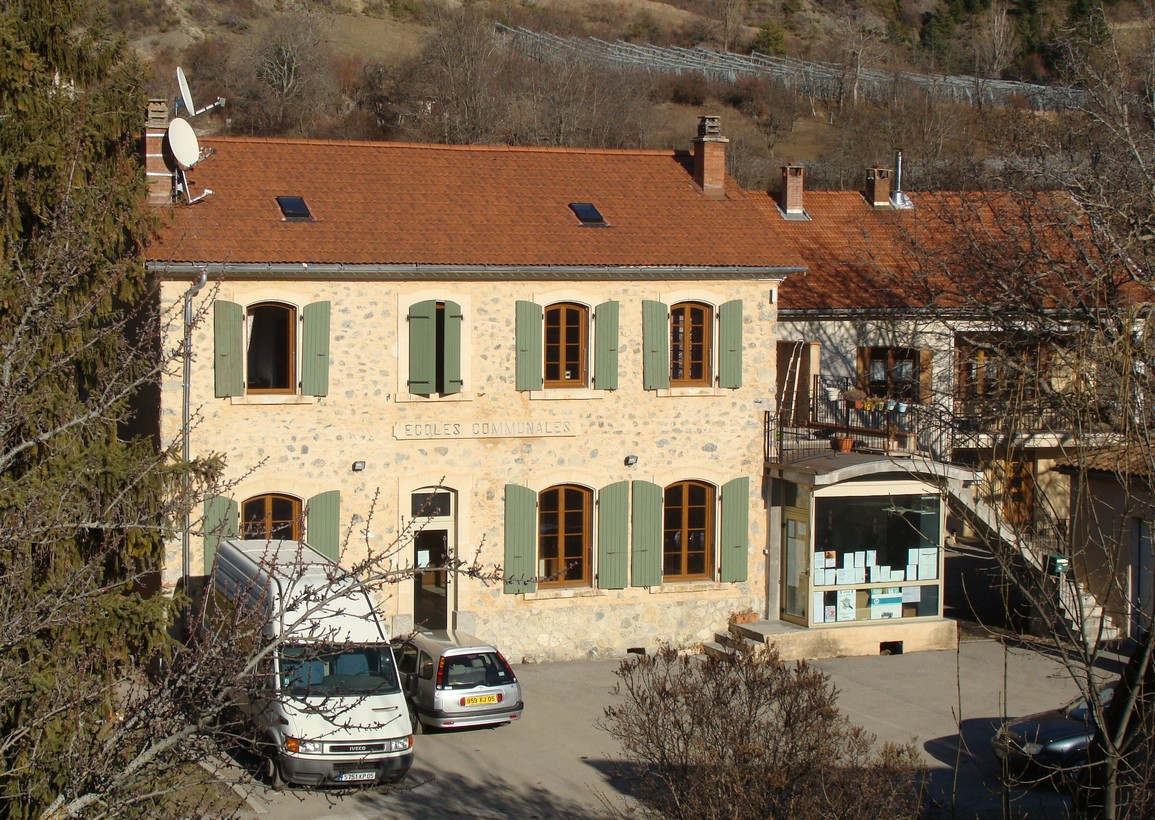
- The school in Saint-Auban-d'Oze
- Location of Saint-Auban-d'Oze
- Location within France Location within Provence-Alpes-Côte d'Azur
- Coordinates: 44°29′48″N 5°50′50″E
- Country: France
- Region: Provence-Alpes-Côte d'Azur
- Department: Hautes-Alpes
- Arrondissement: Gap
- Canton: Serres

Government
  - Mayor (2026–32): Jean-Marie Gueyraud
- Area^{1}: 13.21 km^{2} (5.10 sq mi)
- Elevation: 850 m (2,790 ft)
- Highest elevation: 1,603 m (5,259 ft)
- Lowest elevation: 848 m (2,782 ft)
- Population (2023): 75
  - Density: 5.7/km^{2} (15/sq mi)
- Time zone: UTC+01:00 (CET)
  - Summer (DST): UTC+02:00 (CEST)
- INSEE/Postal code: 05131 /05400
- ^{1} French Land Register data, which excludes lakes, ponds, glaciers > 1 km^{2} (0.386 sq mi or 247 acres) and river estuaries.

Saint-Auban-d'Oze (French pronunciation: [sɛ̃.t‿oban doz]; Occitan: Sant Auban d'Auza) is a commune in the Hautes-Alpes department in southeastern France.

== Population ==
Historical population
Year	Pop.	±% p.a.
1968	52	—
1975	40	−3.68%
1982	59	+5.71%
1990	64	+1.02%
1999	67	+0.51%
2007	67	+0.00%
2012	71	+1.17%
2017	90	+4.86%
2023	75	−2.99%
Source: INSEE

== See also ==
- Communes of the Hautes-Alpes department
