= La Piarre =

- Commune
- Location of La Piarre
- Location within France Location within Provence-Alpes-Côte d'Azur
- Coordinates: 44°28′34″N 5°39′23″E
- Country: France
- Region: Provence-Alpes-Côte d'Azur
- Department: Hautes-Alpes
- Arrondissement: Gap
- Canton: Serres

Government
  - Mayor (2026–32): Olivier Reynaud
- Area^{1}: 21.67 km^{2} (8.37 sq mi)
- Elevation: 880 m (2,890 ft)
- Highest elevation: 1,760 m (5,770 ft)
- Lowest elevation: 760 m (2,490 ft)
- Population (2023): 82
  - Density: 3.8/km^{2} (9.8/sq mi)
- Time zone: UTC+01:00 (CET)
  - Summer (DST): UTC+02:00 (CEST)
- INSEE/Postal code: 05102 /05700
- ^{1} French Land Register data, which excludes lakes, ponds, glaciers > 1 km^{2} (0.386 sq mi or 247 acres) and river estuaries.

La Piarre (French pronunciation: [la pjaʁ]; Occitan: La Piara) is a commune in the Hautes-Alpes department in southeastern France.

== Population ==
Historical population
Year	Pop.	±% p.a.
1968	77	—
1975	62	−3.05%
1982	61	−0.23%
1990	57	−0.84%
1999	63	+1.12%
2007	92	+4.85%
2012	90	−0.44%
2017	93	+0.66%
2023	82	−2.08%
Source: INSEE

== See also ==
- Communes of the Hautes-Alpes department
