= Chabestan =

- Commune
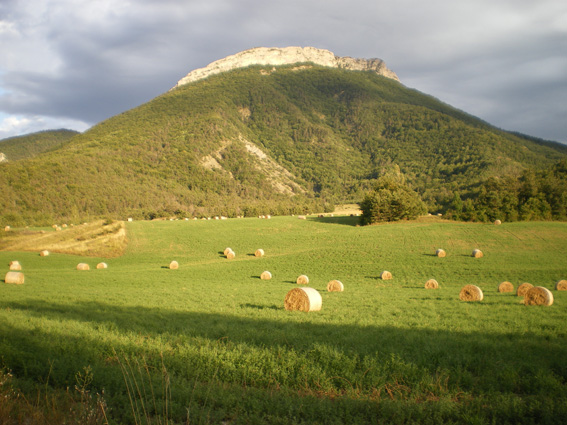
- The Roc de Longue Dent

- Coat of arms
- Location of Chabestan
- Location within France Location within Provence-Alpes-Côte d'Azur
- Coordinates: 44°28′44″N 5°47′02″E
- Country: France
- Region: Provence-Alpes-Côte d'Azur
- Department: Hautes-Alpes
- Arrondissement: Gap
- Canton: Serres
- Intercommunality: Buëch-Dévoluy

Government
  - Mayor (2026–32): Anne-Marie Gros
- Area^{1}: 12.2 km^{2} (4.7 sq mi)
- Elevation: 734 m (2,408 ft)
- Highest elevation: 1,360 m (4,460 ft)
- Lowest elevation: 715 m (2,346 ft)
- Population (2023): 173
  - Density: 14.2/km^{2} (36.7/sq mi)
- Time zone: UTC+01:00 (CET)
  - Summer (DST): UTC+02:00 (CEST)
- INSEE/Postal code: 05028 /05400
- ^{1} French Land Register data, which excludes lakes, ponds, glaciers > 1 km^{2} (0.386 sq mi or 247 acres) and river estuaries.

Chabestan (French pronunciation: [ʃabɛstɑ̃]; Occitan: Chabestanh) is a commune in the Hautes-Alpes department in southeastern France.

== Population ==
Historical population
Year	Pop.	±% p.a.
1968	113	—
1975	101	−1.59%
1982	105	+0.56%
1990	112	+0.81%
1999	126	+1.32%
2007	120	−0.61%
2012	151	+4.70%
2017	129	−3.10%
2023	173	+5.01%
Source: INSEE

== See also ==
- Communes of the Hautes-Alpes department
