= Méreuil =

- Commune
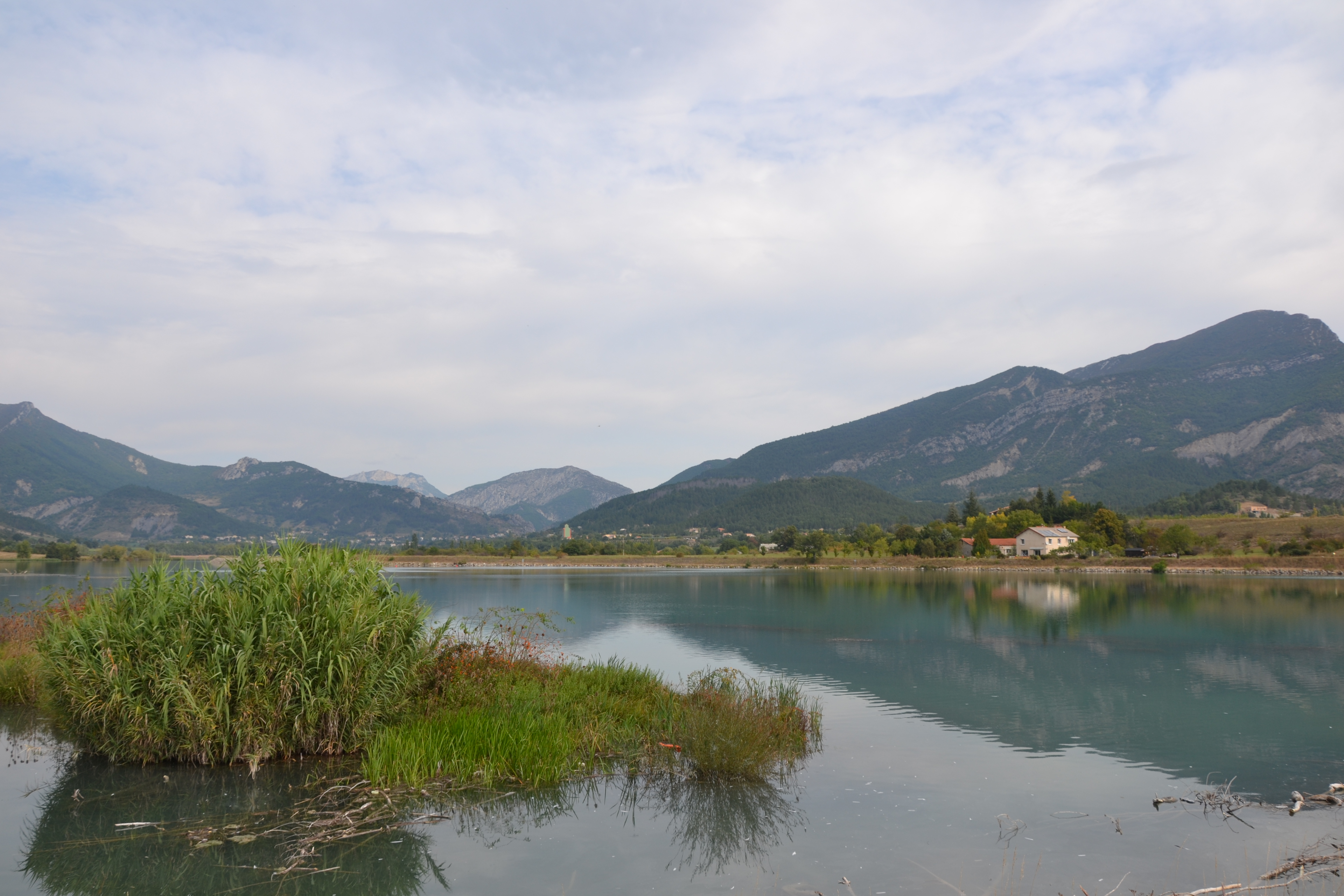
- Location of Méreuil
- Location within France Location within Provence-Alpes-Côte d'Azur
- Coordinates: 44°23′16″N 5°43′52″E
- Country: France
- Region: Provence-Alpes-Côte d'Azur
- Department: Hautes-Alpes
- Arrondissement: Gap
- Canton: Serres

Government
  - Mayor (2026–32): Annick Reynaud-Frey
- Area^{1}: 10.61 km^{2} (4.10 sq mi)
- Elevation: 660 m (2,170 ft)
- Highest elevation: 1,546 m (5,072 ft)
- Lowest elevation: 610 m (2,000 ft)
- Population (2023): 108
  - Density: 10.2/km^{2} (26.4/sq mi)
- Time zone: UTC+01:00 (CET)
  - Summer (DST): UTC+02:00 (CEST)
- INSEE/Postal code: 05076 /05700
- ^{1} French Land Register data, which excludes lakes, ponds, glaciers > 1 km^{2} (0.386 sq mi or 247 acres) and river estuaries.

Méreuil (French pronunciation: [meʁœj]; Occitan: Mereulh) is a commune in the Hautes-Alpes department in southeastern France.

== Population ==
Historical population
Year	Pop.	±% p.a.
1968	95	—
1975	80	−2.43%
1982	83	+0.53%
1990	104	+2.86%
1999	78	−3.15%
2007	83	+0.78%
2012	88	+1.18%
2017	84	−0.93%
2023	108	+4.28%
Source: INSEE

== See also ==
- Communes of the Hautes-Alpes department
