= L'Épine, Hautes-Alpes =

L'Épine
- Commune
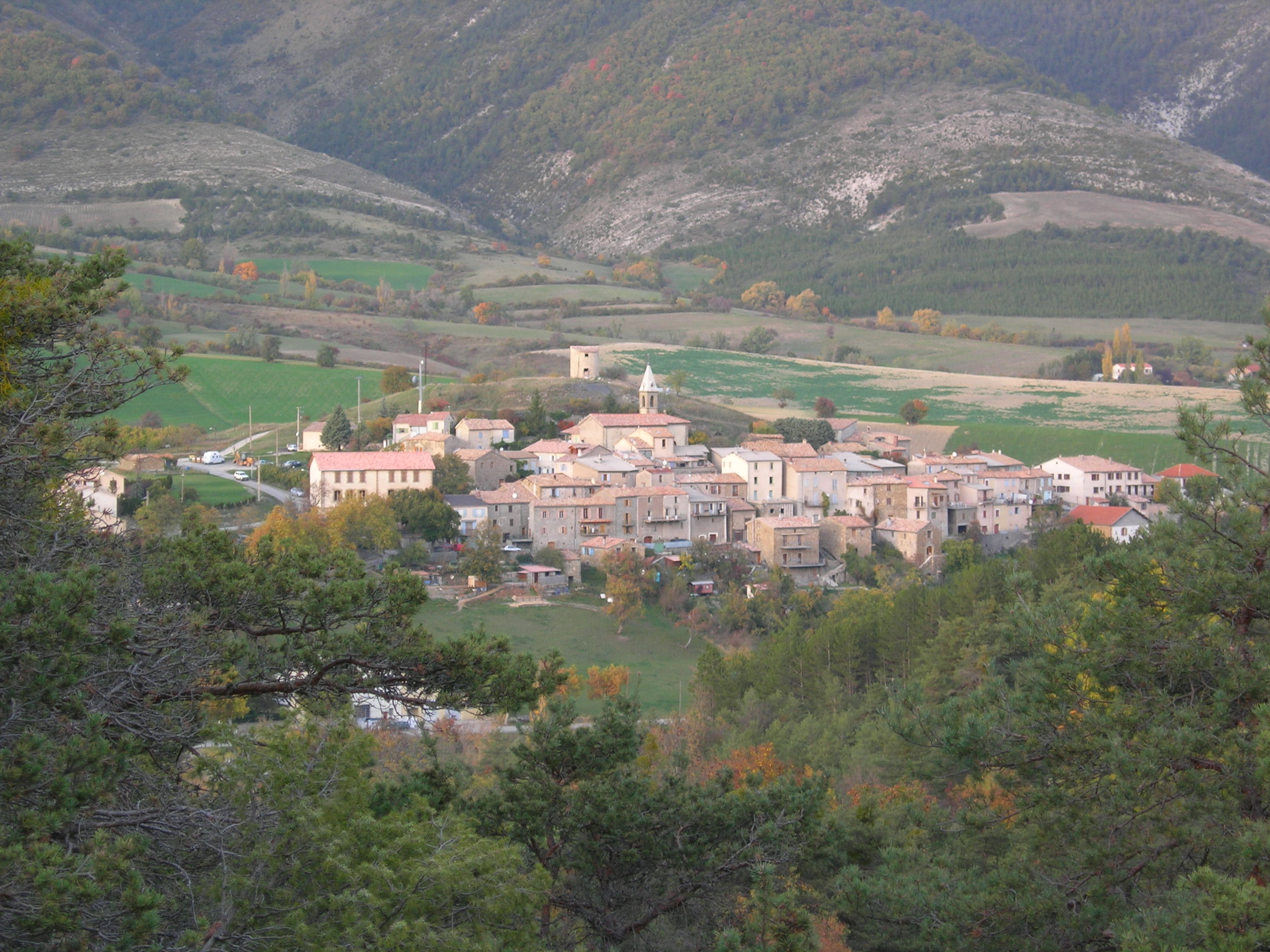

- Coat of arms
- Location of L'Épine
- Location within France Location within Provence-Alpes-Côte d'Azur
- Coordinates: 44°25′05″N 5°37′03″E
- Country: France
- Region: Provence-Alpes-Côte d'Azur
- Department: Hautes-Alpes
- Arrondissement: Gap
- Canton: Serres

Government
  - Mayor (2026–32): Martine Pech-Rabasse
- Area^{1}: 33.47 km^{2} (12.92 sq mi)
- Elevation: 840 m (2,760 ft)
- Highest elevation: 1,760 m (5,770 ft)
- Lowest elevation: 785 m (2,575 ft)
- Population (2023): 200
  - Density: 6.0/km^{2} (15/sq mi)
- Time zone: UTC+01:00 (CET)
  - Summer (DST): UTC+02:00 (CEST)
- INSEE/Postal code: 05048 /05700
- ^{1} French Land Register data, which excludes lakes, ponds, glaciers > 1 km^{2} (0.386 sq mi or 247 acres) and river estuaries.

L'Épine (French pronunciation: [lepin]; Occitan: L'Espina) is a commune in the Hautes-Alpes department in southeastern France.

== Population ==
Historical population
Year	Pop.	±% p.a.
1968	182	—
1975	155	−2.27%
1982	141	−1.34%
1990	148	+0.61%
1999	154	+0.44%
2007	175	+1.61%
2012	185	+1.12%
2017	196	+1.16%
2023	200	+0.34%
Source: INSEE

== See also ==
- Communes of the Hautes-Alpes department
