= Montbrand =

- Commune
- Location of Montbrand
- Location within France Location within Provence-Alpes-Côte d'Azur
- Coordinates: 44°35′26″N 5°40′59″E
- Country: France
- Region: Provence-Alpes-Côte d'Azur
- Department: Hautes-Alpes
- Arrondissement: Gap
- Canton: Serres

Government
  - Mayor (2026–32): Cyrille Tasson
- Area^{1}: 25.03 km^{2} (9.66 sq mi)
- Elevation: 980 m (3,220 ft)
- Highest elevation: 1,728 m (5,669 ft)
- Lowest elevation: 846 m (2,776 ft)
- Population (2023): 75
  - Density: 3.0/km^{2} (7.8/sq mi)
- Time zone: UTC+01:00 (CET)
  - Summer (DST): UTC+02:00 (CEST)
- INSEE/Postal code: 05080 /05140
- ^{1} French Land Register data, which excludes lakes, ponds, glaciers > 1 km^{2} (0.386 sq mi or 247 acres) and river estuaries.

Montbrand (French pronunciation: [mɔ̃bʁɑ̃]) is a commune in the Hautes-Alpes department in southeastern France.

== Population ==
Historical population
| Year | Pop. | ±% p.a. |
|---|---|---|
| 1968 | 61 | — |
| 1975 | 57 | −0.96% |
| 1982 | 48 | −2.43% |
| 1990 | 49 | +0.26% |
| 1999 | 64 | +3.01% |
| 2007 | 52 | −2.56% |
| 2012 | 67 | +5.20% |
| 2017 | 62 | −1.54% |
| 2023 | 75 | +3.22% |
Source: INSEE

== See also ==
- Communes of the Hautes-Alpes department
