= Saléon =

Administrative division in Provence-Alpes-Côte d'Azur, France

- Commune
- Coat of arms
- Location of Saléon
- Location within France Location within Provence-Alpes-Côte d'Azur
- Coordinates: 44°20′25″N 5°46′35″E
- Country: France
- Region: Provence-Alpes-Côte d'Azur
- Department: Hautes-Alpes
- Arrondissement: Gap
- Canton: Serres

Government
  - Mayor (2026–32): Pascal Lombard
- Area^{1}: 9.86 km^{2} (3.81 sq mi)
- Elevation: 600 m (2,000 ft)
- Highest elevation: 1,280 m (4,200 ft)
- Lowest elevation: 557 m (1,827 ft)
- Population (2023): 79
  - Density: 8.0/km^{2} (21/sq mi)
- Time zone: UTC+01:00 (CET)
  - Summer (DST): UTC+02:00 (CEST)
- INSEE/Postal code: 05159 /05300
- ^{1} French Land Register data, which excludes lakes, ponds, glaciers > 1 km^{2} (0.386 sq mi or 247 acres) and river estuaries.

Saléon (French pronunciation: [saleɔ̃]; Occitan: Saleon) is a commune in the Hautes-Alpes department in southeastern France.

== Population ==
Historical population
Year	Pop.	±% p.a.
1968	46	—
1975	43	−0.96%
1982	51	+2.47%
1990	47	−1.02%
1999	69	+4.36%
2007	75	+1.05%
2012	93	+4.40%
2017	91	−0.43%
2023	79	−2.33%
Source: INSEE

== See also ==
- Communes of the Hautes-Alpes department
