= Aspremont, Hautes-Alpes =

Aspremont
- Commune
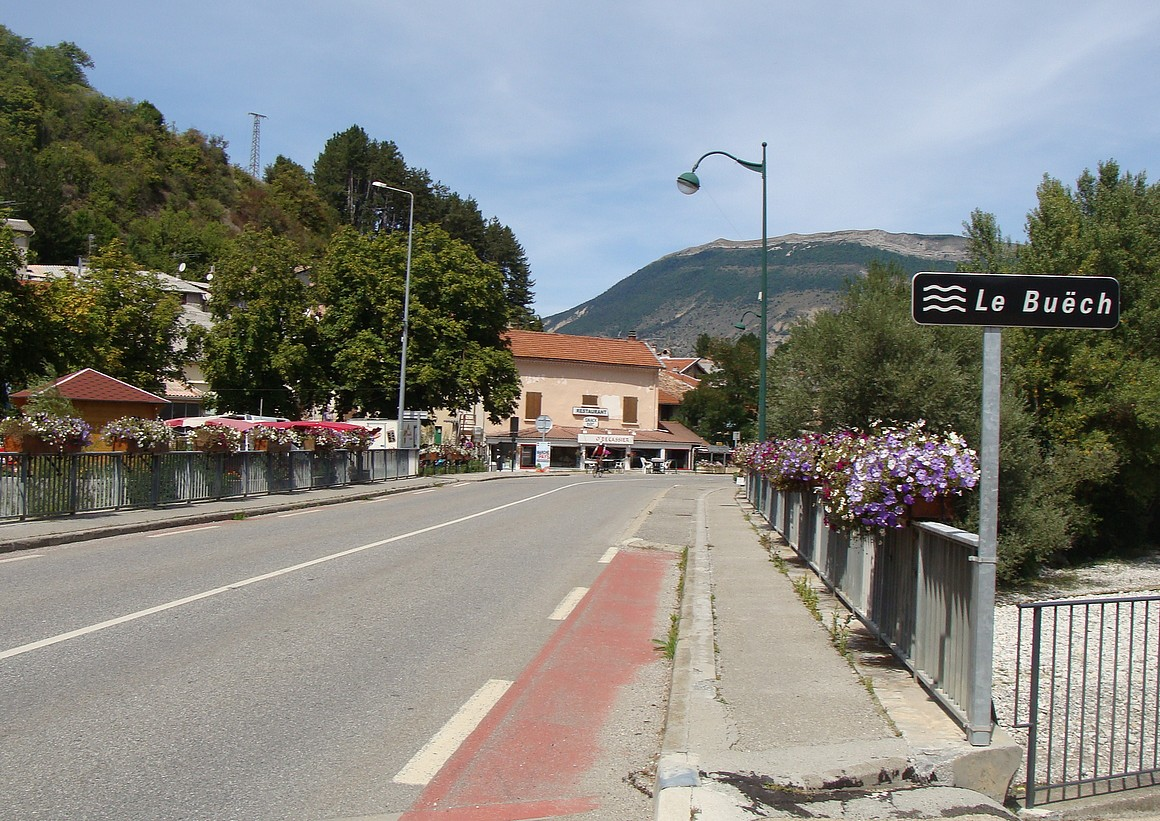
- The bridge of the highway (formerly N75) over the River Buëch in Aspremont

- Coat of arms
- Location of Aspremont
- Location within France Location within Provence-Alpes-Côte d'Azur
- Coordinates: 44°29′36″N 5°43′42″E
- Country: France
- Region: Provence-Alpes-Côte d'Azur
- Department: Hautes-Alpes
- Arrondissement: Gap
- Canton: Serres
- Intercommunality: Buëch Dévoluy

Government
  - Mayor (2026–32): Jacques Francou
- Area^{1}: 18.52 km^{2} (7.15 sq mi)
- Elevation: 715 m (2,346 ft)
- Highest elevation: 1,378 m (4,521 ft)
- Lowest elevation: 696 m (2,283 ft)
- Population (2023): 364
  - Density: 19.7/km^{2} (50.9/sq mi)
- Time zone: UTC+01:00 (CET)
  - Summer (DST): UTC+02:00 (CEST)
- INSEE/Postal code: 05008 /05140
- ^{1} French Land Register data, which excludes lakes, ponds, glaciers > 1 km^{2} (0.386 sq mi or 247 acres) and river estuaries.

Aspremont (French pronunciation: [aspʁəmɔ̃]) is a commune in the Hautes-Alpes department in southeastern France.

== Population ==
Historical population
Year	Pop.	±% p.a.
1968	191	—
1975	182	−0.69%
1982	196	+1.06%
1990	216	+1.22%
1999	238	+1.08%
2007	303	+3.06%
2012	327	+1.54%
2017	358	+1.83%
2023	364	+0.28%
Source: INSEE

== See also ==
- Communes of the Hautes-Alpes department
