= Moydans =

- Commune
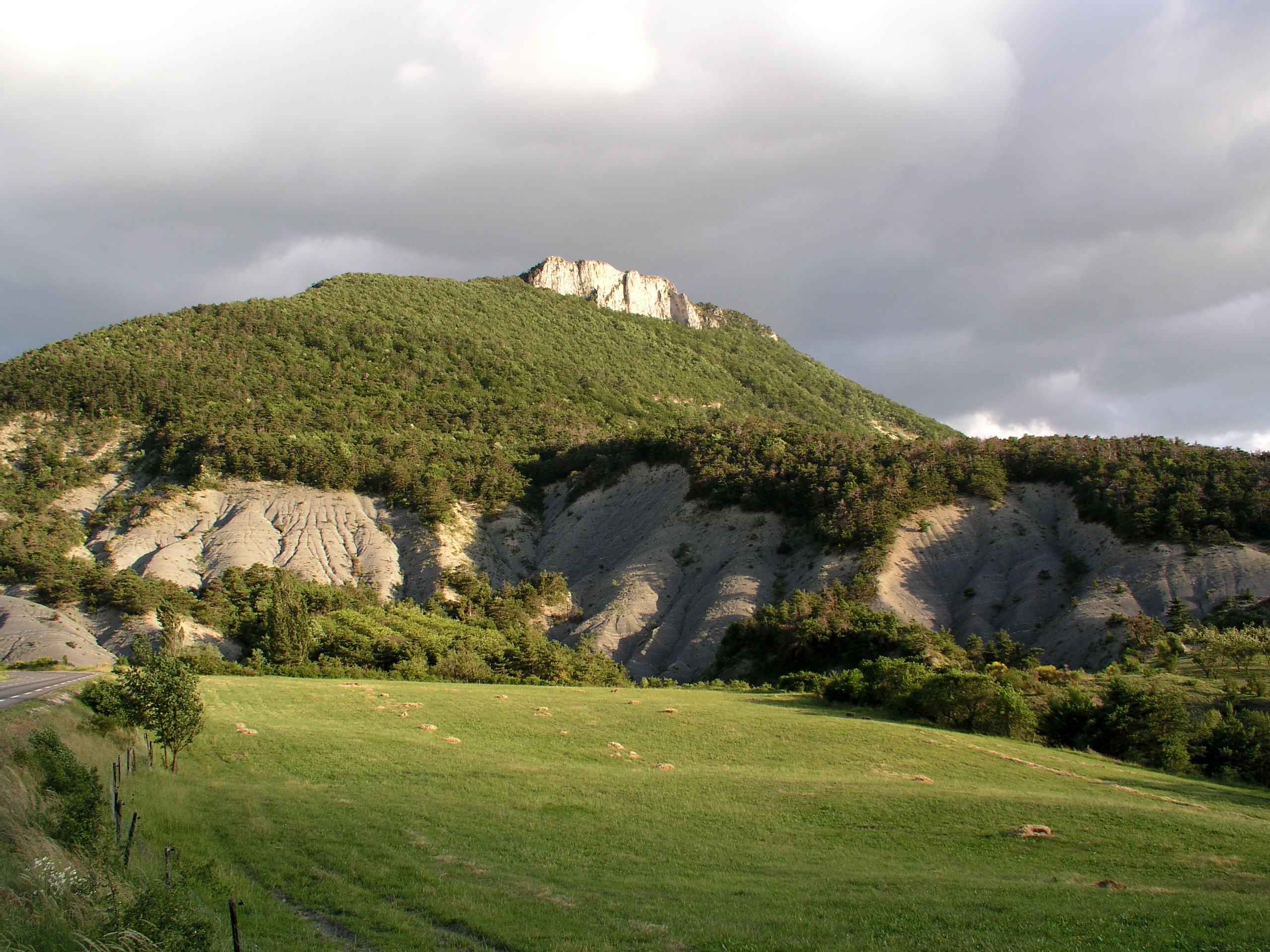
- Location of Moydans
- Location within France Location within Provence-Alpes-Côte d'Azur
- Coordinates: 44°24′02″N 5°30′16″E
- Country: France
- Region: Provence-Alpes-Côte d'Azur
- Department: Hautes-Alpes
- Arrondissement: Gap
- Canton: Serres

Government
  - Mayor (2026–32): Marie-José Dufour
- Area^{1}: 10.51 km^{2} (4.06 sq mi)
- Elevation: 752 m (2,467 ft)
- Highest elevation: 1,494 m (4,902 ft)
- Lowest elevation: 633 m (2,077 ft)
- Population (2023): 38
  - Density: 3.6/km^{2} (9.4/sq mi)
- Time zone: UTC+01:00 (CET)
  - Summer (DST): UTC+02:00 (CEST)
- INSEE/Postal code: 05091 /05150
- ^{1} French Land Register data, which excludes lakes, ponds, glaciers > 1 km^{2} (0.386 sq mi or 247 acres) and river estuaries.

Moydans is a commune in the Hautes-Alpes department in southeastern France.

== Population ==
Historical population
Year	Pop.	±% p.a.
1968	70	—
1975	75	+0.99%
1982	63	−2.46%
1990	58	−1.03%
1999	53	−1.00%
2007	48	−1.23%
2012	61	+4.91%
2017	44	−6.32%
2023	38	−2.41%
Source: INSEE

== See also ==
- Communes of the Hautes-Alpes department
