= Sorbiers, Hautes-Alpes =

Sorbiers
- Commune
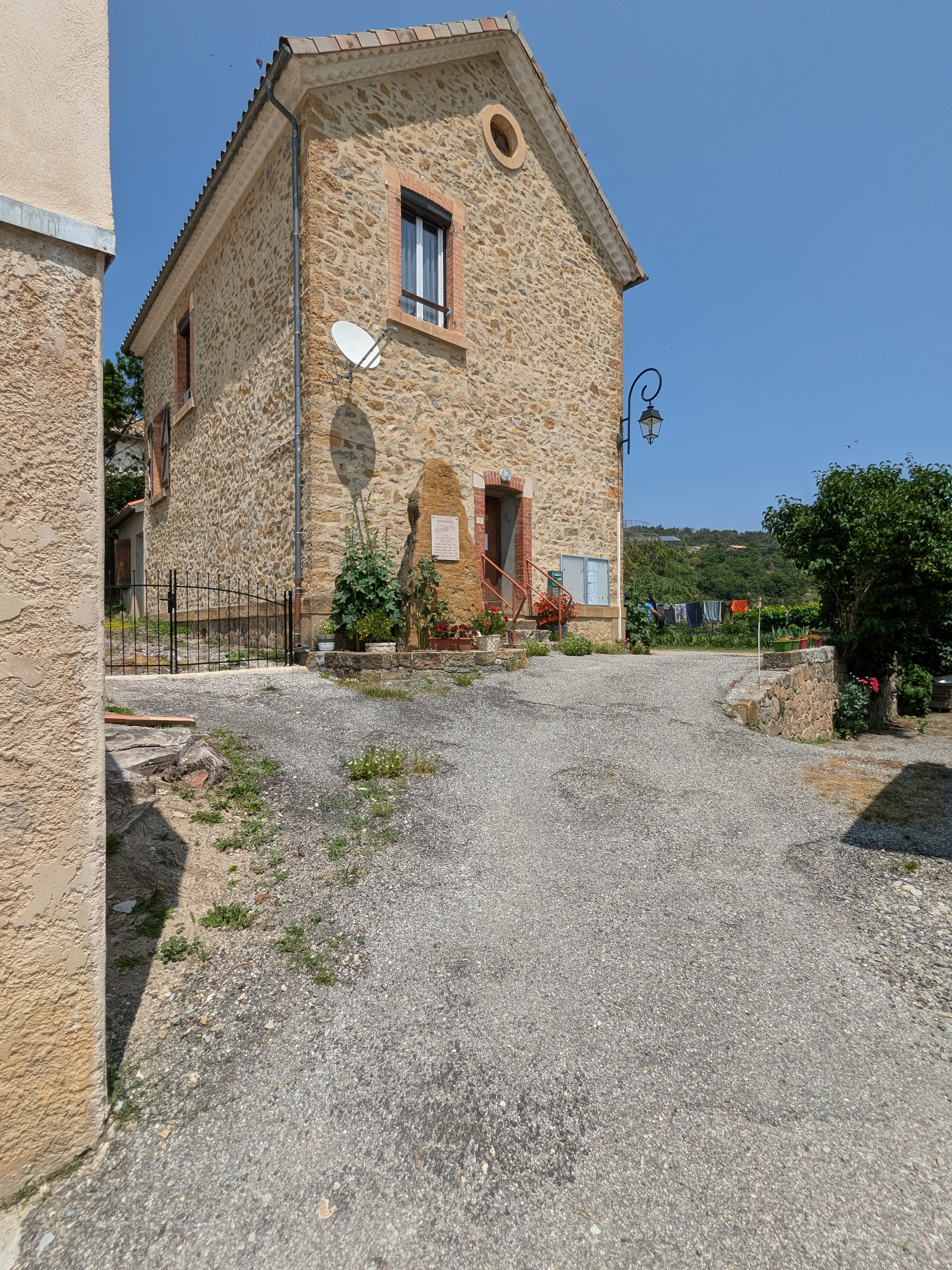
- Sorbiers (Hautes-Alpes) Town hall
- Location of Sorbiers
- Location within France Location within Provence-Alpes-Côte d'Azur
- Coordinates: 44°22′32″N 5°33′50″E
- Country: France
- Region: Provence-Alpes-Côte d'Azur
- Department: Hautes-Alpes
- Arrondissement: Gap
- Canton: Serres

Government
  - Mayor (2026–32): Yves Rabasse
- Area^{1}: 13.93 km^{2} (5.38 sq mi)
- Elevation: 800 m (2,600 ft)
- Highest elevation: 1,177 m (3,862 ft)
- Lowest elevation: 700 m (2,300 ft)
- Population (2023): 50
  - Density: 3.6/km^{2} (9.3/sq mi)
- Time zone: UTC+01:00 (CET)
  - Summer (DST): UTC+02:00 (CEST)
- INSEE/Postal code: 05169 /05150
- ^{1} French Land Register data, which excludes lakes, ponds, glaciers > 1 km^{2} (0.386 sq mi or 247 acres) and river estuaries.

Sorbiers (French pronunciation: [sɔʁbje]; Occitan: Arbres de rowan) is a commune in the Hautes-Alpes department in southeastern France.

== Population ==
Historical population
Year	Pop.	±% p.a.
1968	19	—
1975	20	+0.74%
1982	28	+4.92%
1990	36	+3.19%
1999	54	+4.61%
2007	37	−4.62%
2012	42	+2.57%
2017	36	−3.04%
2023	50	+5.63%
Source: INSEE

== See also ==
- Communes of the Hautes-Alpes department
