= Trescléoux =

- Commune
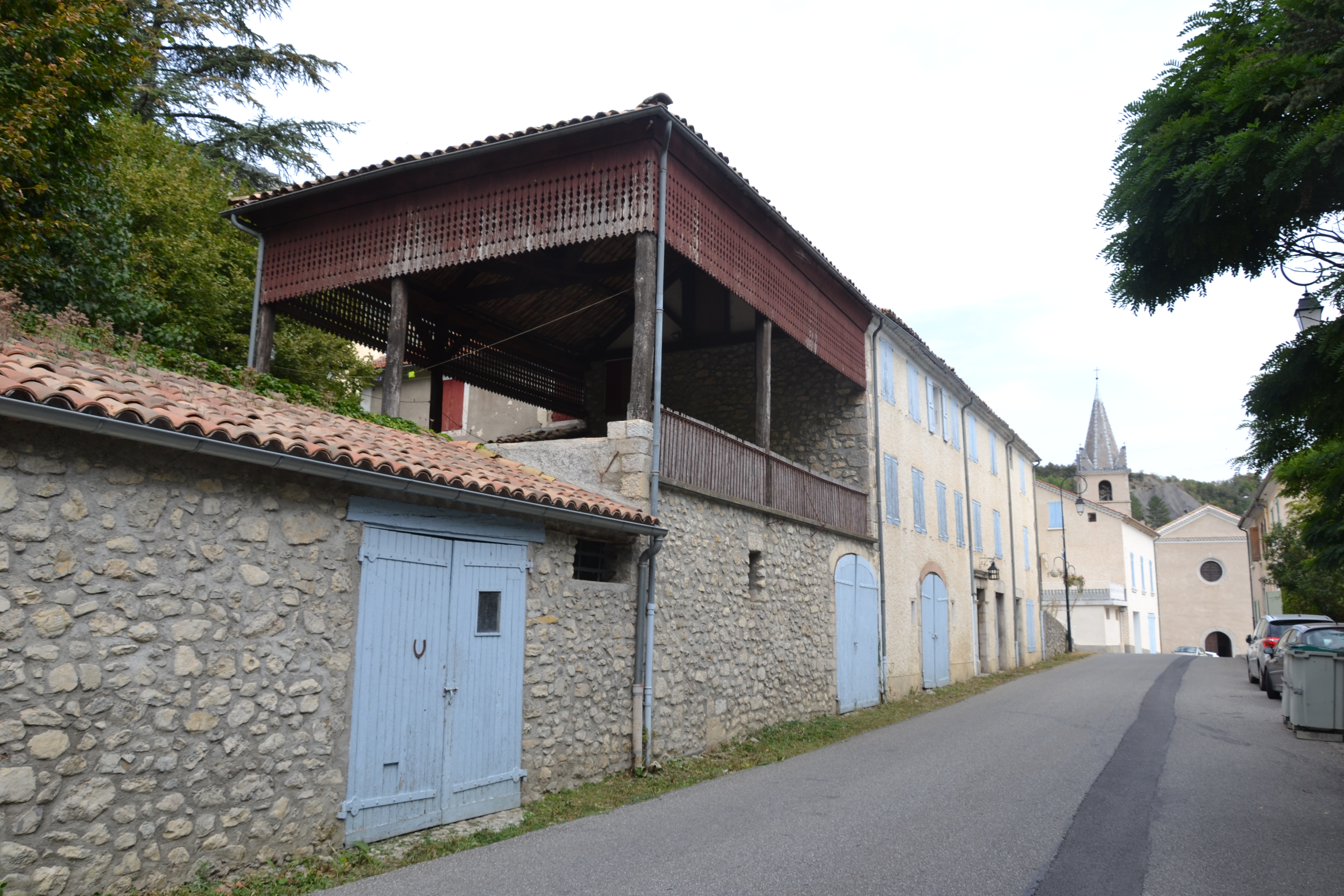

- Coat of arms
- Location of Trescléoux
- Location within France Location within Provence-Alpes-Côte d'Azur
- Coordinates: 44°21′17″N 5°42′33″E
- Country: France
- Region: Provence-Alpes-Côte d'Azur
- Department: Hautes-Alpes
- Arrondissement: Gap
- Canton: Serres

Government
  - Mayor (2026–32): Jean Schüler
- Area^{1}: 18.68 km^{2} (7.21 sq mi)
- Elevation: 665 m (2,182 ft)
- Highest elevation: 1,375 m (4,511 ft)
- Lowest elevation: 584 m (1,916 ft)
- Population (2023): 296
  - Density: 15.8/km^{2} (41.0/sq mi)
- Time zone: UTC+01:00 (CET)
  - Summer (DST): UTC+02:00 (CEST)
- INSEE/Postal code: 05172 /05700
- ^{1} French Land Register data, which excludes lakes, ponds, glaciers > 1 km^{2} (0.386 sq mi or 247 acres) and river estuaries.

Trescléoux (French pronunciation: [tʁɛskleu]; Occitan: Trescleus) is a commune in the Hautes-Alpes department in southeastern France.

== Population ==
Historical population
Year	Pop.	±% p.a.
1968	239	—
1975	225	−0.86%
1982	244	+1.16%
1990	263	+0.94%
1999	275	+0.50%
2007	315	+1.71%
2012	307	−0.51%
2017	317	+0.64%
2023	296	−1.14%
Source: INSEE

== See also ==
- Communes of the Hautes-Alpes department
