= Montclus, Hautes-Alpes =

Montclus
- Commune
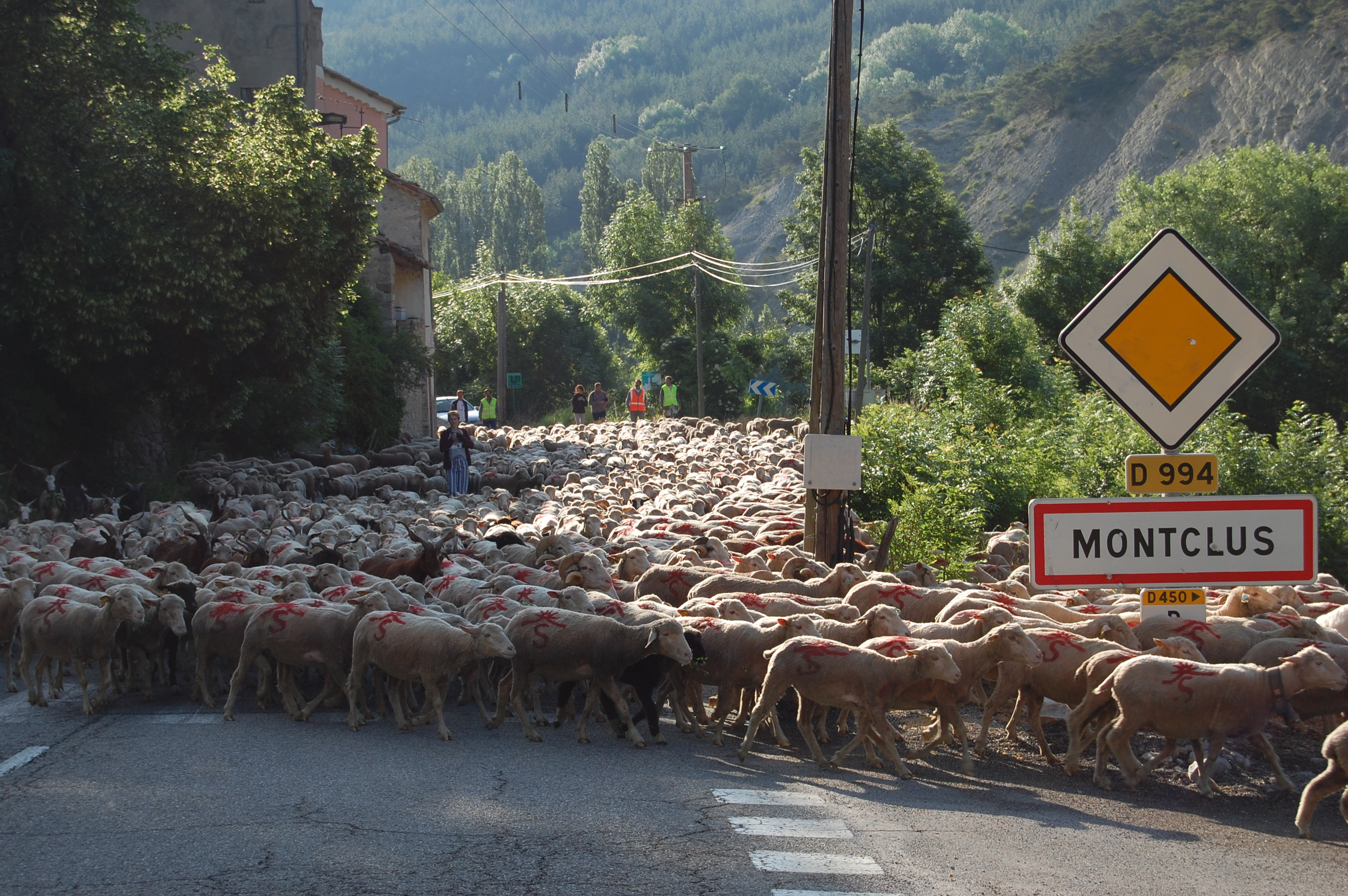
- A flock of sheep being herded on the D994 road, at the entrance to Montclus

- Coat of arms
- Location of Montclus
- Location within France Location within Provence-Alpes-Côte d'Azur
- Coordinates: 44°24′57″N 5°41′00″E
- Country: France
- Region: Provence-Alpes-Côte d'Azur
- Department: Hautes-Alpes
- Arrondissement: Gap
- Canton: Serres

Government
  - Mayor (2026–32): Catherine Desreumaux
- Area^{1}: 21.25 km^{2} (8.20 sq mi)
- Elevation: 719 m (2,359 ft)
- Highest elevation: 1,546 m (5,072 ft)
- Lowest elevation: 680 m (2,230 ft)
- Population (2023): 54
  - Density: 2.5/km^{2} (6.6/sq mi)
- Time zone: UTC+01:00 (CET)
  - Summer (DST): UTC+02:00 (CEST)
- INSEE/Postal code: 05081 /05700
- ^{1} French Land Register data, which excludes lakes, ponds, glaciers > 1 km^{2} (0.386 sq mi or 247 acres) and river estuaries.

Montclus is a commune in the Hautes-Alpes department in southeastern France.

== Population ==
Historical population
| Year | Pop. | ±% p.a. |
|---|---|---|
| 1968 | 47 | — |
| 1975 | 40 | −2.28% |
| 1982 | 46 | +2.02% |
| 1990 | 45 | −0.27% |
| 1999 | 48 | +0.72% |
| 2007 | 46 | −0.53% |
| 2012 | 57 | +4.38% |
| 2017 | 57 | +0.00% |
| 2023 | 54 | −0.90% |
Source: INSEE

== See also ==
- Communes of the Hautes-Alpes department
