= Étoile-Saint-Cyrice =

- Commune
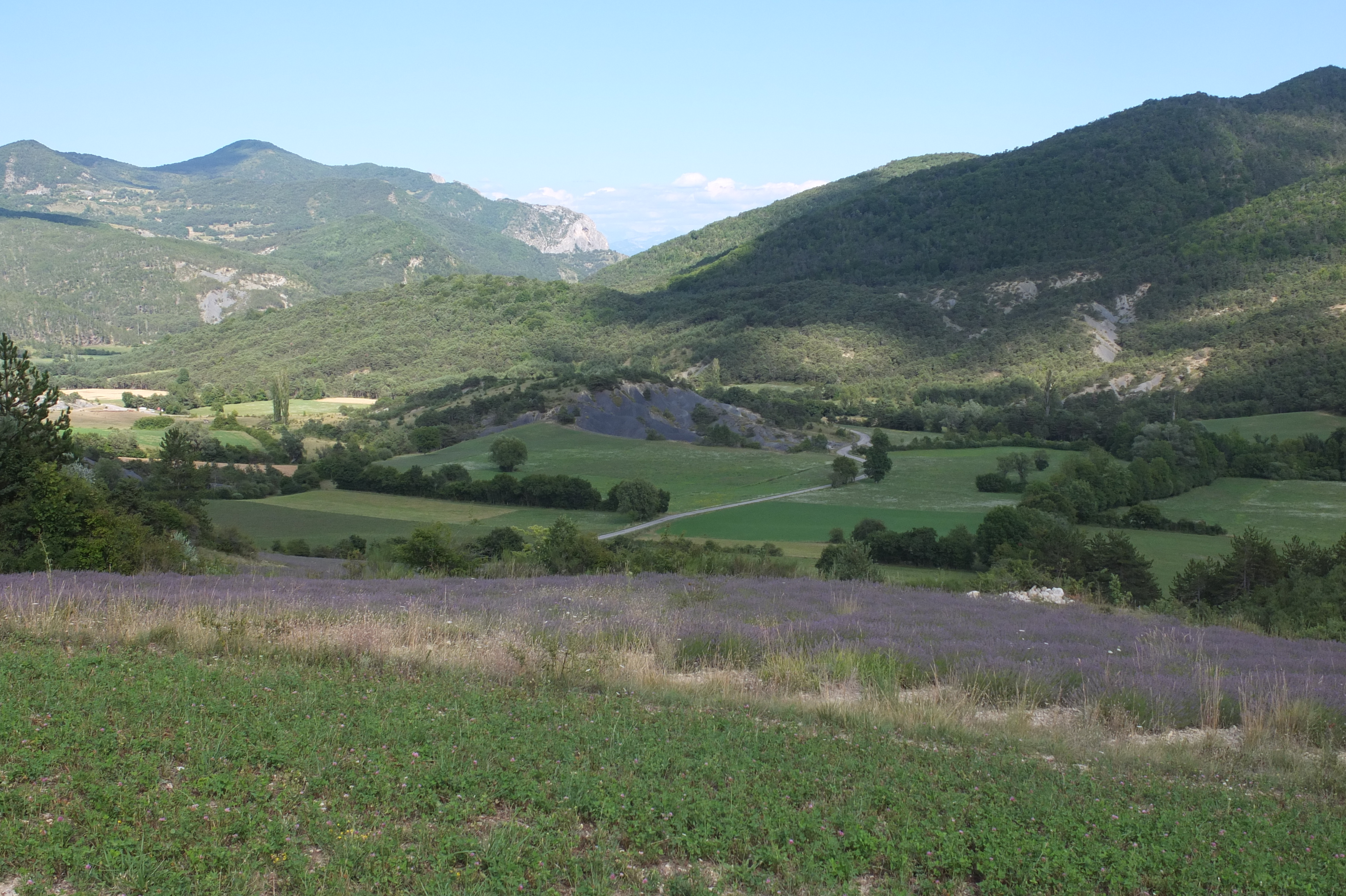
- The valley of Étoile-Saint-Cyrice
- Location of Étoile-Saint-Cyrice
- Location within France Location within Provence-Alpes-Côte d'Azur
- Coordinates: 44°18′58″N 5°37′43″E
- Country: France
- Region: Provence-Alpes-Côte d'Azur
- Department: Hautes-Alpes
- Arrondissement: Gap
- Canton: Serres
- Intercommunality: Sisteronais-Buëch

Government
  - Mayor (2026–32): Sylvaine Jouve
- Area^{1}: 14.41 km^{2} (5.56 sq mi)
- Elevation: 880 m (2,890 ft)
- Highest elevation: 1,296 m (4,252 ft)
- Lowest elevation: 698 m (2,290 ft)
- Population (2023): 23
  - Density: 1.6/km^{2} (4.1/sq mi)
- Time zone: UTC+01:00 (CET)
  - Summer (DST): UTC+02:00 (CEST)
- INSEE/Postal code: 05051 /05700
- ^{1} French Land Register data, which excludes lakes, ponds, glaciers > 1 km^{2} (0.386 sq mi or 247 acres) and river estuaries.

Étoile-Saint-Cyrice (French pronunciation: [etwal sɛ̃ siʁis]; Occitan: Estela Sant Cirici) is a commune in the Hautes-Alpes department in southeastern France.

== Geography ==
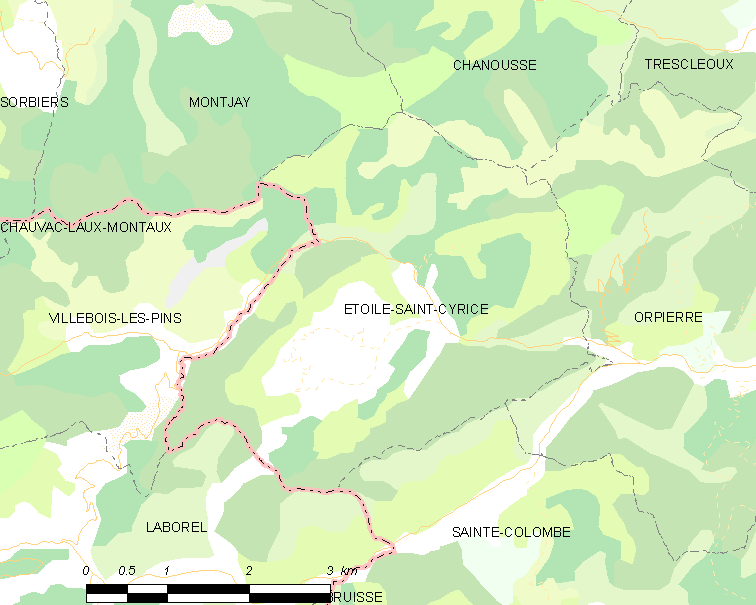

== Population ==
Historical population
Year	Pop.	±% p.a.
1968	39	—
1975	29	−4.14%
1982	20	−5.17%
1990	28	+4.30%
1999	31	+1.14%
2007	35	+1.53%
2012	32	−1.78%
2017	30	−1.28%
2023	23	−4.33%
Source: INSEE

== See also ==
- Communes of the Hautes-Alpes department
