= La Haute-Beaume =

- Commune
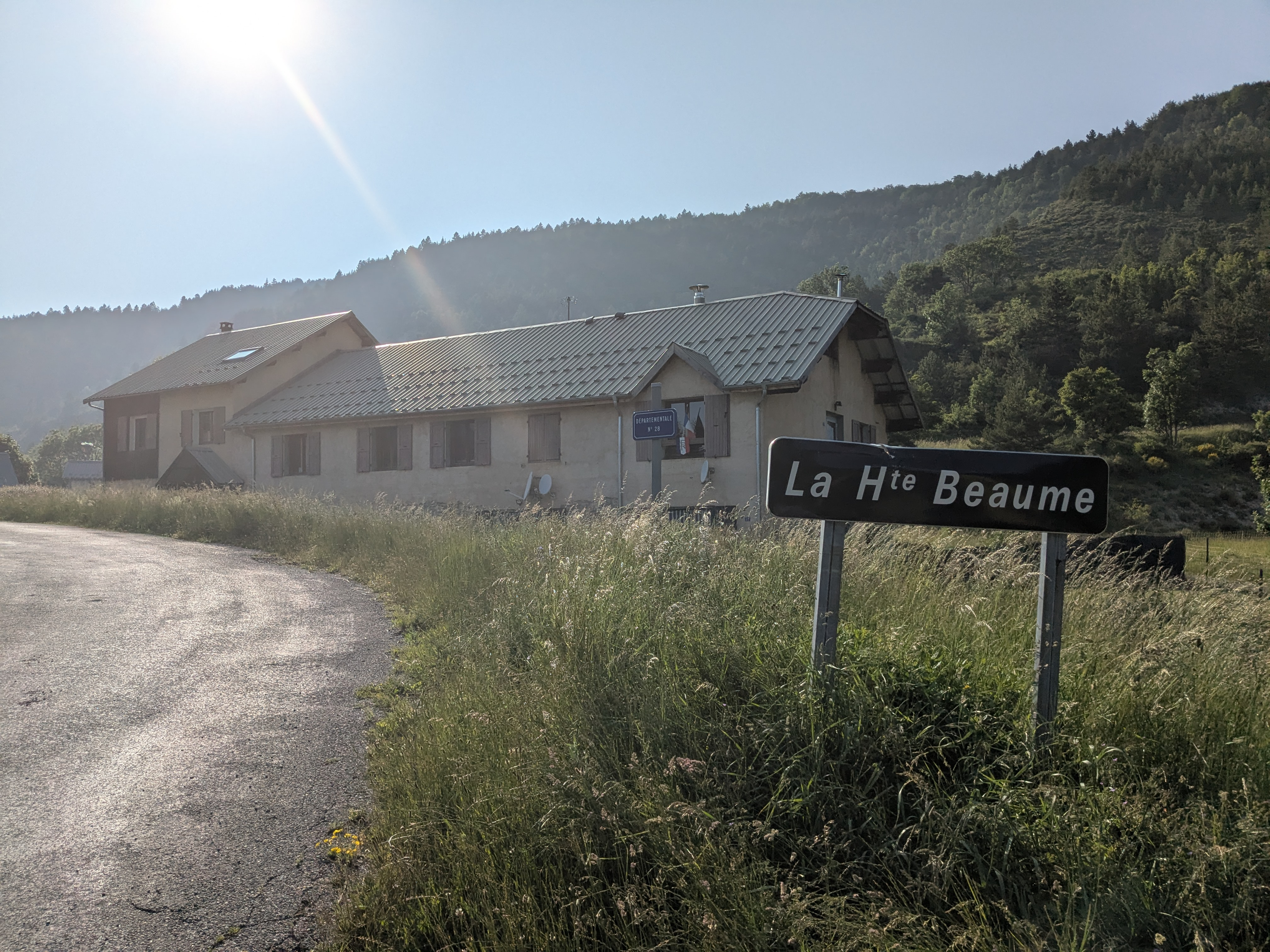
- La Haute-Beaume Town hall
- Location of La Haute-Beaume
- Location within France Location within Provence-Alpes-Côte d'Azur
- Coordinates: 44°33′52″N 5°37′43″E
- Country: France
- Region: Provence-Alpes-Côte d'Azur
- Department: Hautes-Alpes
- Arrondissement: Gap
- Canton: Serres
- Intercommunality: Buëch Dévoluy

Government
  - Mayor (2026–32): Jean-Philippe Salley
- Area^{1}: 7.13 km^{2} (2.75 sq mi)
- Elevation: 1,100 m (3,600 ft)
- Highest elevation: 1,690 m (5,540 ft)
- Lowest elevation: 993 m (3,258 ft)
- Population (2023): 7
  - Density: 0.98/km^{2} (2.5/sq mi)
- Time zone: UTC+01:00 (CET)
  - Summer (DST): UTC+02:00 (CEST)
- INSEE/Postal code: 05066 /05140
- ^{1} French Land Register data, which excludes lakes, ponds, glaciers > 1 km^{2} (0.386 sq mi or 247 acres) and river estuaries.

La Haute-Beaume (French pronunciation: [la ot bom]; Occitan: La Bauma Auta) is a commune in the Hautes-Alpes department in southeastern France.

== Population ==
Historical population
Year	Pop.	±% p.a.
1968	6	—
1975	14	+12.87%
1982	10	−4.69%
1990	10	+0.00%
1999	10	+0.00%
2007	9	−1.31%
2012	10	+2.13%
2017	9	−2.09%
2023	7	−4.10%
Source: INSEE

== See also ==
- Communes of the Hautes-Alpes department
