= Nossage-et-Bénévent =

- Commune
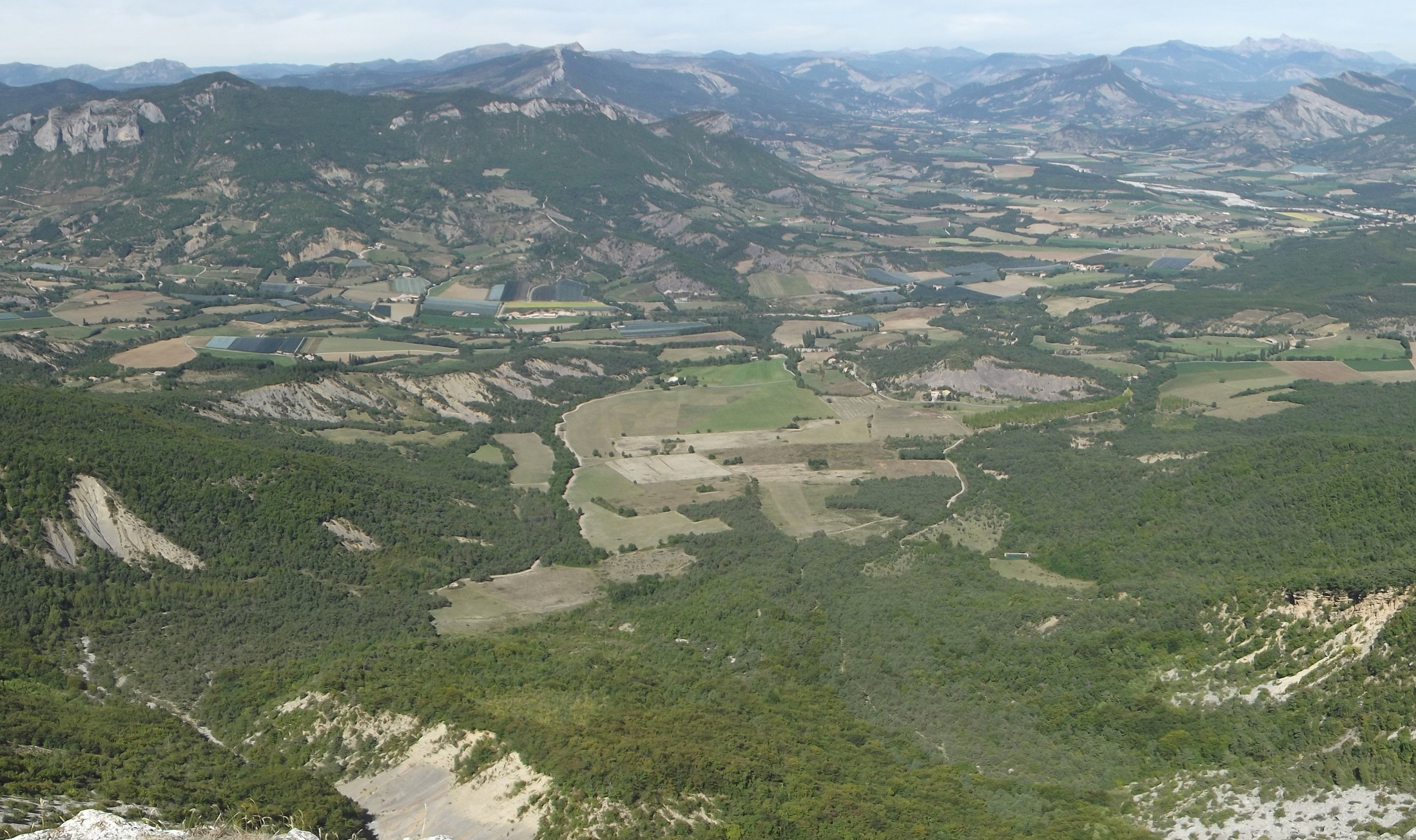
- An aerial view of Nossage-et-Bénévent
- Location of Nossage-et-Bénévent
- Location within France Location within Provence-Alpes-Côte d'Azur
- Coordinates: 44°18′58″N 5°44′57″E
- Country: France
- Region: Provence-Alpes-Côte d'Azur
- Department: Hautes-Alpes
- Arrondissement: Gap
- Canton: Serres
- Intercommunality: Sisteronais-Buëch

Government
  - Mayor (2026–32): Martial Espitallier
- Area^{1}: 4.31 km^{2} (1.66 sq mi)
- Elevation: 690 m (2,260 ft)
- Highest elevation: 1,352 m (4,436 ft)
- Lowest elevation: 610 m (2,000 ft)
- Population (2023): 10
  - Density: 2.3/km^{2} (6.0/sq mi)
- Time zone: UTC+01:00 (CET)
  - Summer (DST): UTC+02:00 (CEST)
- INSEE/Postal code: 05094 /05700
- ^{1} French Land Register data, which excludes lakes, ponds, glaciers > 1 km^{2} (0.386 sq mi or 247 acres) and river estuaries.

Nossage-et-Bénévent (French pronunciation: [nɔsaʒ e benevɑ̃]; Occitan: Nossatge e Benevent) is a commune in the Hautes-Alpes department in southeastern France.

== Population ==
Historical population
Year	Pop.	±% p.a.
1968	17	—
1975	14	−2.74%
1982	8	−7.68%
1990	10	+2.83%
1999	8	−2.45%
2007	12	+5.20%
2012	11	−1.73%
2017	15	+6.40%
2023	10	−6.53%
Source: INSEE

== See also ==
- Communes of the Hautes-Alpes department
