= Orpierre =

- Commune
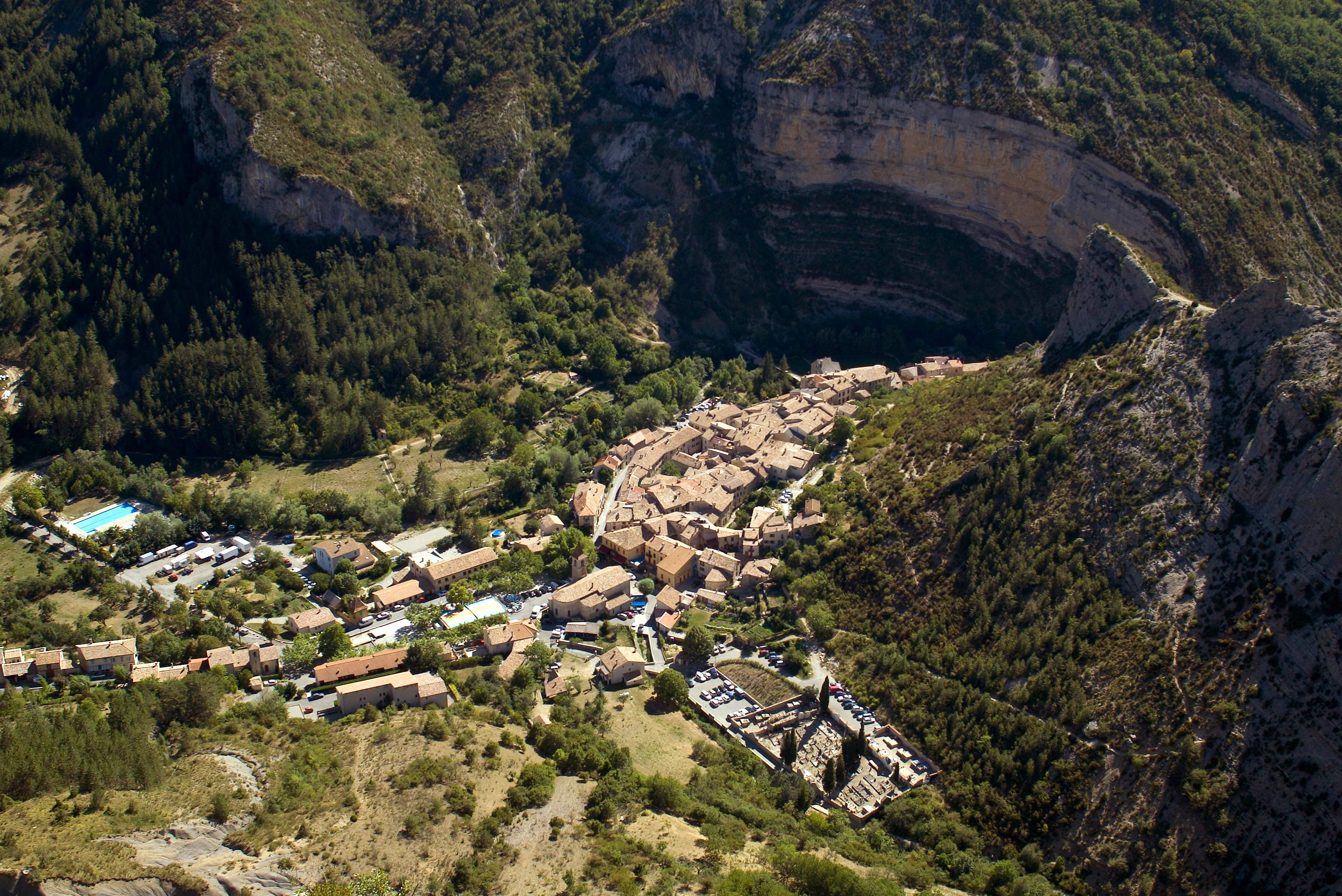
- An aerial view of the village in Orpierre. The RN75 road leads in from the left, from Eyguians.

- Coat of arms
- Location of Orpierre
- Location within France Location within Provence-Alpes-Côte d'Azur
- Coordinates: 44°18′50″N 5°41′30″E
- Country: France
- Region: Provence-Alpes-Côte d'Azur
- Department: Hautes-Alpes
- Arrondissement: Gap
- Canton: Serres

Government
  - Mayor (2026–32): Gilles Cremillieux
- Area^{1}: 27.57 km^{2} (10.64 sq mi)
- Elevation: 698 m (2,290 ft)
- Highest elevation: 1,323 m (4,341 ft)
- Lowest elevation: 619 m (2,031 ft)
- Population (2023): 316
  - Density: 11.5/km^{2} (29.7/sq mi)
- Time zone: UTC+01:00 (CET)
  - Summer (DST): UTC+02:00 (CEST)
- INSEE/Postal code: 05097 /05700
- ^{1} French Land Register data, which excludes lakes, ponds, glaciers > 1 km^{2} (0.386 sq mi or 247 acres) and river estuaries.

Orpierre (French pronunciation: [ɔʁpjɛʁ]; Occitan: Aurpèira) is a commune in the Hautes-Alpes department in southeastern France. The village has multiple sites for rock climbing nearby; one is directly to the north of the village.

== Population ==
Historical population
Year	Pop.	±% p.a.
1968	258	—
1975	257	−0.06%
1982	275	+0.97%
1990	335	+2.50%
1999	256	−2.94%
2007	323	+2.95%
2012	327	+0.25%
2017	352	+1.48%
2023	316	−1.78%
Source: INSEE

== See also ==
- Communes of the Hautes-Alpes department
