= Chanousse =

- Commune
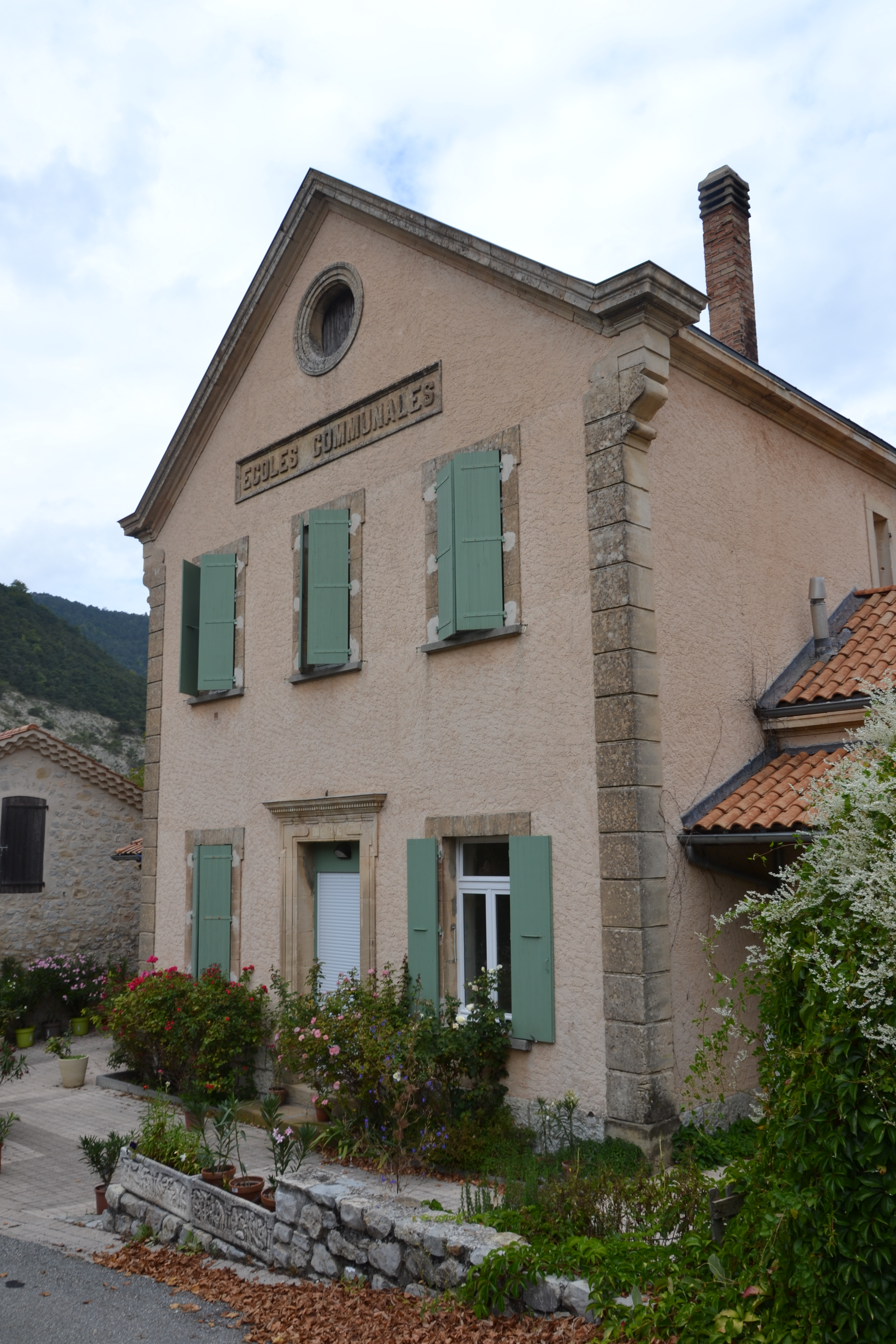
- Location of Chanousse
- Location within France Location within Provence-Alpes-Côte d'Azur
- Coordinates: 44°21′21″N 5°39′23″E
- Country: France
- Region: Provence-Alpes-Côte d'Azur
- Department: Hautes-Alpes
- Arrondissement: Gap
- Canton: Serres

Government
  - Mayor (2026–32): Alain Mathieu
- Area^{1}: 20.32 km^{2} (7.85 sq mi)
- Elevation: 730 m (2,400 ft)
- Highest elevation: 1,520 m (4,990 ft)
- Lowest elevation: 695 m (2,280 ft)
- Population (2023): 39
  - Density: 1.9/km^{2} (5.0/sq mi)
- Time zone: UTC+01:00 (CET)
  - Summer (DST): UTC+02:00 (CEST)
- INSEE/Postal code: 05033 /05700
- ^{1} French Land Register data, which excludes lakes, ponds, glaciers > 1 km^{2} (0.386 sq mi or 247 acres) and river estuaries.

Chanousse (French pronunciation: [ʃanus]) is a commune in the Hautes-Alpes department in southeastern France.

== Population ==
Historical population
| Year | Pop. | ±% p.a. |
|---|---|---|
| 1968 | 30 | — |
| 1975 | 22 | −4.33% |
| 1982 | 29 | +4.03% |
| 1990 | 30 | +0.42% |
| 1999 | 34 | +1.40% |
| 2007 | 44 | +3.28% |
| 2012 | 61 | +6.75% |
| 2017 | 39 | −8.56% |
| 2023 | 39 | +0.00% |
Source: INSEE

== See also ==
- Communes of the Hautes-Alpes department
