= Montrond, Hautes-Alpes =

Montrond
- Commune
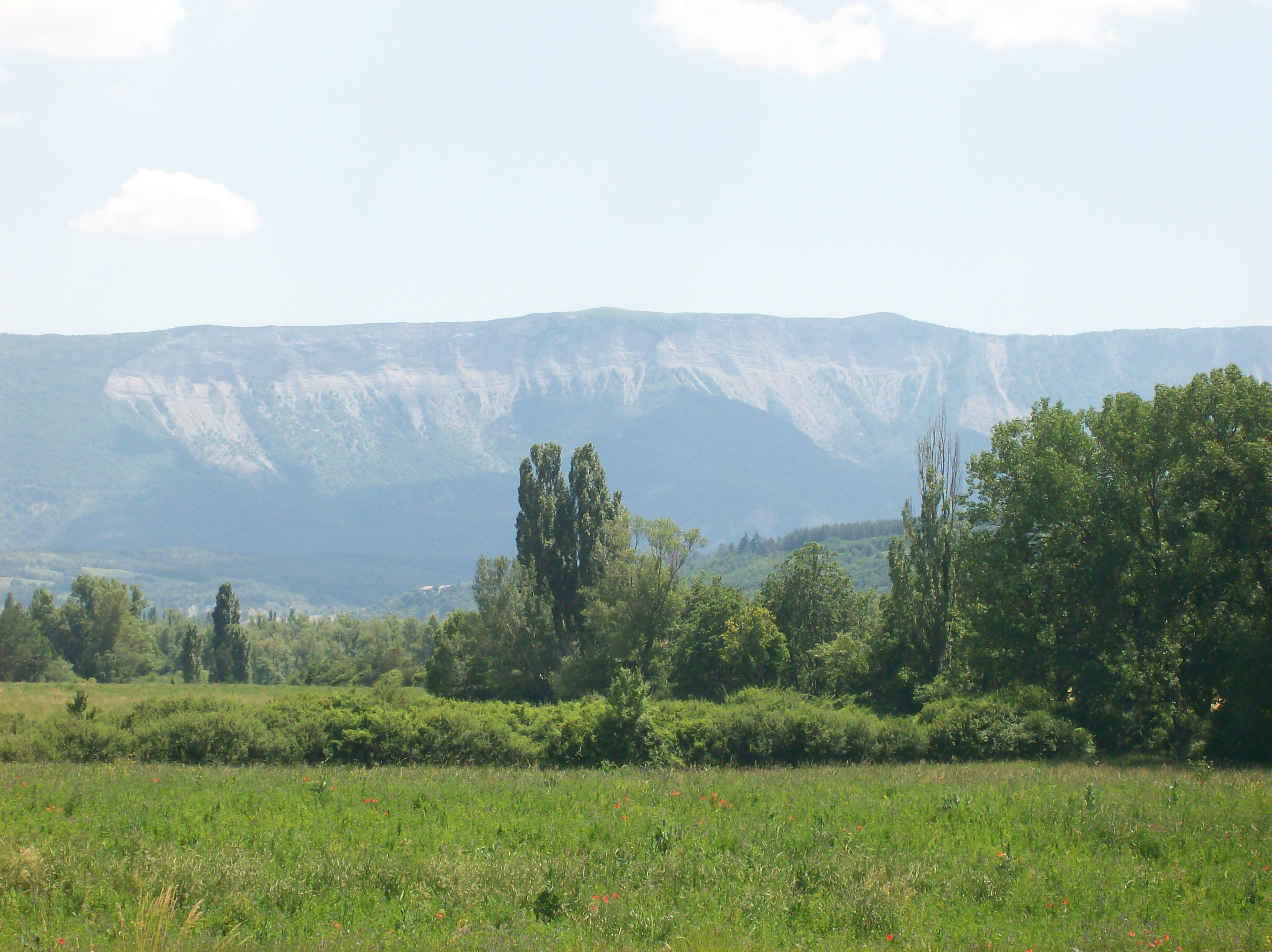
- The Montagne de Chabre, seen from the RN75 road, in the area of Montrond

- Coat of arms
- Location of Montrond
- Location within France Location within Provence-Alpes-Côte d'Azur
- Coordinates: 44°22′57″N 5°44′29″E
- Country: France
- Region: Provence-Alpes-Côte d'Azur
- Department: Hautes-Alpes
- Arrondissement: Gap
- Canton: Serres

Government
  - Mayor (2026–32): Alain Roumieu
- Area^{1}: 4.46 km^{2} (1.72 sq mi)
- Elevation: 625 m (2,051 ft)
- Highest elevation: 822 m (2,697 ft)
- Lowest elevation: 605 m (1,985 ft)
- Population (2023): 90
  - Density: 20/km^{2} (52/sq mi)
- Time zone: UTC+01:00 (CET)
  - Summer (DST): UTC+02:00 (CEST)
- INSEE/Postal code: 05089 /05700
- ^{1} French Land Register data, which excludes lakes, ponds, glaciers > 1 km^{2} (0.386 sq mi or 247 acres) and river estuaries.

Montrond is a commune in the Hautes-Alpes department in southeastern France.

== Population ==
Historical population
| Year | Pop. | ±% p.a. |
|---|---|---|
| 1968 | 49 | — |
| 1975 | 52 | +0.85% |
| 1982 | 47 | −1.43% |
| 1990 | 53 | +1.51% |
| 1999 | 39 | −3.35% |
| 2007 | 49 | +2.89% |
| 2012 | 61 | +4.48% |
| 2017 | 74 | +3.94% |
| 2023 | 90 | +3.32% |
Source: INSEE

== See also ==
- Communes of the Hautes-Alpes department
