= Oze, Hautes-Alpes =

Oze
- Commune
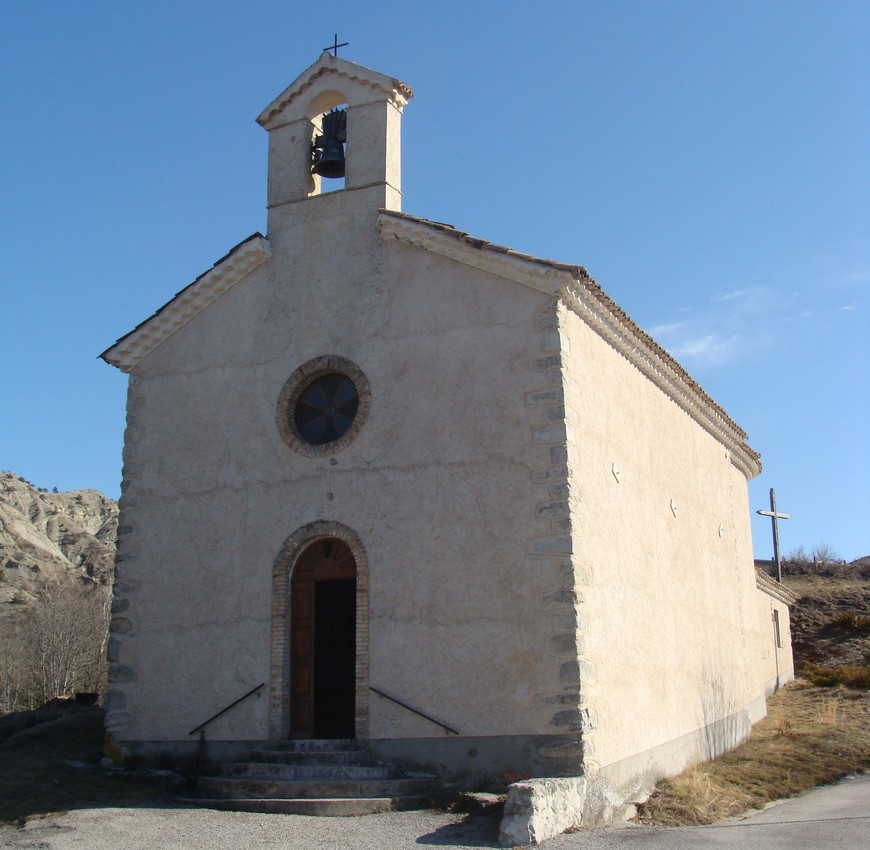
- The church in Oze
- Location of Oze
- Location within France Location within Provence-Alpes-Côte d'Azur
- Coordinates: 44°30′21″N 5°48′21″E
- Country: France
- Region: Provence-Alpes-Côte d'Azur
- Department: Hautes-Alpes
- Arrondissement: Gap
- Canton: Serres

Government
  - Mayor (2026–32): Marion Alfinito
- Area^{1}: 12.03 km^{2} (4.64 sq mi)
- Elevation: 850 m (2,790 ft)
- Highest elevation: 1,603 m (5,259 ft)
- Lowest elevation: 737 m (2,418 ft)
- Population (2023): 103
  - Density: 8.56/km^{2} (22.2/sq mi)
- Time zone: UTC+01:00 (CET)
  - Summer (DST): UTC+02:00 (CEST)
- INSEE/Postal code: 05099 /05400
- ^{1} French Land Register data, which excludes lakes, ponds, glaciers > 1 km^{2} (0.386 sq mi or 247 acres) and river estuaries.

Oze (French pronunciation: [oz]; Occitan: Auza) is a commune in the Hautes-Alpes department in southeastern France.

== Population ==
Historical population
| Year | Pop. | ±% p.a. |
|---|---|---|
| 1968 | 60 | — |
| 1975 | 54 | −1.49% |
| 1982 | 67 | +3.13% |
| 1990 | 58 | −1.79% |
| 1999 | 65 | +1.27% |
| 2007 | 90 | +4.15% |
| 2012 | 100 | +2.13% |
| 2017 | 106 | +1.17% |
| 2023 | 103 | −0.48% |
Source: INSEE

== See also ==
- Communes of the Hautes-Alpes department

=== External links ===
- Site de la mairie
