= La Faurie =

- Commune
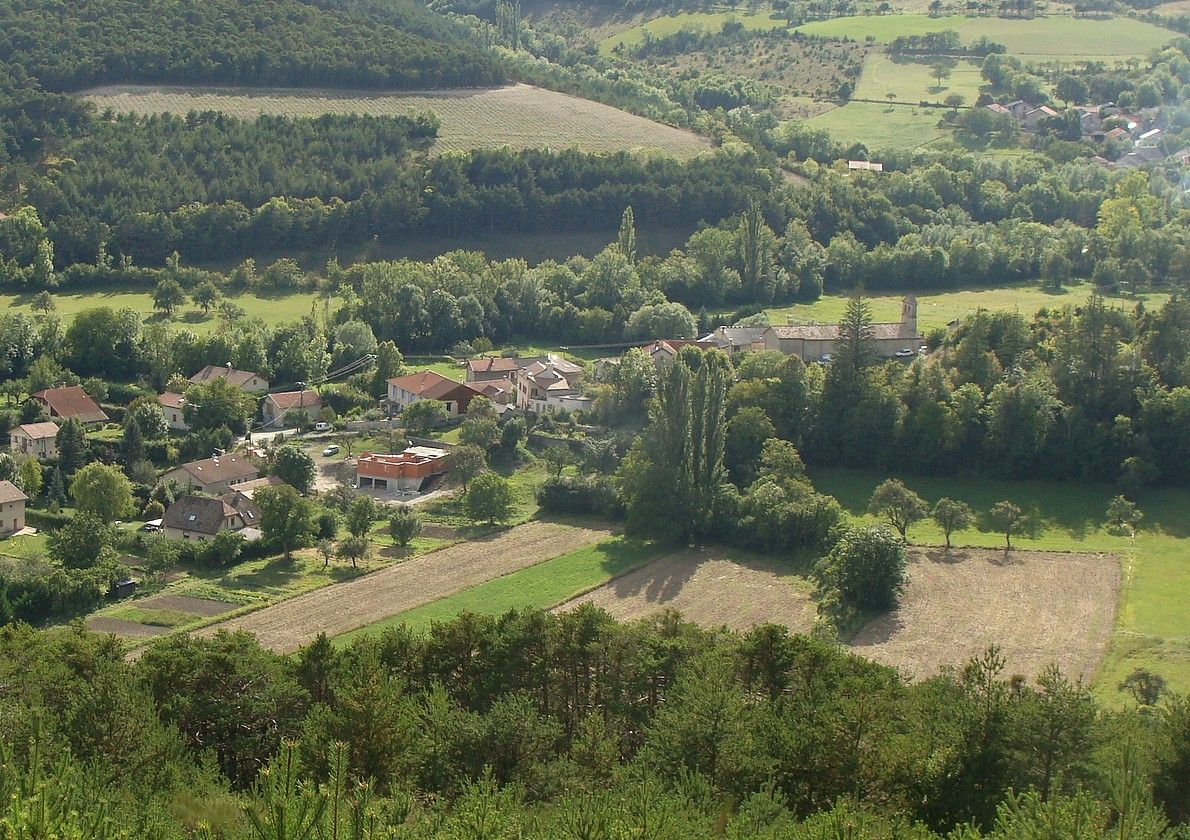

- Coat of arms
- Location of La Faurie
- Location within France Location within Provence-Alpes-Côte d'Azur
- Coordinates: 44°34′05″N 5°44′26″E
- Country: France
- Region: Provence-Alpes-Côte d'Azur
- Department: Hautes-Alpes
- Arrondissement: Gap
- Canton: Serres

Government
  - Mayor (2026–32): Thomas Eymery
- Area^{1}: 31.44 km^{2} (12.14 sq mi)
- Elevation: 876 m (2,874 ft)
- Highest elevation: 2,063 m (6,768 ft)
- Lowest elevation: 780 m (2,560 ft)
- Population (2023): 287
  - Density: 9.13/km^{2} (23.6/sq mi)
- Time zone: UTC+01:00 (CET)
  - Summer (DST): UTC+02:00 (CEST)
- INSEE/Postal code: 05055 /05140
- ^{1} French Land Register data, which excludes lakes, ponds, glaciers > 1 km^{2} (0.386 sq mi or 247 acres) and river estuaries.

La Faurie (French pronunciation: [la foʁi]; Occitan: La Fauria) is a commune in the Hautes-Alpes department in southeastern France.

== Geography ==
=== Climate ===
La Faurie has a warm-summer mediterranean climate (Köppen climate classification Csb). The average annual temperature in La Faurie is 9.3 °C (48.7 °F). The average annual rainfall is 937.6 mm (36.91 in) with October as the wettest month. The temperatures are highest on average in July, at around 18.4 °C (65.1 °F), and lowest in January, at around 0.4 °C (32.7 °F). The highest temperature ever recorded in La Faurie was 37.5 °C (99.5 °F) on 26 June 2019; the coldest temperature ever recorded was −21.4 °C (−6.5 °F) on 14 February 1999.

Climate data for La Faurie (1981–2010 averages, extremes 1997−present)
Month	Jan	Feb	Mar	Apr	May	Jun	Jul	Aug	Sep	Oct	Nov	Dec	Year
Record high °C (°F)	20.3 (68.5)	22.4 (72.3)	23.4 (74.1)	28.2 (82.8)	30.8 (87.4)	37.5 (99.5)	36.2 (97.2)	36.6 (97.9)	34.3 (93.7)	26.7 (80.1)	23.1 (73.6)	16.8 (62.2)	37.5 (99.5)
Mean daily maximum °C (°F)	6.4 (43.5)	8.1 (46.6)	11.7 (53.1)	14.9 (58.8)	20.0 (68.0)	24.6 (76.3)	27.2 (81.0)	26.8 (80.2)	21.9 (71.4)	17.1 (62.8)	10.0 (50.0)	6.3 (43.3)	16.3 (61.3)
Daily mean °C (°F)	0.4 (32.7)	1.7 (35.1)	5.1 (41.2)	8.1 (46.6)	12.6 (54.7)	16.3 (61.3)	18.4 (65.1)	18.2 (64.8)	14.2 (57.6)	10.3 (50.5)	4.4 (39.9)	1.0 (33.8)	9.3 (48.7)
Mean daily minimum °C (°F)	−5.6 (21.9)	−4.7 (23.5)	−1.6 (29.1)	1.2 (34.2)	5.2 (41.4)	8.1 (46.6)	9.6 (49.3)	9.6 (49.3)	6.4 (43.5)	3.5 (38.3)	−1.2 (29.8)	−4.4 (24.1)	2.2 (36.0)
Record low °C (°F)	−19.4 (−2.9)	−21.4 (−6.5)	−14.0 (6.8)	−9.5 (14.9)	−3.9 (25.0)	−1.9 (28.6)	1.1 (34.0)	0.6 (33.1)	−2.5 (27.5)	−8.4 (16.9)	−15.4 (4.3)	−19.8 (−3.6)	−21.4 (−6.5)
Average precipitation mm (inches)	68.2 (2.69)	57.6 (2.27)	63.3 (2.49)	94.5 (3.72)	92.6 (3.65)	63.7 (2.51)	35.6 (1.40)	55.9 (2.20)	99.7 (3.93)	112.2 (4.42)	108.6 (4.28)	85.7 (3.37)	937.6 (36.91)
Average precipitation days (≥ 1.0 mm)	7.9	5.9	7.9	9.8	9.7	6.6	5.6	7.2	6.5	8.6	9.6	8.1	93.6
Source: Meteociel

== Population ==
Historical population
Year	Pop.	±% p.a.
1968	250	—
1975	227	−1.37%
1982	215	−0.77%
1990	224	+0.51%
1999	231	+0.34%
2007	314	+3.91%
2012	305	−0.58%
2017	325	+1.28%
2023	287	−2.05%
Source: INSEE

== See also ==
- Communes of the Hautes-Alpes department
