= Ribeyret =

- Commune
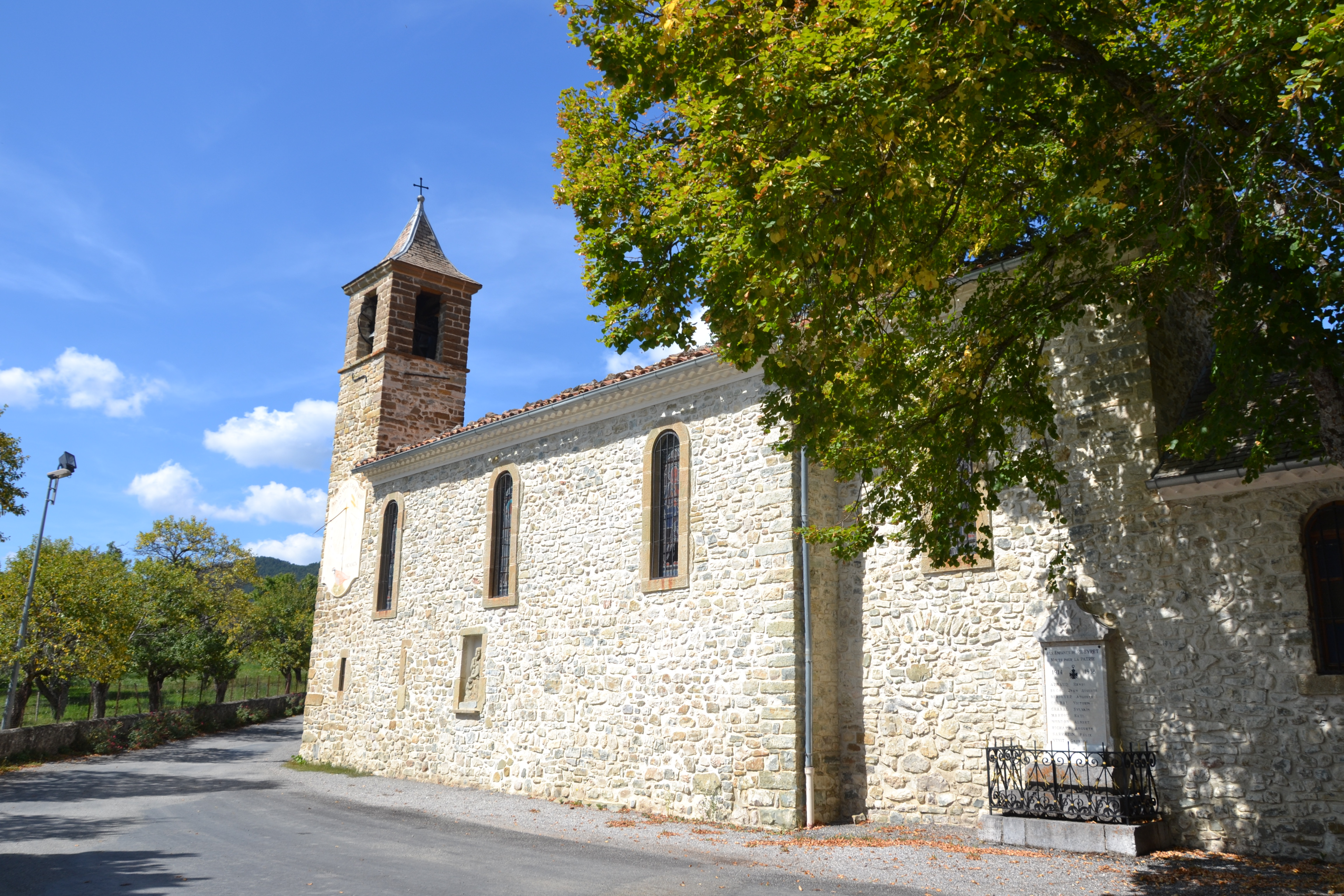
- Location of Ribeyret
- Location within France Location within Provence-Alpes-Côte d'Azur
- Coordinates: 44°24′51″N 5°33′19″E
- Country: France
- Region: Provence-Alpes-Côte d'Azur
- Department: Hautes-Alpes
- Arrondissement: Gap
- Canton: Serres

Government
  - Mayor (2026–32): André Gueyte
- Area^{1}: 17.87 km^{2} (6.90 sq mi)
- Elevation: 900 m (3,000 ft)
- Highest elevation: 1,564 m (5,131 ft)
- Lowest elevation: 720 m (2,360 ft)
- Population (2023): 106
  - Density: 5.93/km^{2} (15.4/sq mi)
- Time zone: UTC+01:00 (CET)
  - Summer (DST): UTC+02:00 (CEST)
- INSEE/Postal code: 05117 /05150
- ^{1} French Land Register data, which excludes lakes, ponds, glaciers > 1 km^{2} (0.386 sq mi or 247 acres) and river estuaries.

Ribeyret (French pronunciation: [ʁibeʁɛ]; Occitan: Ribeiret) is a commune in the Hautes-Alpes department in southeastern France.

== Population ==
Historical population
Year	Pop.	±% p.a.
1968	141	—
1975	123	−1.93%
1982	130	+0.79%
1990	125	−0.49%
1999	114	−1.02%
2007	106	−0.91%
2012	102	−0.77%
2017	113	+2.07%
2023	106	−1.06%
Source: INSEE

== See also ==
- Communes of the Hautes-Alpes department
