= Montjay, Hautes-Alpes =

Montjay
- Commune
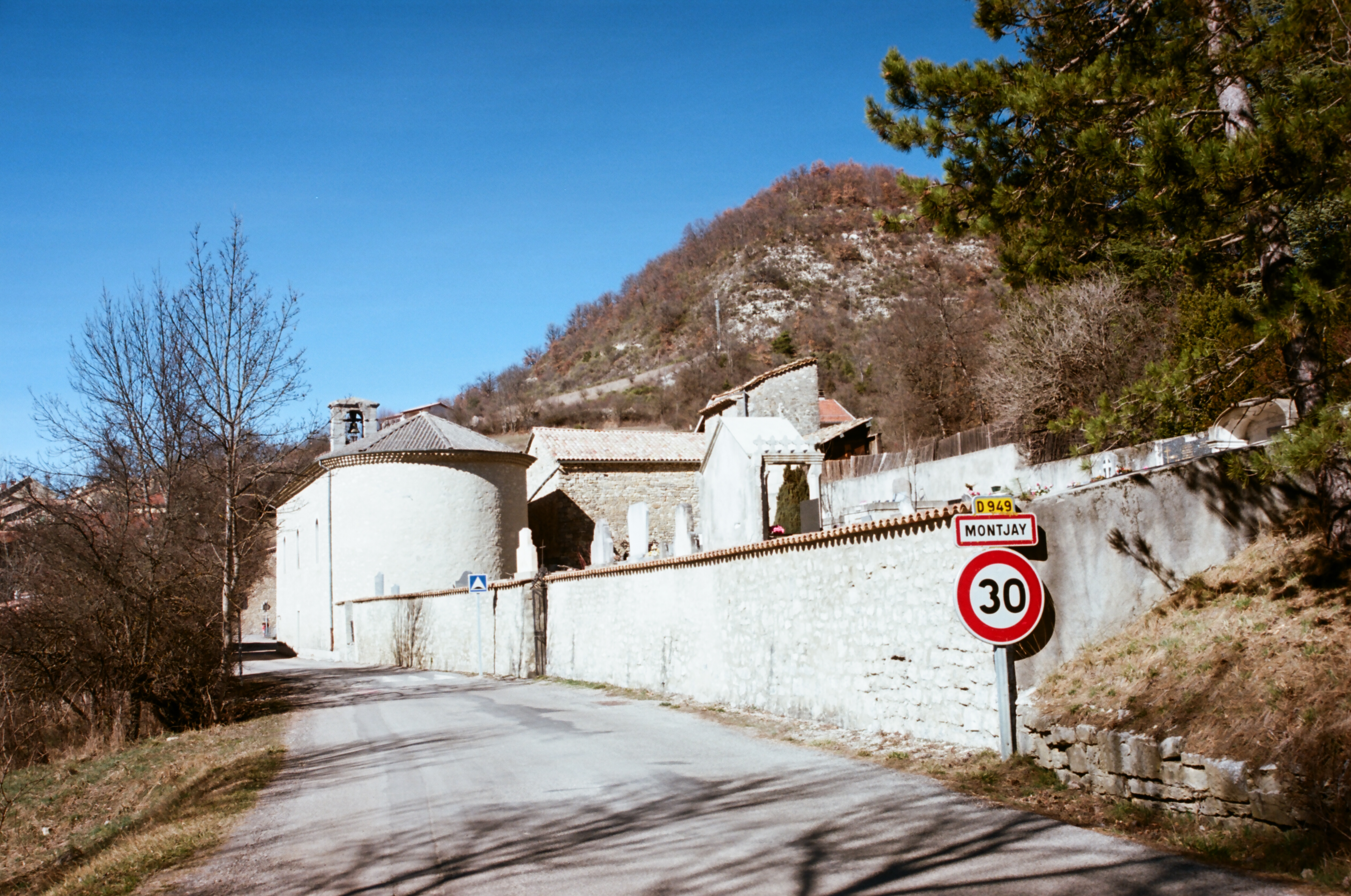

- Coat of arms
- Location of Montjay
- Location within France Location within Provence-Alpes-Côte d'Azur
- Coordinates: 44°21′39″N 5°36′16″E
- Country: France
- Region: Provence-Alpes-Côte d'Azur
- Department: Hautes-Alpes
- Arrondissement: Gap
- Canton: Serres

Government
  - Mayor (2026–32): Gilles Mâne
- Area^{1}: 27 km^{2} (10 sq mi)
- Elevation: 814 m (2,671 ft)
- Highest elevation: 1,298 m (4,259 ft)
- Lowest elevation: 764 m (2,507 ft)
- Population (2023): 104
  - Density: 3.9/km^{2} (10/sq mi)
- Time zone: UTC+01:00 (CET)
  - Summer (DST): UTC+02:00 (CEST)
- INSEE/Postal code: 05086 /05150
- ^{1} French Land Register data, which excludes lakes, ponds, glaciers > 1 km^{2} (0.386 sq mi or 247 acres) and river estuaries.

Montjay (French pronunciation: [mɔ̃ʒɛ]) is a commune in the Hautes-Alpes department in southeastern France.

== Population ==
Historical population
Year	Pop.	±% p.a.
1968	102	—
1975	76	−4.12%
1982	83	+1.27%
1990	86	+0.44%
1999	79	−0.94%
2007	98	+2.73%
2012	104	+1.20%
2017	104	+0.00%
2023	104	+0.00%
Source: INSEE

== See also ==
- Communes of the Hautes-Alpes department
