= Rosans =

- Commune
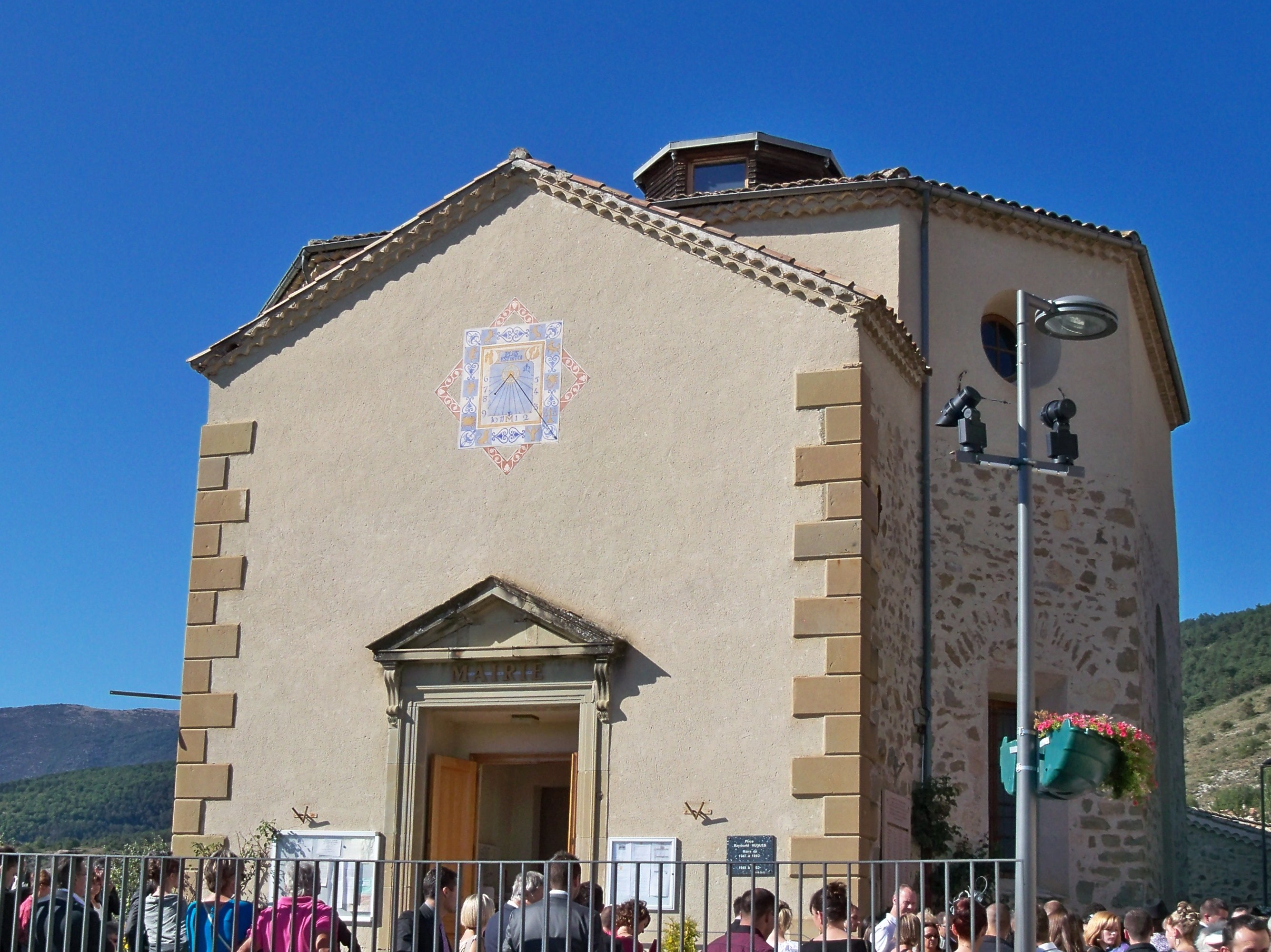
- The town hall of Rosans

- Coat of arms
- Location of Rosans
- Location within France Location within Provence-Alpes-Côte d'Azur
- Coordinates: 44°23′33″N 5°28′15″E
- Country: France
- Region: Provence-Alpes-Côte d'Azur
- Department: Hautes-Alpes
- Arrondissement: Gap
- Canton: Serres

Government
  - Mayor (2026–32): Lionel Tardy
- Area^{1}: 30.39 km^{2} (11.73 sq mi)
- Elevation: 704 m (2,310 ft)
- Highest elevation: 1,563 m (5,128 ft)
- Lowest elevation: 532 m (1,745 ft)
- Population (2023): 511
  - Density: 16.8/km^{2} (43.5/sq mi)
- Time zone: UTC+01:00 (CET)
  - Summer (DST): UTC+02:00 (CEST)
- INSEE/Postal code: 05126 /05150
- ^{1} French Land Register data, which excludes lakes, ponds, glaciers > 1 km^{2} (0.386 sq mi or 247 acres) and river estuaries.

Rosans (French pronunciation: [ʁozɑ̃]; Occitan: Rosan) is a commune in the Hautes-Alpes department in southeastern France.

== Population ==
Historical population
Year	Pop.	±% p.a.
1968	488	—
1975	515	+0.77%
1982	502	−0.36%
1990	506	+0.10%
1999	493	−0.29%
2007	523	+0.74%
2012	505	−0.70%
2017	468	−1.51%
2023	511	+1.48%
Source: INSEE

== See also ==
- Communes of the Hautes-Alpes department
