= Canton of Serres =

Coordinates: 44°25′46″N 5°42′56″E

Serres
- Canton
- Country: France
- Region: Provence-Alpes-Côte d'Azur
- Department: Hautes-Alpes
- No. of communes: {{{nbcomm}}}
- Area: 831.69 km^{2} (321.12 sq mi)
- Population (2023): 7,620
  - Density: 9.16/km^{2} (23.7/sq mi)
- INSEE code: 05 13

The canton of Serres is an administrative division in southeastern France. At the French canton reorganisation which came into effect in March 2015, the canton was expanded from 12 to 41 communes (6 of which merged into the new communes Garde-Colombe and Valdoule):

1. Aspremont
2. Aspres-sur-Buëch
3. La Bâtie-Montsaléon
4. La Beaume
5. Le Bersac
6. Chabestan
7. Chanousse
8. L'Épine
9. Étoile-Saint-Cyrice
10. La Faurie
11. Garde-Colombe
12. La Haute-Beaume
13. Méreuil
14. Montbrand
15. Montclus
16. Montjay
17. Montrond
18. Moydans
19. Nossage-et-Bénévent
20. Orpierre
21. Oze
22. La Piarre
23. Ribeyret
24. Rosans
25. Saint-André-de-Rosans
26. Saint-Auban-d'Oze
27. Sainte-Colombe
28. Saint-Julien-en-Beauchêne
29. Saint-Pierre-d'Argençon
30. Le Saix
31. Saléon
32. Savournon
33. Serres
34. Sigottier
35. Sorbiers
36. Trescléoux
37. Valdoule

== Demographics ==
Historical population
Year	Pop.	±% p.a.
2013	7,392	—
2018	7,560	+0.45%
Source: INSEE

== See also ==
- Cantons of the Hautes-Alpes department
- Communes of France
