= Écrins National Park =

French national park in Isère and Hautes-Alpes

- Parc national des Écrins
- IUCN category II (national park)
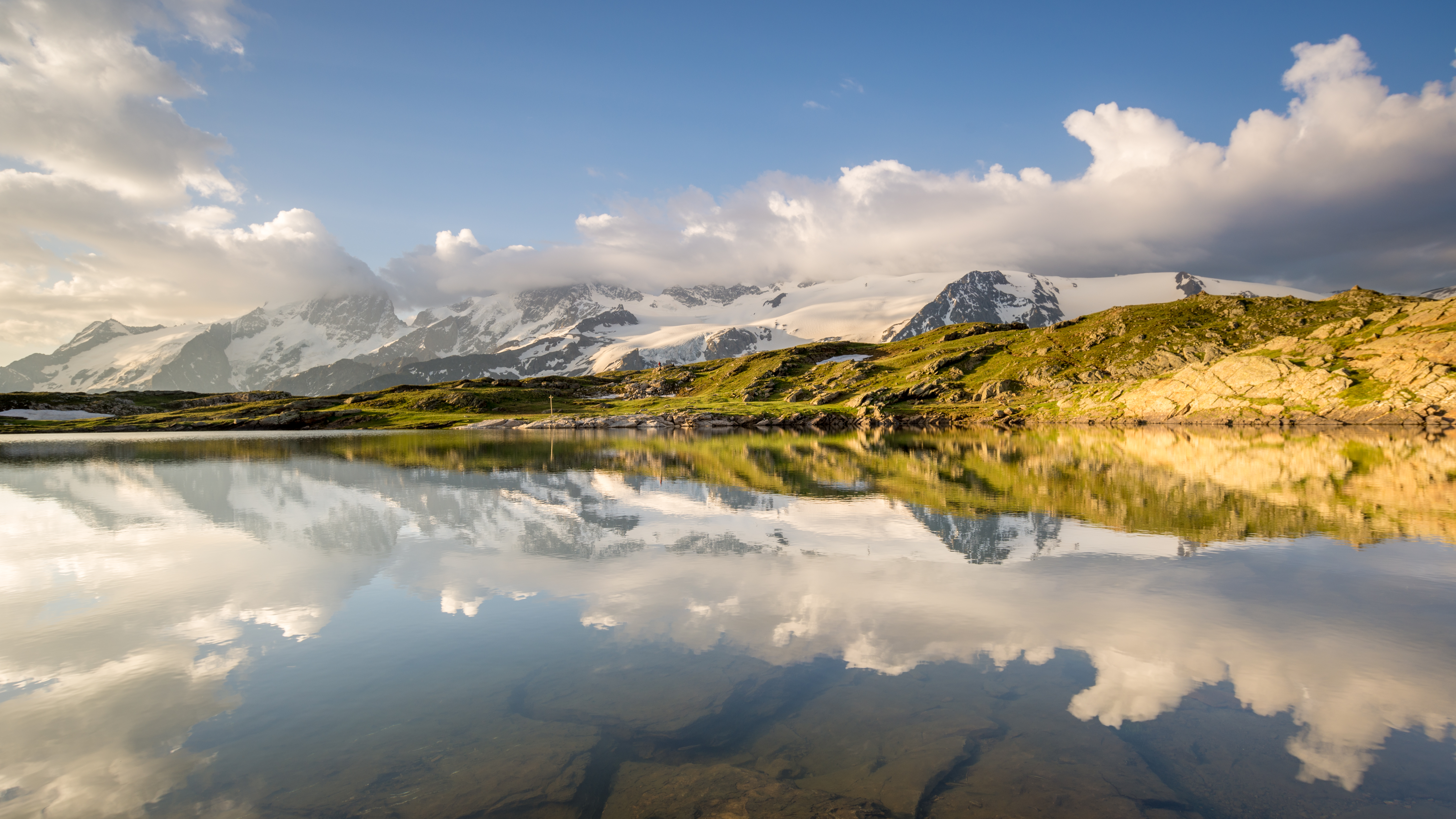
- Plateau d'Emparis

- Location within France
- Location: Isère and Hautes-Alpes, France
- Nearest city: Briançon; Gap; Grenoble
- Coordinates: 44°51′21″N 6°15′49″E
- Area: 925 km^{2} (357 sq mi)
- Established: 27 March 1973
- Governing body: Parcs nationaux de France

Écrins National Park (French: parc national des Écrins, pronounced [paʁk nɑsjɔnal dez‿ekʁɛ̃]; Occitan: parc Nacional dels Escrinhs) is a French national park located in the southeastern part of France in the Dauphiné Alps south of Grenoble and north of Gap, shared between the departments of Isère and Hautes-Alpes. The park is one of eight regions in France designated as French national parks.

== Geography ==
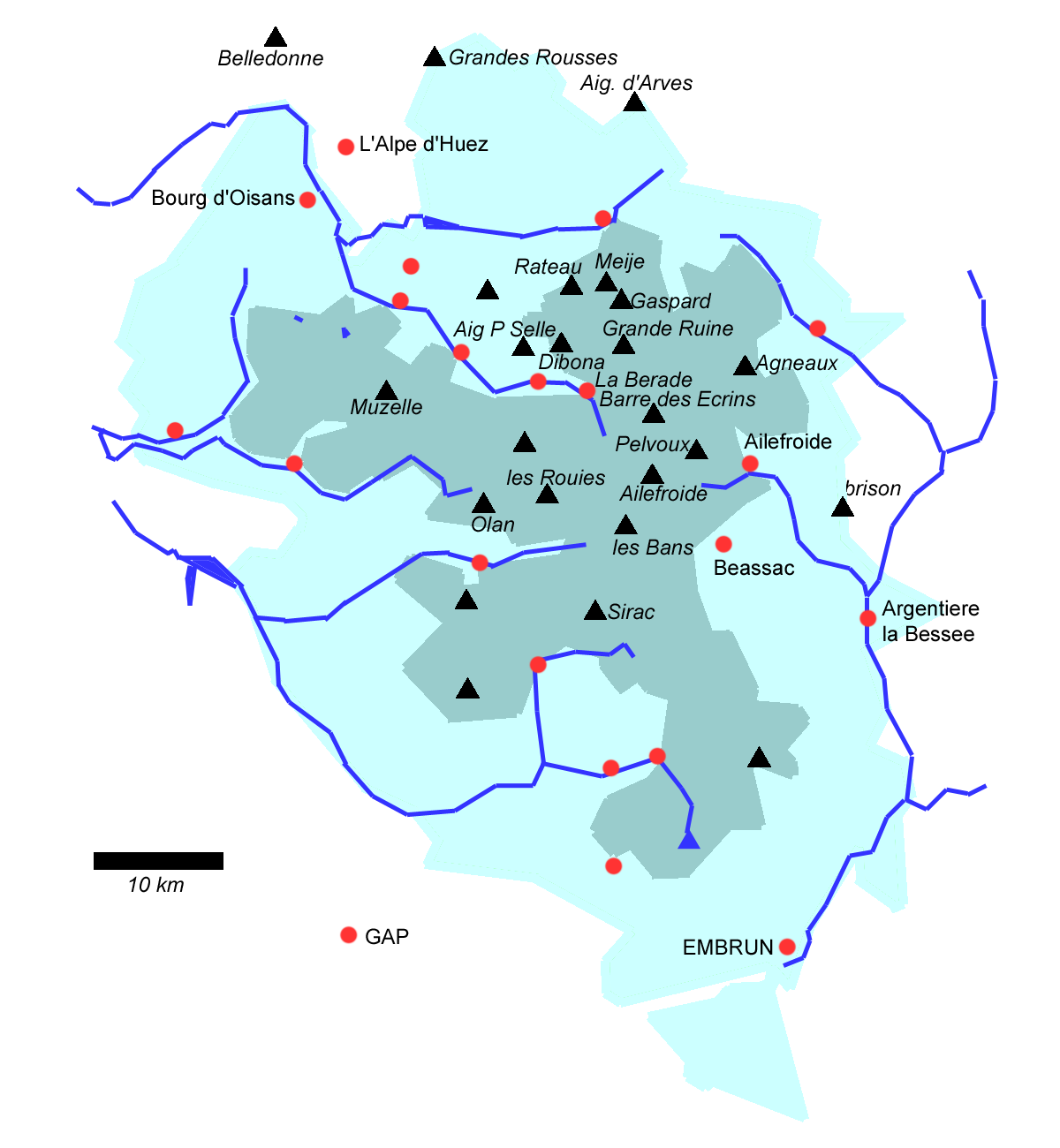
Borders of the park and principal summits, towns and rivers

It rises up to 4,102 m (13,458 ft) at the Barre des Écrins and covers 925 km^{2} (357 sq mi) of high mountain areas, with high peaks, glacier fields, glacier valleys, alpine pastures, subalpine woodlands and lakes. It attracts up to 800,000 tourists annually, in particular hikers and climbers. The park has been awarded the European Diploma of Protected Areas.

Its borders mostly correspond to these of the Massif des Écrins, delimited by the main valleys of rivers Drac, Romanche and Durance (with its Guisane dependency). Écrins National Park covers the territory of the following communes: Ancelle, Aspres-lès-Corps, Bénévent-et-Charbillac, Besse-en-Oisans, Buissard, Chabottes, Champcella, Champoléon, Chantelouve, Châteauroux-les-Alpes, Chauffayer, Clavans-en-Haut-Oisans, Crots, Embrun, Entraigues, Freissinières, L'Argentière-la-Bessée, La Chapelle-en-Valgaudémar, La Grave, La Motte-en-Champsaur, Lavaldens, Le Bourg-d'Oisans, Le Monêtier-les-Bains, Le Périer, Les Costes, Les Infournas, Les Vigneaux, Mizoën, Mont-de-Lans, Orcières, Oris-en-Rattier, Ornon, Oulles, Pelvoux, Prunières, Puy-Saint-Vincent, Puy-Saint-Eusèbe, Puy-Sanières, Réallon, Réotier, Saint-Apollinaire, Saint-Bonnet-en-Champsaur, Saint-Christophe-en-Oisans, Saint-Clément-sur-Durance, Saint-Eusèbe-en-Champsaur, Saint-Firmin, Saint-Jacques-en-Valgodemard, Saint-Jean-Saint-Nicolas, Saint-Julien-en-Champsaur, Saint-Léger-les-Mélèzes, Saint-Maurice-en-Valgodemard, Saint-Michel-de-Chaillol, Savines-le-Lac, Valbonnais, Valjouffrey, Vallouise, Vénosc, Villar-d'Arêne, Villard-Notre-Dame, Villard-Reymond and Villar-Loubière.

== See also ==
- Massif des Écrins
