= Arrondissement of Gap =

Coordinates: 44.57°N 6.08°E

Gap
- Arrondissement
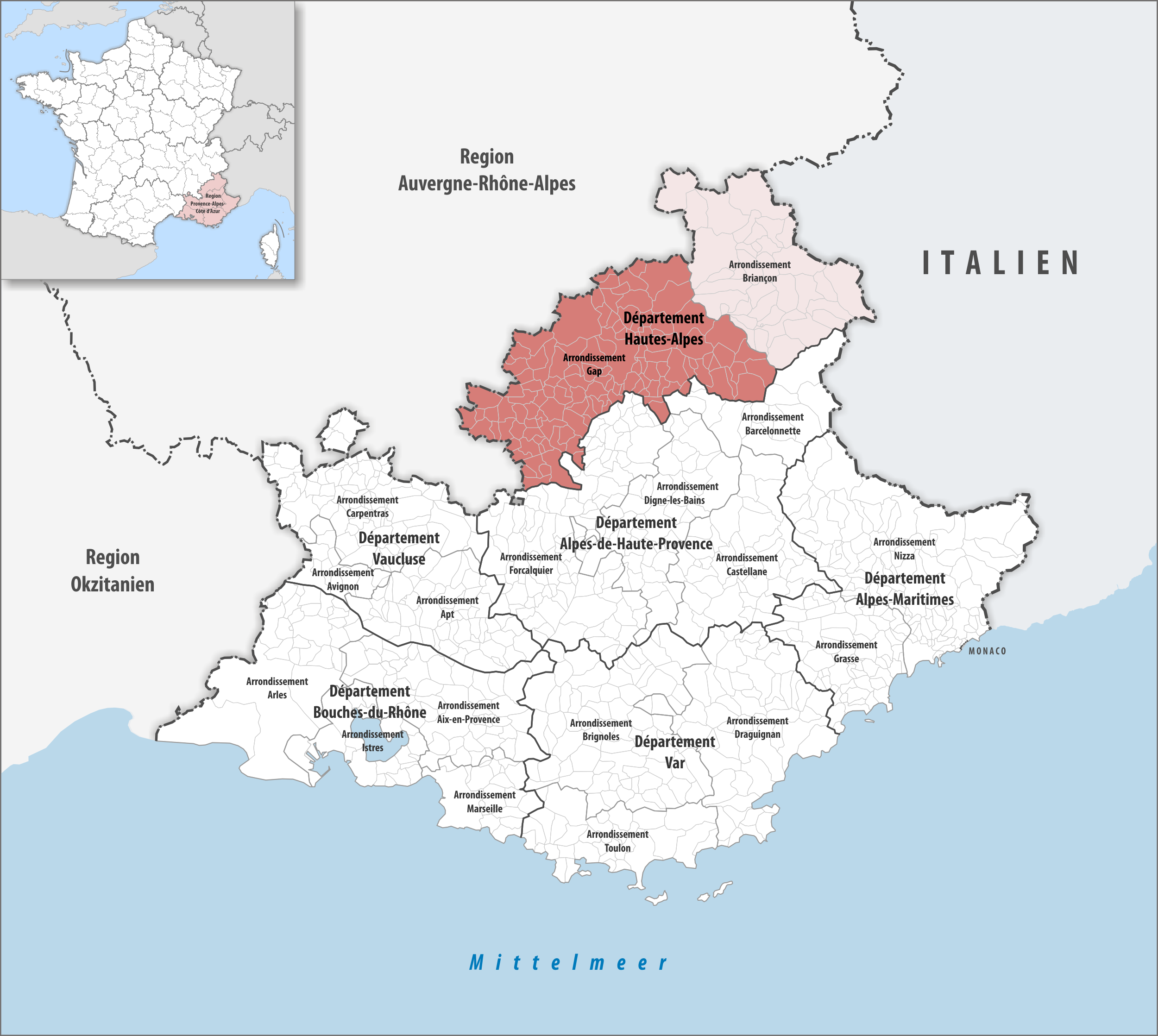
- Location within the region Provence-Alpes-Côte d'Azur
- Country: France
- Region: Provence-Alpes-Côte d'Azur
- Department: Hautes-Alpes
- No. of communes: {{{nbcomm}}}
- Area: 3,410.5 km^{2} (1,316.8 sq mi)
- Population (2023): 109,338
  - Density: 32.059/km^{2} (83.033/sq mi)
- INSEE code: 052

The arrondissement of Gap is an arrondissement of France in the Hautes-Alpes department in the Provence-Alpes-Côte d'Azur region. It has 126 communes. Its population is 107,672 (2021), and its area is 3,410.5 km^{2} (1,316.8 sq mi).

== Composition ==
The communes of the arrondissement of Gap, and their INSEE codes, are:

1. Ancelle (05004)
2. Aspremont (05008)
3. Aspres-lès-Corps (05009)
4. Aspres-sur-Buëch (05010)
5. Aubessagne (05039)
6. Avançon (05011)
7. Baratier (05012)
8. Barcillonnette (05013)
9. Barret-sur-Méouge (05014)
10. La Bâtie-Montsaléon (05016)
11. La Bâtie-Neuve (05017)
12. La Bâtie-Vieille (05018)
13. La Beaume (05019)
14. Le Bersac (05021)
15. Bréziers (05022)
16. Buissard (05025)
17. Chabestan (05028)
18. Chabottes (05029)
19. Champoléon (05032)
20. Chanousse (05033)
21. La Chapelle-en-Valgaudémar (05064)
22. Châteauneuf-d'Oze (05035)
23. Châteauroux-les-Alpes (05036)
24. Châteauvieux (05037)
25. Chorges (05040)
26. Crévoux (05044)
27. Crots (05045)
28. Dévoluy (05139)
29. Embrun (05046)
30. Éourres (05047)
31. L'Épine (05048)
32. Esparron (05049)
33. Espinasses (05050)
34. Étoile-Saint-Cyrice (05051)
35. La Fare-en-Champsaur (05054)
36. La Faurie (05055)
37. Forest-Saint-Julien (05056)
38. Fouillouse (05057)
39. La Freissinouse (05059)
40. Furmeyer (05060)
41. Gap (05061)
42. Garde-Colombe (05053)
43. Le Glaizil (05062)
44. La Haute-Beaume (05066)
45. Jarjayes (05068)
46. Laragne-Montéglin (05070)
47. Lardier-et-Valença (05071)
48. Laye (05072)
49. Lazer (05073)
50. Lettret (05074)
51. Manteyer (05075)
52. Méreuil (05076)
53. Monêtier-Allemont (05078)
54. Montbrand (05080)
55. Montclus (05081)
56. Montgardin (05084)
57. Montjay (05086)
58. Montmaur (05087)
59. Montrond (05089)
60. La Motte-en-Champsaur (05090)
61. Moydans (05091)
62. Neffes (05092)
63. Nossage-et-Bénévent (05094)
64. Le Noyer (05095)
65. Orcières (05096)
66. Orpierre (05097)
67. Les Orres (05098)
68. Oze (05099)
69. Pelleautier (05100)
70. La Piarre (05102)
71. Le Poët (05103)
72. Poligny (05104)
73. Prunières (05106)
74. Puy-Saint-Eusèbe (05108)
75. Puy-Sanières (05111)
76. Rabou (05112)
77. Rambaud (05113)
78. Réallon (05114)
79. Remollon (05115)
80. Ribeyret (05117)
81. Rochebrune (05121)
82. La Roche-des-Arnauds (05123)
83. La Rochette (05124)
84. Rosans (05126)
85. Rousset-Serre-Ponçon (05127)
86. Saint-André-d'Embrun (05128)
87. Saint-André-de-Rosans (05129)
88. Saint-Apollinaire (05130)
89. Saint-Auban-d'Oze (05131)
90. Saint-Bonnet-en-Champsaur (05132)
91. Sainte-Colombe (05135)
92. Saint-Étienne-le-Laus (05140)
93. Saint-Firmin (05142)
94. Saint-Jacques-en-Valgodemard (05144)
95. Saint-Jean-Saint-Nicolas (05145)
96. Saint-Julien-en-Beauchêne (05146)
97. Saint-Julien-en-Champsaur (05147)
98. Saint-Laurent-du-Cros (05148)
99. Saint-Léger-les-Mélèzes (05149)
100. Saint-Maurice-en-Valgodemard (05152)
101. Saint-Michel-de-Chaillol (05153)
102. Saint-Pierre-Avez (05155)
103. Saint-Pierre-d'Argençon (05154)
104. Saint-Sauveur (05156)
105. Le Saix (05158)
106. Saléon (05159)
107. Salérans (05160)
108. La Saulce (05162)
109. Le Sauze-du-Lac (05163)
110. Savines-le-Lac (05164)
111. Savournon (05165)
112. Serres (05166)
113. Sigottier (05167)
114. Sigoyer (05168)
115. Sorbiers (05169)
116. Tallard (05170)
117. Théus (05171)
118. Trescléoux (05172)
119. Upaix (05173)
120. Val Buëch-Méouge (05118)
121. Valdoule (05024)
122. Valserres (05176)
123. Ventavon (05178)
124. Veynes (05179)
125. Villar-Loubière (05182)
126. Vitrolles (05184)

== History ==
The arrondissement of Gap was created in 1800.

As a result of the reorganisation of the cantons of France which came into effect in 2015, the borders of the cantons are no longer related to the borders of the arrondissements. The cantons of the arrondissement of Gap were, as of January 2015:

1. Aspres-sur-Buëch
2. Barcillonnette
3. La Bâtie-Neuve
4. Chorges
5. Embrun
6. Gap-Campagne
7. Gap-Centre
8. Gap-Nord-Est
9. Gap-Nord-Ouest
10. Gap-Sud-Est
11. Gap-Sud-Ouest
12. Laragne-Montéglin
13. Orcières
14. Orpierre
15. Ribiers
16. Rosans
17. Saint-Bonnet-en-Champsaur
18. Saint-Étienne-en-Dévoluy
19. Saint-Firmin
20. Savines-le-Lac
21. Serres
22. Tallard
23. Veynes
