= Canton of Saint-Firmin =

Coordinates: 44°46′56″N 6°01′48″E

Saint-Firmin
- Former canton
- Interactive map of Saint-Firmin
- Country: France
- Region: Provence-Alpes-Côte d'Azur
- Department: Hautes-Alpes
- No. of communes: {{{nbcomm}}}
- Disbanded: 2015
- Area: 254.62 km^{2} (98.31 sq mi)
- Population (2012): 1,625
  - Density: 6.382/km^{2} (16.53/sq mi)

The canton of Saint-Firmin is a former administrative division in southeastern France. It was disbanded following the French canton reorganisation which came into effect in March 2015. It consisted of 8 communes, which joined the canton of Saint-Bonnet-en-Champsaur in 2015. It had 1,625 inhabitants (2012).

The canton comprised the following communes:

- Aspres-lès-Corps
- Chauffayer
- Le Glaizil
- La Chapelle-en-Valgaudémar
- Saint-Firmin
- Saint-Jacques-en-Valgodemard
- Saint-Maurice-en-Valgodemard
- Villar-Loubière

== Demographics ==
Historical population Canton of Saint-Firmin
Year	1962	1968	1975	1982	1990	1999
Pop.	1,829	1,984	1,930	1,725	1,543	1,565
±%	—	+8.5%	−2.7%	−10.6%	−10.6%	+1.4%
From the year 1962 on: No double counting – residents of multiple communes (e.g. students and military personnel) are counted only once. Source: INSEE

== See also ==
- Cantons of the Hautes-Alpes department
