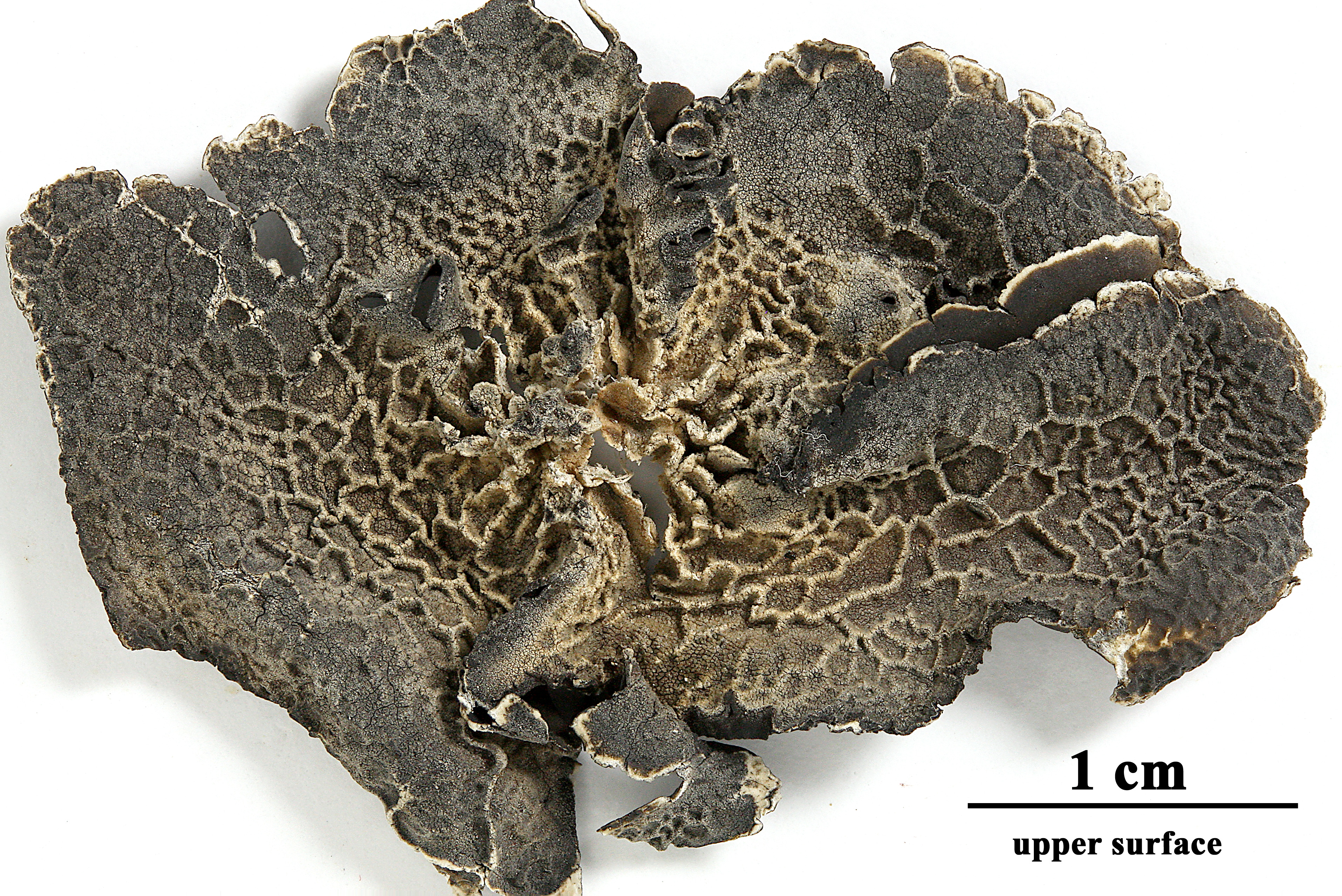

Conservation status
- Apparently Secure (NatureServe)

Scientific classification
- Kingdom: Fungi
- Division: Ascomycota
- Class: Lecanoromycetes
- Order: Umbilicariales
- Family: Umbilicariaceae
- Genus: Umbilicaria
- Species: U. decussata

Binomial name
- Umbilicaria decussata (Vill.) Zahlbr. (1932)

Synonyms
- Lichen decussatus Vill. (1789); Gyrophora decussata (Vill.) Zahlbr. (1927); Agyrophora decussata (Vill.) Gyeln. (1932); Omphalodiscus decussatus (Vill.) Schol. (1936)

= Umbilicaria decussata =

Species of lichen

Umbilicaria decussata is a widespread species of saxicolous (rock-dwelling) foliose lichen in the family Umbilicariaceae. It typically grows in high-elevation alpine environments.

== Taxonomy ==
It was described as a new species in 1789 by the French botanist and lichenologist Dominique Villars, who placed it in the eponymous genus Lichen. In his original description, Villars characterised the species as a cartilaginous lichen with a black lower surface and brown upper surface, divided into three to five wedge-shaped segments that form a cross-like pattern in the centre. He noted its distinctive transverse wrinkles and reticulated folds formed by the raised epidermis, and observed that fruiting bodies, appearing as large black spots, were rare along the margins. The type locality was given as granitic rocks in the high Alps, specifically mentioning the areas of Valgaudemar, Champoléon, and Vieux Chaillol. Villars also tentatively linked his species to an earlier illustration by Johann Jacob Dillenius, though he expressed uncertainty about this connection. In 1932, Alexander Zahlbruckner transferred the taxon to the genus Umbilicaria to give it the name by which it is now known.

== Description ==
Umbilicaria decussata forms stiff, circular patches (known as thalli) up to 5 cm across. Each thallus attaches to the rock at a central point on its underside, like an umbrella. The upper surface ranges from light to dark grey and has a distinctive pattern of sharp ridges that radiate outward from the centre, becoming a more net-like pattern of weaker ridges toward the edges. In older parts of the lichen, particularly near the centre, the surface develops a white weathered layer.

The underside of the thallus is sooty black due to a dense covering of tiny, dark spores called thalloconidia. These spores are either spherical or egg-shaped and measure about 7 μm across. While these spores typically cover the entire underside in multiple layers, some specimens may have a narrow band around the edge where they are absent, revealing the lichen's natural light grey to brown colouring underneath.

Reproductive structures (apothecia) are rarely seen in this species. When present, these appear as small black discs raised on short stalks. This matches Villars's original 1789 description, where he noted that the fruiting bodies appeared as large black spots along the margins and were uncommonly seen.

The lichen's species epithet decussata refers to the cross-like pattern formed by its ridges, a feature that Villars highlighted in his first description of the species. This pattern, along with its stiff, cartilage-like texture and distinctive colouring (brown-grey above and black below), helps distinguish it from related species.

== Habitat and distribution ==
Umbilicaria decussata is a cosmopolitan lichen species found on all continents, including Antarctica, with a particularly strong presence in high alpine environments. It typically grows at elevations between 4,500 and 5,000 metres above sea level, where it colonises siliceous (silicon-rich) rocks, especially on the vertical faces of large, wind-exposed boulders. Its preference for sites that remain above the winter snowline is characteristic of its ecological niche in these extreme environments.

While the species has a global distribution, it shows varying abundance across different mountain ranges. In South America, it can be found along the entire length of the Andes mountain chain, from Venezuela in the north to Patagonia in the south, though it is considerably less common in these regions compared to other parts of its range. Its presence in Europe was first documented in the French Alps, where it was originally discovered growing on granitic rocks in several high-altitude locations.

Laboratory studies have shown that U. decussata show considerable resilience to photoinhibition (light-induced stress) compared to other Antarctic lichens. When exposed to high-intensity light at low temperatures (5°C), simulating summer conditions in Antarctica, it demonstrated more efficient recovery mechanisms and better photoprotective capabilities than the fruticose lichen species Usnea antarctica. This adaptability helps explain its success in exposed, high-altitude habitats where intense light stress is common, particularly during periods when the thallus is hydrated from melting snow or precipitation.
