= Canton of Orcières =

Coordinates: 44°41′07″N 6°19′33″E

Orcières
- Former canton
- Interactive map of Orcières
- Country: France
- Region: Provence-Alpes-Côte d'Azur
- Department: Hautes-Alpes
- No. of communes: {{{nbcomm}}}
- Disbanded: 2015
- Area: 233.98 km^{2} (90.34 sq mi)
- Population (2012): 1,853
  - Density: 7.919/km^{2} (20.51/sq mi)

The canton of Orcières is a former administrative division in southeastern France. It was disbanded following the French canton reorganisation which came into effect in March 2015. It consisted of 3 communes, which joined the canton of Saint-Bonnet-en-Champsaur in 2015. It had 1,853 inhabitants (2012).

The canton comprised the following communes:

- Champoléon
- Orcières
- Saint-Jean-Saint-Nicolas

== Demographics ==
Historical population Canton of Orcières
Year	1962	1968	1975	1982	1990	1999
Pop.	1,309	1,564	1,711	1,829	1,808	1,704
±%	—	+19.5%	+9.4%	+6.9%	−1.1%	−5.8%
From the year 1962 on: No double counting – residents of multiple communes (e.g. students and military personnel) are counted only once. Source: INSEE

== See also ==
- Cantons of the Hautes-Alpes department
