= La Fare-en-Champsaur =

- Commune
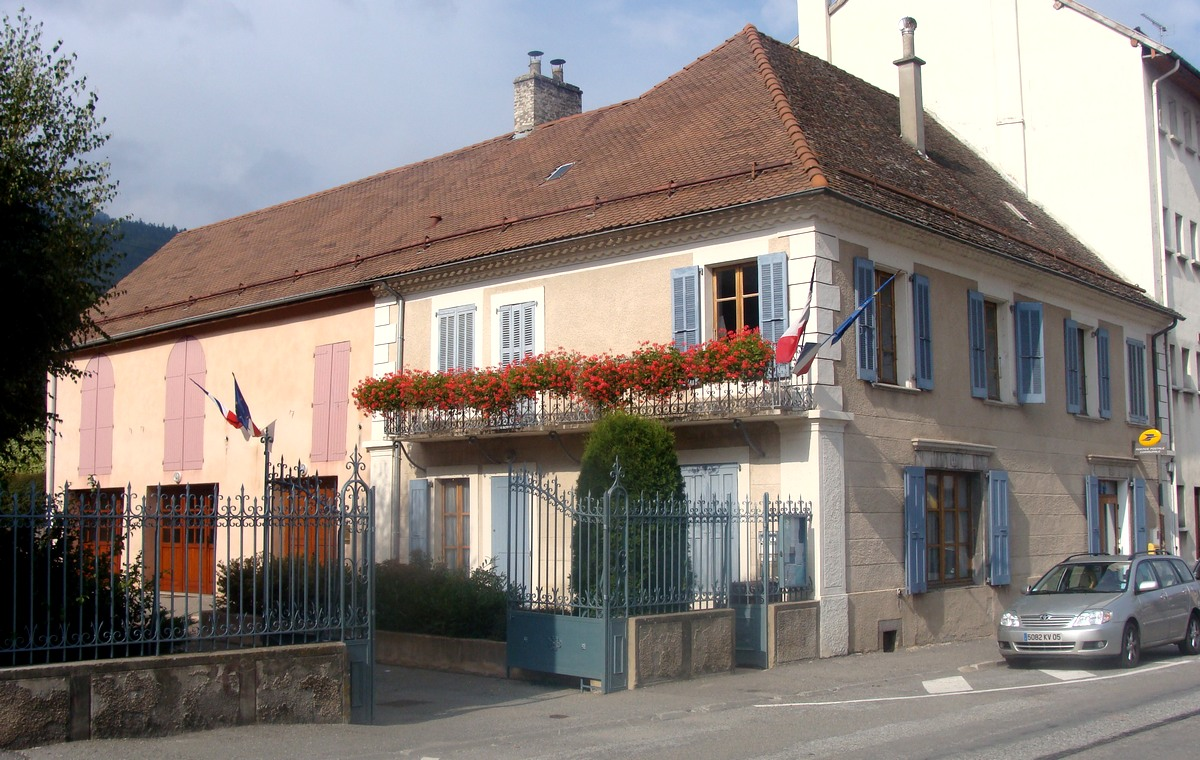
- Town hall and post office

- Coat of arms
- Location of La Fare-en-Champsaur
- Location within France Location within Provence-Alpes-Côte d'Azur
- Coordinates: 44°40′35″N 6°04′20″E
- Country: France
- Region: Provence-Alpes-Côte d'Azur
- Department: Hautes-Alpes
- Arrondissement: Gap
- Canton: Saint-Bonnet-en-Champsaur

Government
  - Mayor (2026–32): Benoît Conseil
- Area^{1}: 10.27 km^{2} (3.97 sq mi)
- Elevation: 900 m (3,000 ft)
- Highest elevation: 2,082 m (6,831 ft)
- Lowest elevation: 949 m (3,114 ft)
- Population (2023): 482
  - Density: 46.9/km^{2} (122/sq mi)
- Time zone: UTC+01:00 (CET)
  - Summer (DST): UTC+02:00 (CEST)
- INSEE/Postal code: 05054 /05500
- ^{1} French Land Register data, which excludes lakes, ponds, glaciers > 1 km^{2} (0.386 sq mi or 247 acres) and river estuaries.

La Fare-en-Champsaur (French pronunciation: [la faʁɑ̃ ʃɑ̃psɔʁ]; Occitan: La Fara de Champsaur, [la ˈfaɾɔ ˈde ʃampˈsaw]) is a commune in the department of Hautes-Alpes, in the region of Provence-Alpes-Côte d'Azur, southeastern France.

== Geography ==
The commune is located in the western part of Champsaur on the left bank of the river Drac opposite Saint-Bonnet-en-Champsaur. It is backed by Mount Mouttet in the foothills of the Dévoluy massif. Its geographical position gives it a pleasant climate in summer but colder in winter.

The town extends from the river Drac (at an elevation of 950m downstream from the bridge of Saint-Bonnet-en-Champsaur) to the heights of Coste Folle (alt. 2079m). The terrain consists of:

- the edge of the Drac which is now largely constrained by the road;
- the Chaup plain, the ancient area of the glacial valley which provides a plateau for crops and pastures;
- a forest of pine and larch which is used for its timber;
- unusable cliffs and rocky slopes;
- some easily accessible areas high on Mount Mouttet.

The old town consists of three closely sited hamlets called Les Farelles, La Fare and Le Serre, and is located on the Chaup plain at an elevation of 1100 metres. This is the older part of the village which is exclusively agricultural and very poor.

The lower part of the village, Les Baraques, Les Allards and Bonnette) was developed around the Grenoble - Gap road (route nationale 85) on the Route Napoléon with a hotel, a tourist office, a cafe and several shops including a supermarket. The council has recently been moved from the old town to Les Baraques.

La Fare communicates with Saint-Bonnet, the 'capital' of Champsaur, via the only bridge on the Drac. The two municipalities are complementary: Saint-Bonnet offers a greater range of services and businesses but is off the main road, and La Fare, which is smaller but better placed, acts as a suburb of the town.

== History ==
The hamlet of Les Baraques (or Barraques) was originally a relay stop for stagecoaches (the term 'baraque' describes the stables for horses on the great journeys of the eighteenth and nineteenth centuries.) It was an important stop at the foot of the Col Bayard, on the road joining Dauphiné to the province of Gap which was then under the political authority of Dauphiné. The bridge was also a crossroads, particularly important when François de Bonne of Lesdiguières, steward of Dauphiné, returned to the town of Saint-Bonnet.

Les Baraques, therefore, was a place where there were food and shelter, and this continues today. The hamlet has never changed its name, but the town hall was recently moved there, and it is now the name of the town ('La Fare') which appears on signs at the entrance to the village.

== Population ==
Historical population
Year	Pop.	±% p.a.
1968	354	—
1975	397	+1.65%
1982	409	+0.43%
1990	422	+0.39%
1999	413	−0.24%
2007	421	+0.24%
2012	470	+2.23%
2017	438	−1.40%
2023	482	+1.61%
Source: INSEE

== Sights ==
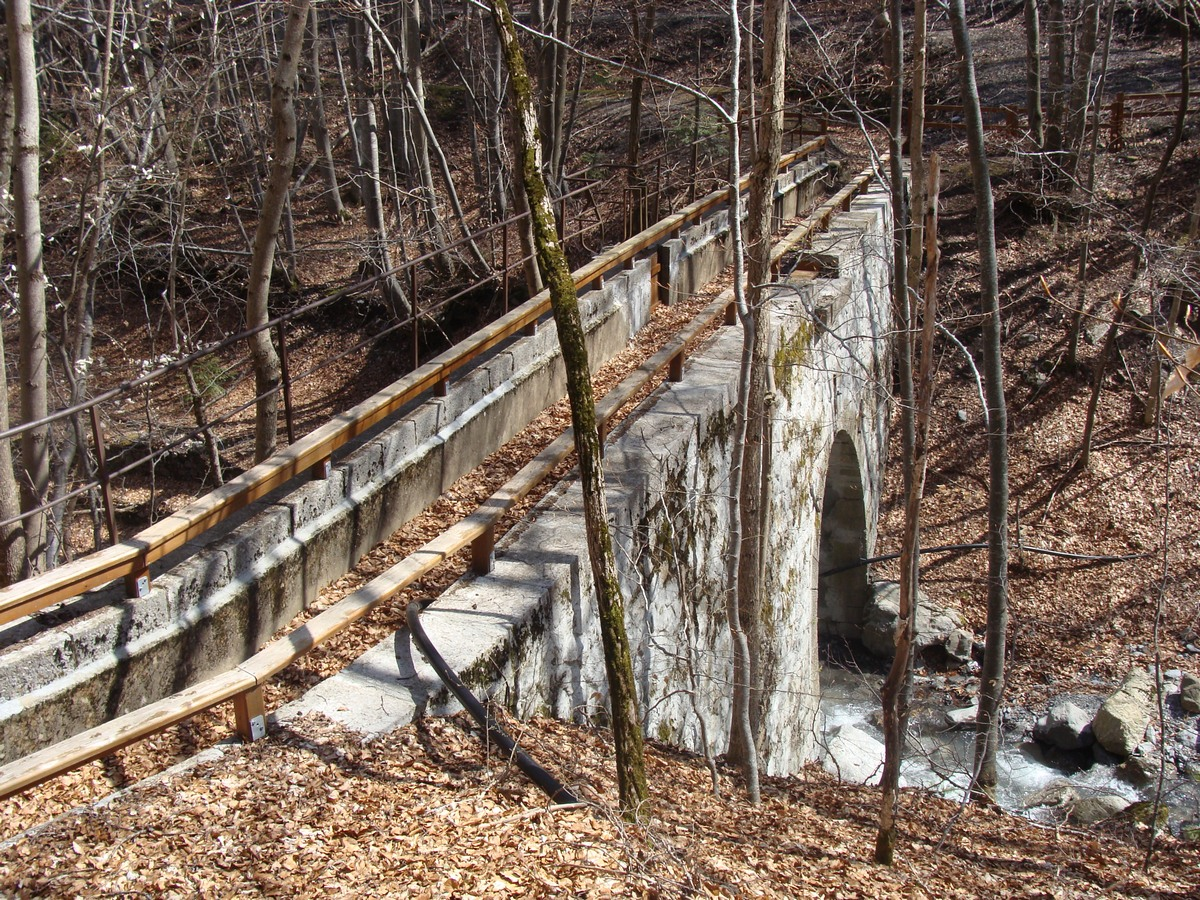
The Pont-du-Fossé canal in the woods above La Fare

- The old village and its church and cemetery;
- The aqueduct of the Pont-du-Fossé canal on La Fare stream (nineteenth century);
- The site of Notre-Dame de Bois-Vert, with views of Saint-Bonnet and the Vieux Chaillol massif, and the starting point for walks in a larch forest (alt. 1360 meters, accessible by car). In winter, a waterfall of ice attracts climbers;
- Mount Mouttet and its cliffs, a view on the valley and mountains surrounding the Queyras valley to the east of the Alps (altitude 1800 m., accessible only to experienced walkers);
- Developments in kayaking and canoeing on the Drac from the Saint-Bonnet bridge to the La Guinguette bridge 5 km downstream;

== See also ==
- Communes of the Hautes-Alpes department
