= Le Noyer, Hautes-Alpes =

Le Noyer
- Commune
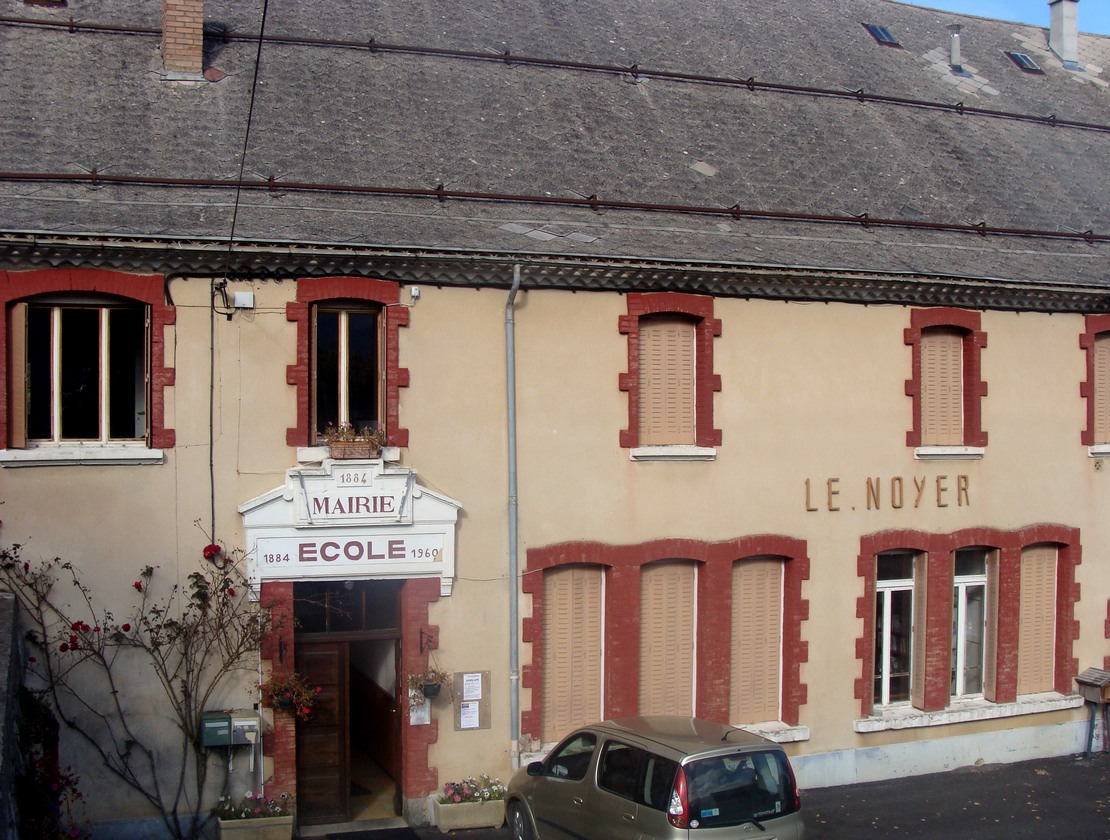
- The town hall and former school of Le Noyer

- Coat of arms
- Location of Le Noyer
- Location within France Location within Provence-Alpes-Côte d'Azur
- Coordinates: 44°41′57″N 6°00′47″E
- Country: France
- Region: Provence-Alpes-Côte d'Azur
- Department: Hautes-Alpes
- Arrondissement: Gap
- Canton: Saint-Bonnet-en-Champsaur

Government
  - Mayor (2026–32): Martine Py
- Area^{1}: 21.5 km^{2} (8.3 sq mi)
- Elevation: 1,120 m (3,670 ft)
- Highest elevation: 2,563 m (8,409 ft)
- Lowest elevation: 839 m (2,753 ft)
- Population (2023): 310
  - Density: 14/km^{2} (37/sq mi)
- Time zone: UTC+01:00 (CET)
  - Summer (DST): UTC+02:00 (CEST)
- INSEE/Postal code: 05095 /05500
- ^{1} French Land Register data, which excludes lakes, ponds, glaciers > 1 km^{2} (0.386 sq mi or 247 acres) and river estuaries.

Le Noyer (Occitan: Nuc) is a commune in the Hautes-Alpes department in southeastern France. With its neighbouring hamlets of Le Serre, Le Martouret and Le Villard, it lies on the banks of the river Drac, close to the Écrins National Park.

== Administration ==
=== List of mayors ===
- GAUTHIER Dominique Laurent (1798–1800)
- GAUTHIER Jacques (1800–1815)
- JOUBERT Jean Jacques (1815–1831)
- BERNARD Dominique (1831–1834)
- JOUBERT Jean Jacques (1834–1842)
- BEAUME Philippe (1842–1846)
- GAUTHIER Balthazard (1846–1848)
- DASTREVIGNE Jean Jacques (1848–1865)
- DISDIER Hyppolite (1865–1873)
- BEAUME Philippe (1873–1876)
- FAUQUE Édouard (1876–1886)
- VILLAR Jean Antoine (1886–1891)
- BEAUME Alphonse (1891–1894)
- VILLAR Jean Alexandre (1894–1907)
- DISDIER Hyppolite (1907–1908)
- ROUX Constantin (1908–1912)
- FABRE Joseph (1912–1913)
- ENCOYAND Joseph (1913–1921)
- BEAUME Alphonse (1921–1944)
- BLANC Jean (1944–1945)
- GUILLAUMIER Émile (1945–1947)
- VILLAR Louis (1947–1959)
- FAUQUE Edouard (1959–1989)
- FOUGAIROLLE Jacques (1989–2001)
- LEDUC Jean (2001–2008)
- FOUGAIROLLE Jacques (2008–2014)
- NOUGUIER Renée (2014–2020)
- PY Martine (2020–2032)

== Population ==
Historical population

Year	Pop.	±% p.a.
1793	720	—
1861	823	+0.20%
1911	529	−0.88%
1962	289	−1.18%
1968	263	−1.56%
1975	219	−2.58%
1982	215	−0.26%

Year	Pop.	±% p.a.
1990	243	+1.54%
1999	222	−1.00%
2007	251	+1.55%
2012	271	+1.55%
2017	292	+1.50%
2023	310	+1.00%

Source: EHESS, INSEE

== See also ==
- Communes of the Hautes-Alpes department
