= Saint-Laurent-du-Cros =

- Commune
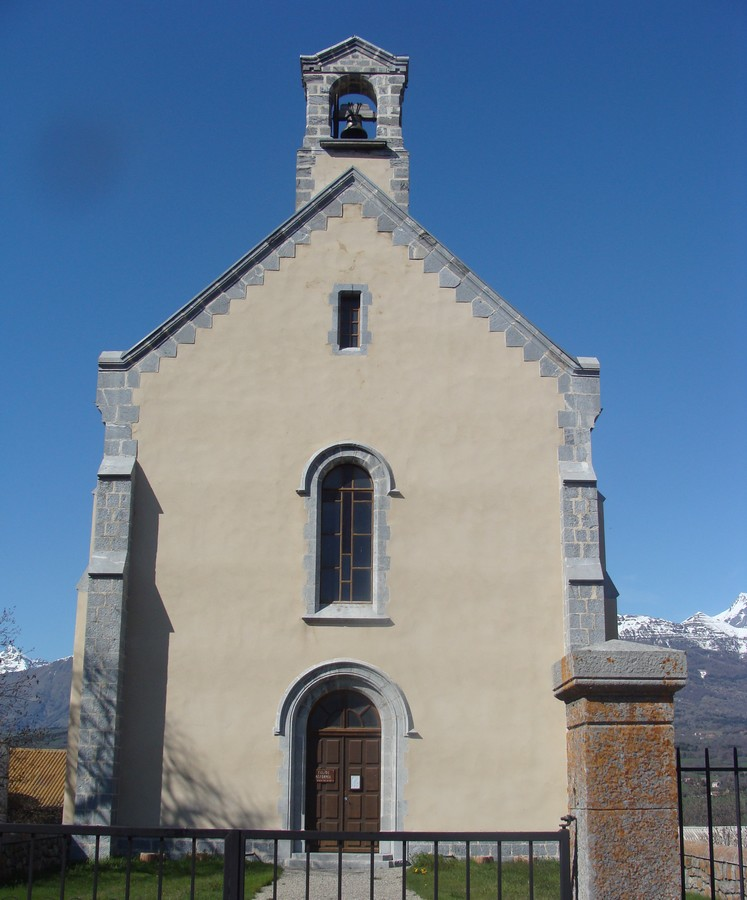
- The church of Saint-Laurent-du-Cros

- Coat of arms
- Location of Saint-Laurent-du-Cros
- Location within France Location within Provence-Alpes-Côte d'Azur
- Coordinates: 44°38′40″N 6°06′41″E
- Country: France
- Region: Provence-Alpes-Côte d'Azur
- Department: Hautes-Alpes
- Arrondissement: Gap
- Canton: Saint-Bonnet-en-Champsaur

Government
  - Mayor (2026–32): Jean-Marie Amar
- Area^{1}: 12.69 km^{2} (4.90 sq mi)
- Elevation: 1,020 m (3,350 ft)
- Highest elevation: 1,366 m (4,482 ft)
- Lowest elevation: 979 m (3,212 ft)
- Population (2023): 580
  - Density: 46/km^{2} (120/sq mi)
- Time zone: UTC+01:00 (CET)
  - Summer (DST): UTC+02:00 (CEST)
- INSEE/Postal code: 05148 /05500
- ^{1} French Land Register data, which excludes lakes, ponds, glaciers > 1 km^{2} (0.386 sq mi or 247 acres) and river estuaries.

Saint-Laurent-du-Cros is a commune in the Hautes-Alpes department in southeastern France.

== Population ==
Historical population
| Year | Pop. | ±% p.a. |
|---|---|---|
| 1968 | 412 | — |
| 1975 | 351 | −2.26% |
| 1982 | 320 | −1.31% |
| 1990 | 332 | +0.46% |
| 1999 | 421 | +2.67% |
| 2007 | 522 | +2.72% |
| 2012 | 507 | −0.58% |
| 2017 | 532 | +0.97% |
| 2023 | 580 | +1.45% |
Source: INSEE

== See also ==
- Communes of the Hautes-Alpes department
