= Poligny, Hautes-Alpes =

Poligny
- Commune
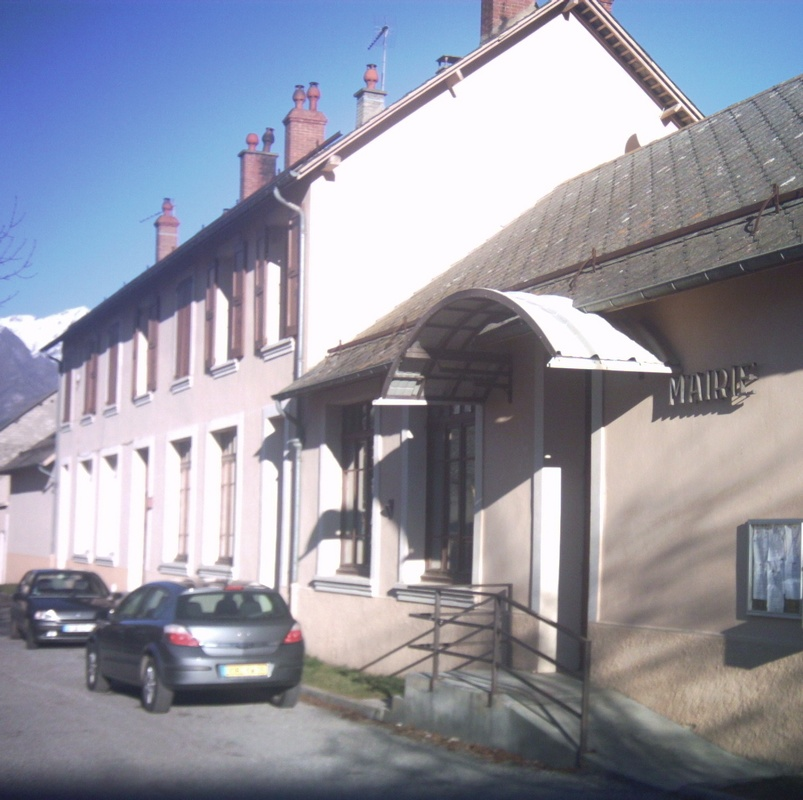
- Town hall

- Coat of arms
- Location of Poligny
- Location within France Location within Provence-Alpes-Côte d'Azur
- Coordinates: 44°41′33″N 6°02′52″E
- Country: France
- Region: Provence-Alpes-Côte d'Azur
- Department: Hautes-Alpes
- Arrondissement: Gap
- Canton: Saint-Bonnet-en-Champsaur

Government
  - Mayor (2026–32): Pierre-Jean Eymar-Dauphin
- Area^{1}: 13.81 km^{2} (5.33 sq mi)
- Elevation: 1,062 m (3,484 ft)
- Highest elevation: 2,082 m (6,831 ft)
- Lowest elevation: 896 m (2,940 ft)
- Population (2023): 338
  - Density: 24.5/km^{2} (63.4/sq mi)
- Time zone: UTC+01:00 (CET)
  - Summer (DST): UTC+02:00 (CEST)
- INSEE/Postal code: 05104 /05500
- ^{1} French Land Register data, which excludes lakes, ponds, glaciers > 1 km^{2} (0.386 sq mi or 247 acres) and river estuaries.

Poligny (French pronunciation: [pɔliɲi]) is a commune in the Hautes-Alpes department in southeastern France.

== Population ==
Historical population
Year	Pop.	±% p.a.
1968	262	—
1975	232	−1.72%
1982	219	−0.82%
1990	237	+0.99%
1999	230	−0.33%
2007	294	+3.12%
2012	344	+3.19%
2017	296	−2.96%
2023	338	+2.24%
Source: INSEE

== See also ==
- Communes of the Hautes-Alpes department
