= Forest-Saint-Julien =

- Commune
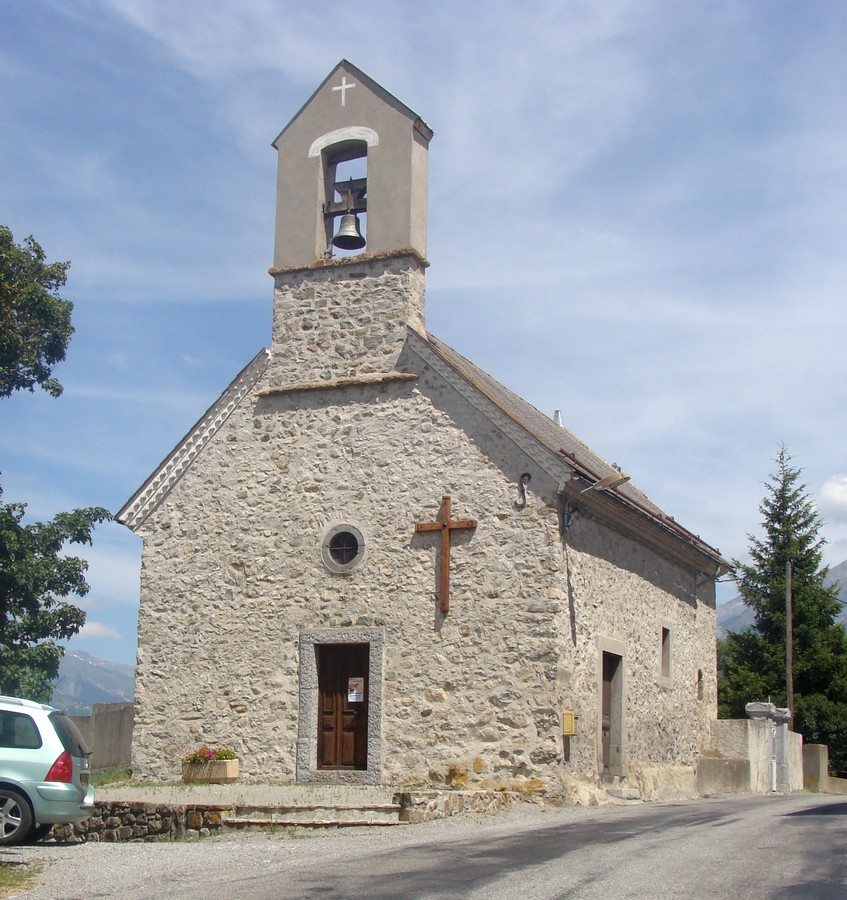
- The chapel of Forest-Saint-Julien

- Coat of arms
- Location of Forest-Saint-Julien
- Location within France Location within Provence-Alpes-Côte d'Azur
- Coordinates: 44°38′05″N 6°08′11″E
- Country: France
- Region: Provence-Alpes-Côte d'Azur
- Department: Hautes-Alpes
- Arrondissement: Gap
- Canton: Saint-Bonnet-en-Champsaur
- Intercommunality: Champsaur-Valgaudemar

Government
  - Mayor (2026–32): Fabrice Borel
- Area^{1}: 6.95 km^{2} (2.68 sq mi)
- Elevation: 1,200 m (3,900 ft)
- Highest elevation: 1,631 m (5,351 ft)
- Lowest elevation: 1,015 m (3,330 ft)
- Population (2023): 353
  - Density: 50.8/km^{2} (132/sq mi)
- Time zone: UTC+01:00 (CET)
  - Summer (DST): UTC+02:00 (CEST)
- INSEE/Postal code: 05056 /05260
- ^{1} French Land Register data, which excludes lakes, ponds, glaciers > 1 km^{2} (0.386 sq mi or 247 acres) and river estuaries.

Forest-Saint-Julien (French pronunciation: [fɔʁɛ sɛ̃ ʒyljɛ̃]; Vivaro-Alpine: Forest Sant Julian) is a commune of the Hautes-Alpes department in Southeastern France.

== Population ==
Historical population
Year	Pop.	±% p.a.
1968	231	—
1975	197	−2.25%
1982	177	−1.52%
1990	178	+0.07%
1999	218	+2.28%
2007	270	+2.71%
2012	293	+1.65%
2017	328	+2.28%
2023	353	+1.23%
Source: INSEE

== See also ==
- Communes of the Hautes-Alpes department
