= Vieux Chaillol =

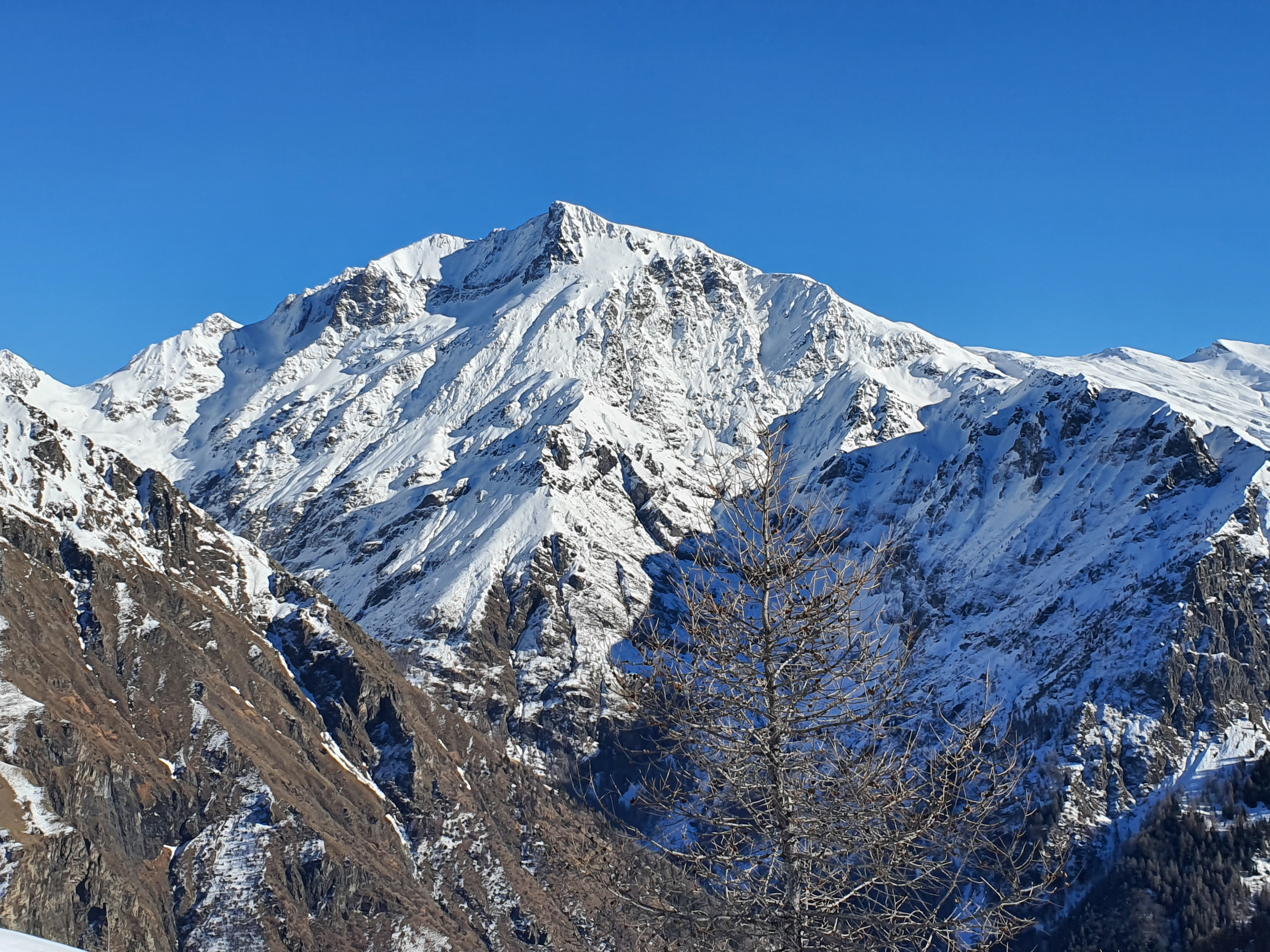
- Vieux Chaillol from the Cendrié pass

Highest point
- Elevation: 3,163 m (10,377 ft)
- Prominence: 678 m (2,224 ft)
- Listing: Alpine mountains above 3000 m
- Coordinates: 44°44′07″N 6°11′25″E

Geography
- Location within Alps
- Location: Hautes-Alpes, France
- Parent range: Massif des Écrins

The Vieux Chaillol (French pronunciation: [vjø ʃajɔl]; Occitan: Vièlh Chalhòl) is a mountain in the Écrins National Park, located in Hautes-Alpes, southeastern France. It has an elevation of 3,163 Meters above sea level and forms a moderate to hard, full day hike from the starting point in the village of Chaillol 1600 or from the township of Saint-Michel-de-Chaillol.
