= Laye, Hautes-Alpes =

Laye
- Commune
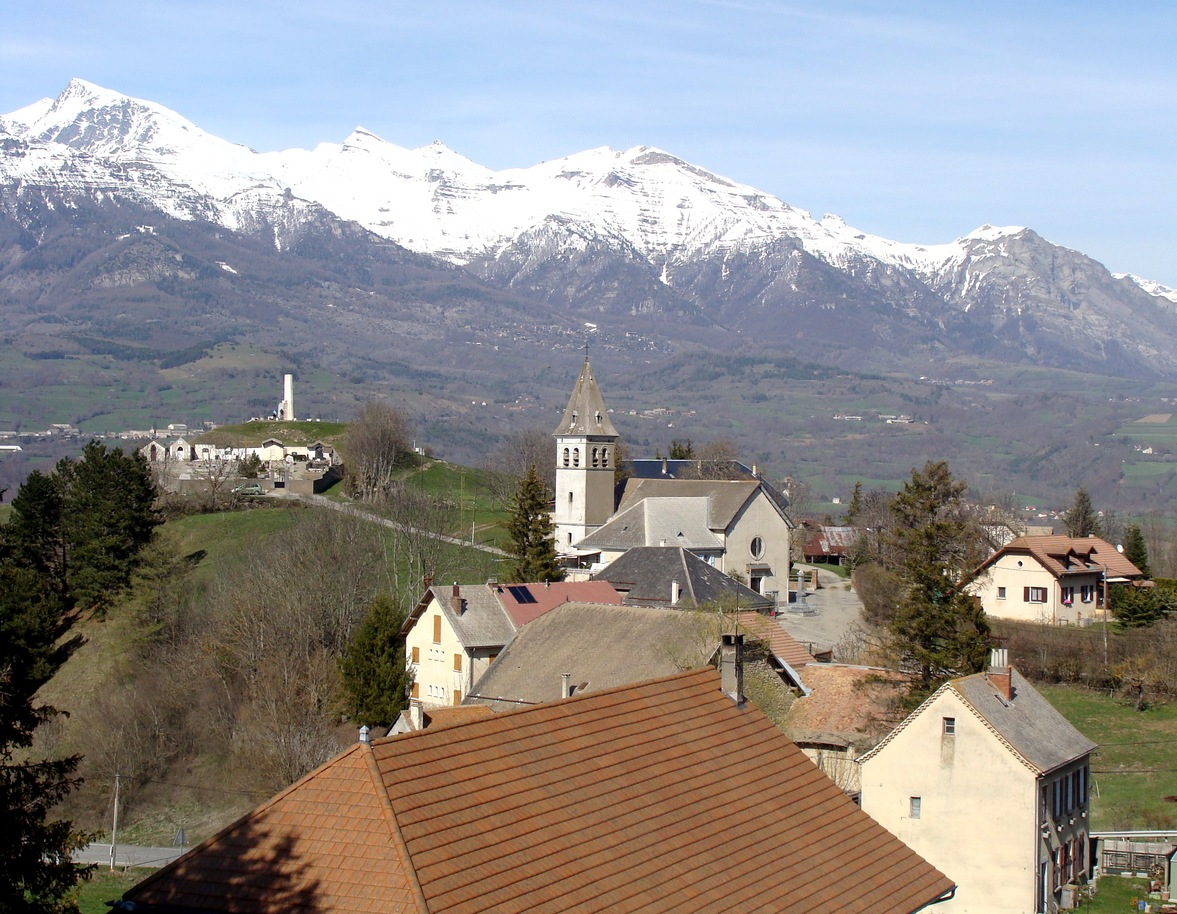
- The church and the surrounding buildings in Laye

- Coat of arms
- Location of Laye
- Location within France Location within Provence-Alpes-Côte d'Azur
- Coordinates: 44°39′43″N 6°05′06″E
- Country: France
- Region: Provence-Alpes-Côte d'Azur
- Department: Hautes-Alpes
- Arrondissement: Gap
- Canton: Saint-Bonnet-en-Champsaur

Government
  - Mayor (2026–32): Régis Maullier
- Area^{1}: 10.55 km^{2} (4.07 sq mi)
- Elevation: 1,200 m (3,900 ft)
- Highest elevation: 2,158 m (7,080 ft)
- Lowest elevation: 976 m (3,202 ft)
- Population (2023): 256
  - Density: 24.3/km^{2} (62.8/sq mi)
- Time zone: UTC+01:00 (CET)
  - Summer (DST): UTC+02:00 (CEST)
- INSEE/Postal code: 05072 /05500
- ^{1} French Land Register data, which excludes lakes, ponds, glaciers > 1 km^{2} (0.386 sq mi or 247 acres) and river estuaries.

Laye is a commune in the Hautes-Alpes department in southeastern France.

== Population ==
Historical population
Year	Pop.	±% p.a.
1968	155	—
1975	137	−1.75%
1982	163	+2.51%
1990	192	+2.07%
1999	212	+1.11%
2007	224	+0.69%
2012	245	+1.81%
2017	234	−0.91%
2023	256	+1.51%
Source: INSEE

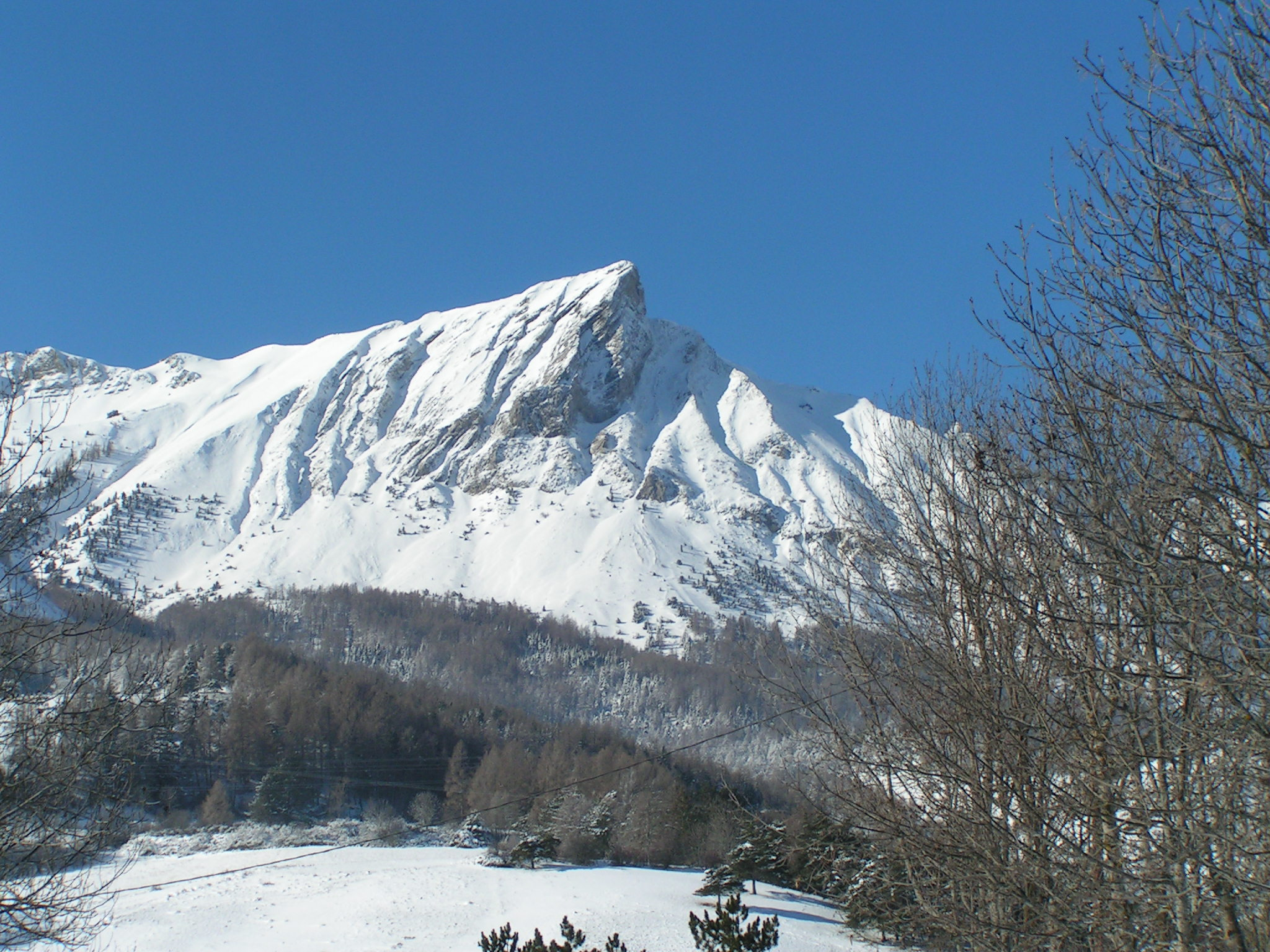
Pic de l'Aiguille

== See also ==
- Communes of the Hautes-Alpes department
