= Canton of Gap-Sud-Ouest =

Coordinates: 44°33′34″N 6°04′43″E

Gap-Sud-Ouest
- Former canton
- Interactive map of Gap-Sud-Ouest
- Country: France
- Region: Provence-Alpes-Côte d'Azur
- Department: Hautes-Alpes
- No. of communes: {{{nbcomm}}}
- Disbanded: 2015
- Population (2012): 10,096

The canton of Gap-Sud-Ouest is a former administrative division in southeastern France. It was disbanded following the French canton reorganisation which came into effect in March 2015. It had 10,096 inhabitants (2012). The canton comprised part of the commune of Gap.

== Demographics ==
Historical population
Year	Pop.	±%
1990	8,233	—
1999	9,350	+13.6%
2012	10,096	+8.0%

== See also ==
- Cantons of the Hautes-Alpes department
