= Chabottes =

Administrative division of Provence-Alpes-Côte d'Azur, France

- Commune
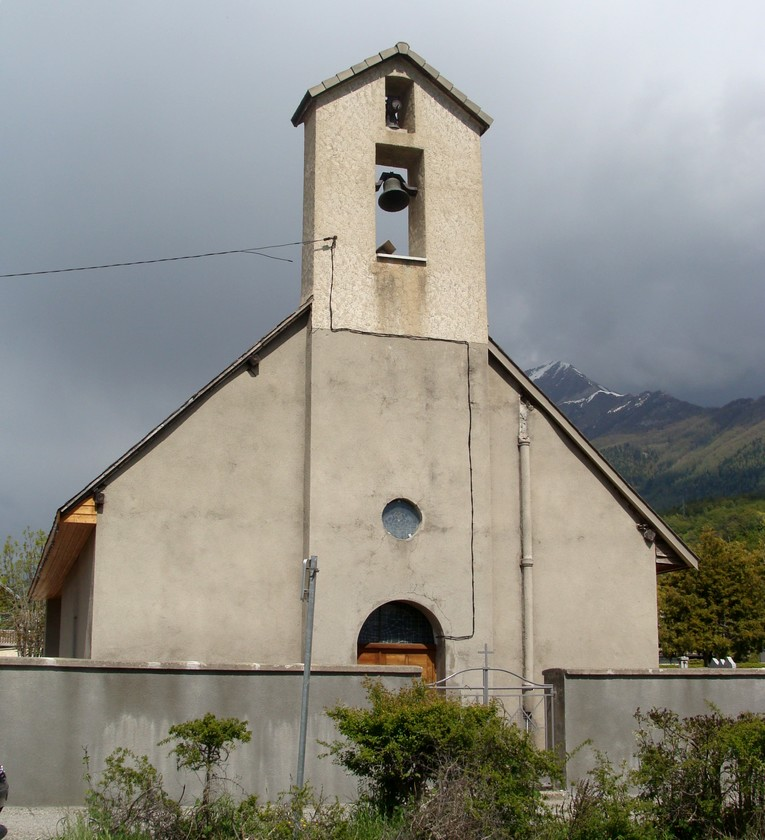
- The chapel in Chabottes

- Coat of arms
- Location of Chabottes
- Location within France Location within Provence-Alpes-Côte d'Azur
- Coordinates: 44°38′38″N 6°10′18″E
- Country: France
- Region: Provence-Alpes-Côte d'Azur
- Department: Hautes-Alpes
- Arrondissement: Gap
- Canton: Saint-Bonnet-en-Champsaur
- Intercommunality: Champsaur-Valgaudemar

Government
  - Mayor (2026–32): Elsie Nicolas
- Area^{1}: 9.96 km^{2} (3.85 sq mi)
- Elevation: 1,080 m (3,540 ft)
- Highest elevation: 1,347 m (4,419 ft)
- Lowest elevation: 1,028 m (3,373 ft)
- Population (2023): 964
  - Density: 96.8/km^{2} (251/sq mi)
- Time zone: UTC+01:00 (CET)
  - Summer (DST): UTC+02:00 (CEST)
- INSEE/Postal code: 05029 /05260
- ^{1} French Land Register data, which excludes lakes, ponds, glaciers > 1 km^{2} (0.386 sq mi or 247 acres) and river estuaries.

Chabottes (French pronunciation: [ʃabɔt]; Occitan: Chabòtas) is a commune in the Hautes-Alpes department in southeastern France.

== Population ==
Historical population
Year	Pop.	±% p.a.
1968	430	—
1975	461	+1.00%
1982	453	−0.25%
1990	518	+1.69%
1999	610	+1.83%
2007	746	+2.55%
2012	785	+1.02%
2017	825	+1.00%
2023	964	+2.63%
Source: INSEE

== See also ==
- Communes of the Hautes-Alpes department
