= Buissard =

- Commune
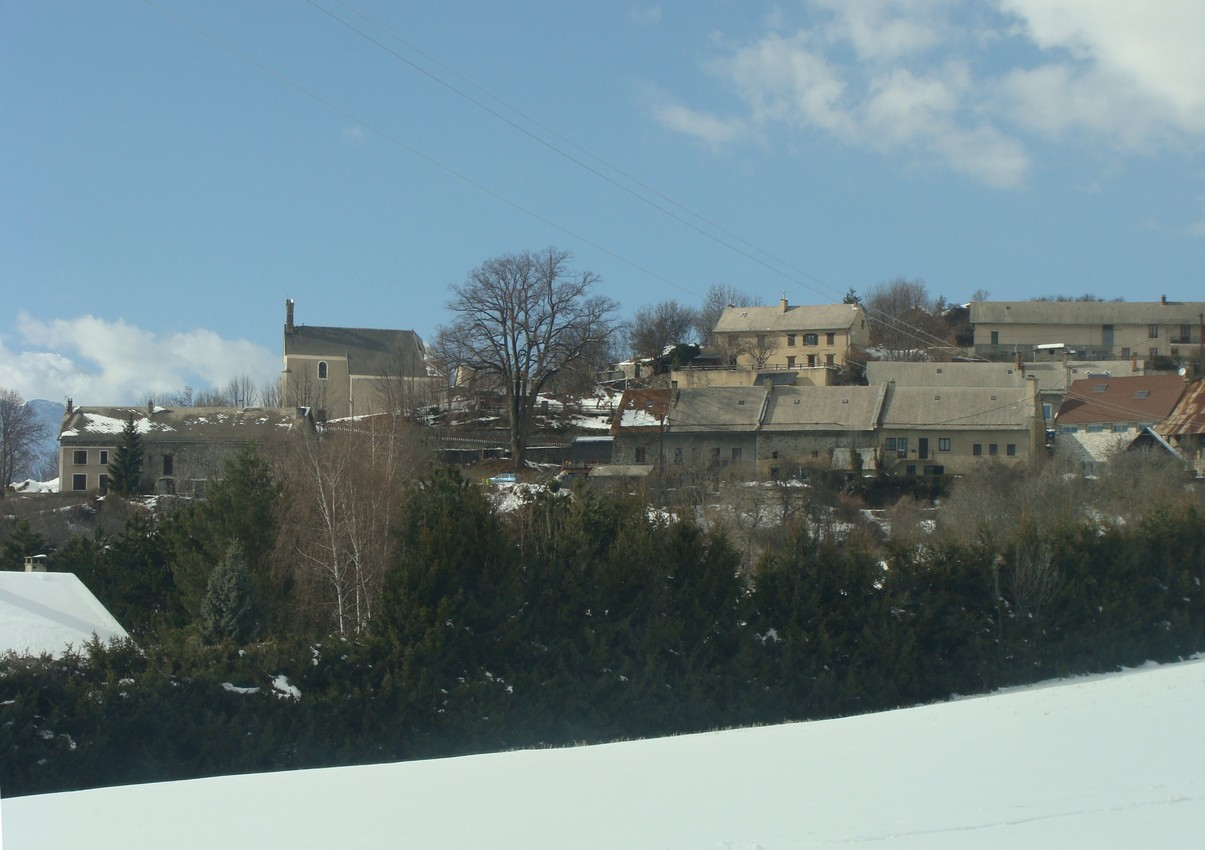
- The hamlet of Rissents, within Buissard

- Coat of arms
- Location of Buissard
- Location within France Location within Provence-Alpes-Côte d'Azur
- Coordinates: 44°39′27″N 6°08′45″E
- Country: France
- Region: Provence-Alpes-Côte d'Azur
- Department: Hautes-Alpes
- Arrondissement: Gap
- Canton: Saint-Bonnet-en-Champsaur

Government
  - Mayor (2026–32): Matthieu Pellegrin
- Area^{1}: 2.92 km^{2} (1.13 sq mi)
- Elevation: 1,240 m (4,070 ft)
- Highest elevation: 1,340 m (4,400 ft)
- Lowest elevation: 1,026 m (3,366 ft)
- Population (2023): 187
  - Density: 64.0/km^{2} (166/sq mi)
- Time zone: UTC+01:00 (CET)
  - Summer (DST): UTC+02:00 (CEST)
- INSEE/Postal code: 05025 /05500
- ^{1} French Land Register data, which excludes lakes, ponds, glaciers > 1 km^{2} (0.386 sq mi or 247 acres) and river estuaries.

Buissard (French pronunciation: [bɥisaʁ]; Occitan: Boissard) is a commune in the Hautes-Alpes department in southeastern France.

== Population ==
Historical population
Year	Pop.	±% p.a.
1968	102	—
1975	91	−1.62%
1982	111	+2.88%
1990	100	−1.30%
1999	100	+0.00%
2007	164	+6.38%
2012	186	+2.55%
2017	208	+2.26%
2023	187	−1.76%
Source: INSEE

== See also ==
- Communes of the Hautes-Alpes department
