= Canton of Gap-Sud-Est =

Coordinates: 44°33′34″N 6°04′43″E

Gap-Sud-Est
- Former canton
- Interactive map of Gap-Sud-Est
- Country: France
- Region: Provence-Alpes-Côte d'Azur
- Department: Hautes-Alpes
- No. of communes: {{{nbcomm}}}
- Disbanded: 2015
- Population (2012): 8,806

The canton of Gap-Sud-Est is a former administrative division in southeastern France. It was disbanded following the French canton reorganisation which came into effect in March 2015. It had 8,806 inhabitants (2012). The canton comprised part of the commune of Gap.

== Demographics ==
Historical population
Year	Pop.	±%
1990	8,622	—
1999	8,103	−6.0%
2012	8,806	+8.7%

== See also ==
- Cantons of the Hautes-Alpes department
