= Saint-Julien-en-Champsaur =

- Commune
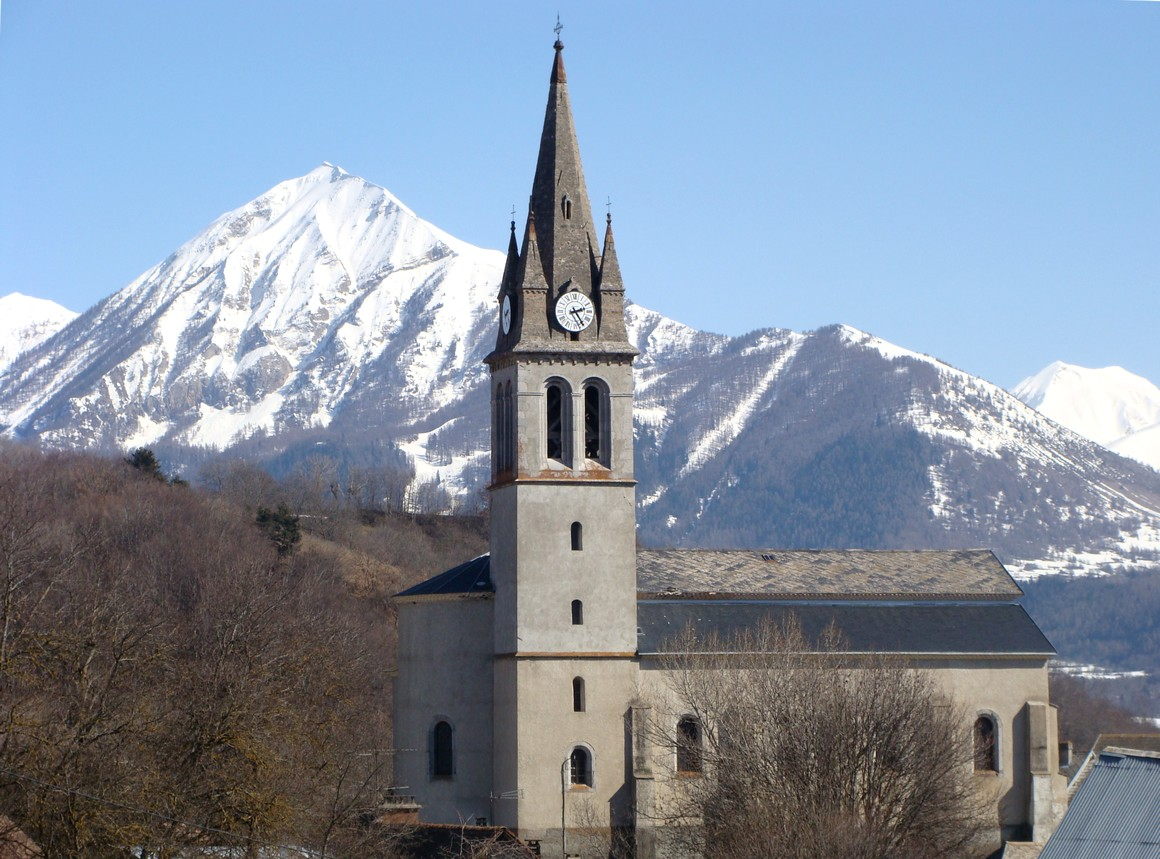
- The church of Saint-Julien-en-Champsaur

- Coat of arms
- Location of Saint-Julien-en-Champsaur
- Location within France Location within Provence-Alpes-Côte d'Azur
- Coordinates: 44°39′36″N 6°07′44″E
- Country: France
- Region: Provence-Alpes-Côte d'Azur
- Department: Hautes-Alpes
- Arrondissement: Gap
- Canton: Saint-Bonnet-en-Champsaur

Government
  - Mayor (2026–32): Denis Gosselin
- Area^{1}: 10.04 km^{2} (3.88 sq mi)
- Elevation: 1,104 m (3,622 ft)
- Highest elevation: 1,842 m (6,043 ft)
- Lowest elevation: 993 m (3,258 ft)
- Population (2023): 382
  - Density: 38.0/km^{2} (98.5/sq mi)
- Time zone: UTC+01:00 (CET)
  - Summer (DST): UTC+02:00 (CEST)
- INSEE/Postal code: 05147 /05500
- ^{1} French Land Register data, which excludes lakes, ponds, glaciers > 1 km^{2} (0.386 sq mi or 247 acres) and river estuaries.

Saint-Julien-en-Champsaur (Vivaro-Alpine: Sant Julian de Champsaur) is a commune in the Hautes-Alpes department in southeastern France.

== Population ==
Historical population
Year	Pop.	±% p.a.
1968	323	—
1975	273	−2.37%
1982	258	−0.80%
1990	252	−0.29%
1999	275	+0.98%
2007	299	+1.05%
2012	332	+2.12%
2017	360	+1.63%
2023	382	+0.99%
Source: INSEE

== Notable residents ==
=== Vivian Maier ===
Street photographer Vivian Maier lived and photographed in the vicinity of Saint-Bonnet-en-Champsaur and Saint-Julien-en-Champsaur. While many details of Maier's life remain unknown, she was the daughter of a French mother, Maria Jaussaud, and several times during her childhood she moved between the U.S. and France, living with her mother in the Alpine village of Saint-Bonnet-en-Champsaur near her mother's relations. In 1935, Vivian and her mother, Maria, were living in Saint-Julien-en-Champsaur and prior to 1940 returned to New York City.

== See also ==
- Communes of the Hautes-Alpes department
