= Entraigues, Isère =

Entraigues
- Commune
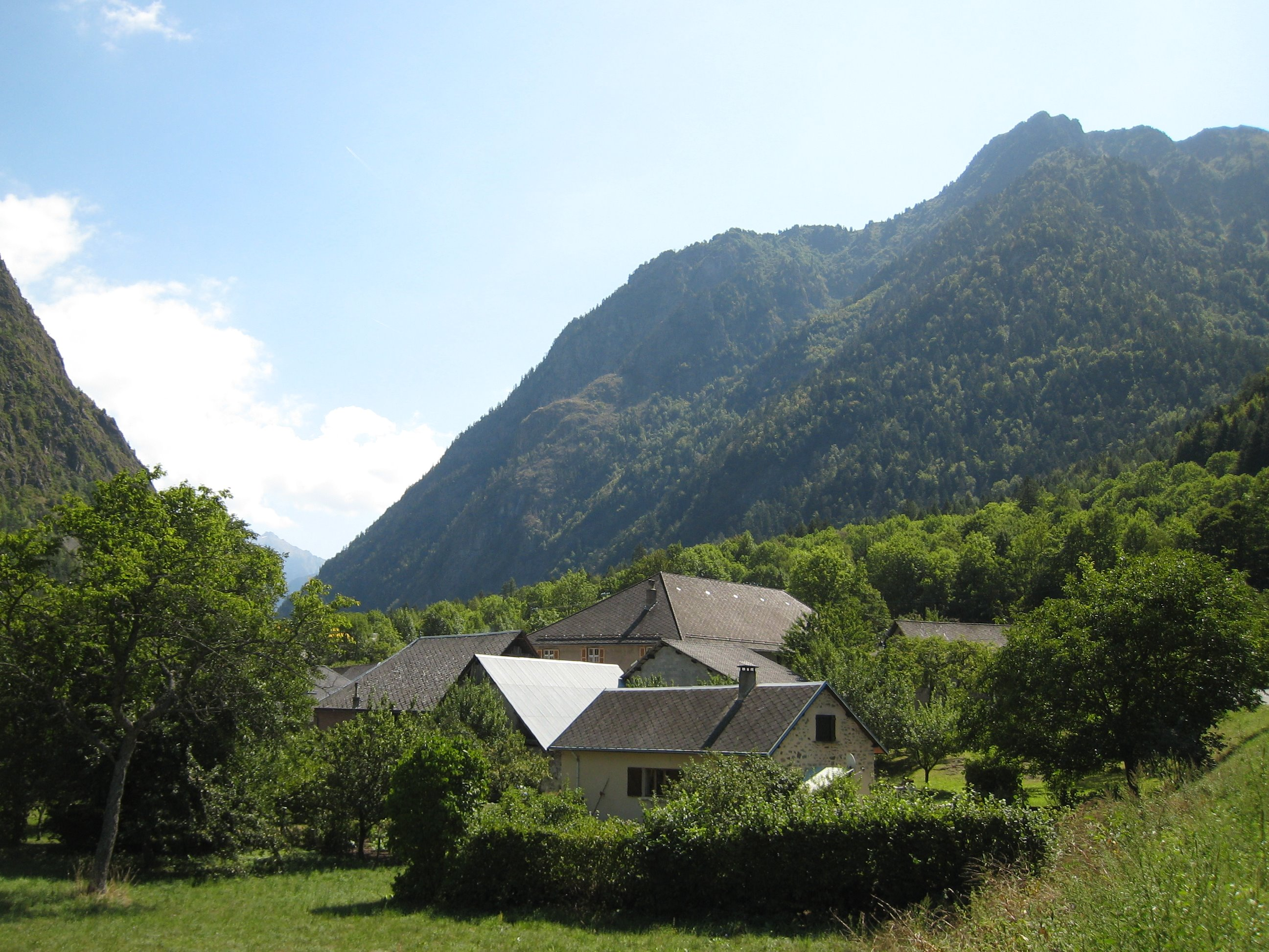
- The hamlet of Gragnolet, in Entraigues
- Location of Entraigues
- Location within France Location within Auvergne-Rhône-Alpes
- Coordinates: 44°54′09″N 5°56′55″E
- Country: France
- Region: Auvergne-Rhône-Alpes
- Department: Isère
- Arrondissement: Grenoble
- Canton: Matheysine-Trièves
- Intercommunality: Matheysine

Government
  - Mayor (2020–2026): Martine Simonnet
- Area^{1}: 21.66 km^{2} (8.36 sq mi)
- Elevation: 800 m (2,600 ft)
- Highest elevation: 2,574 m (8,445 ft)
- Lowest elevation: 744 m (2,441 ft)
- Population (2023): 225
  - Density: 10.4/km^{2} (26.9/sq mi)
- Time zone: UTC+01:00 (CET)
  - Summer (DST): UTC+02:00 (CEST)
- INSEE/Postal code: 38154 /38740
- ^{1} French Land Register data, which excludes lakes, ponds, glaciers > 1 km^{2} (0.386 sq mi or 247 acres) and river estuaries.

Entraigues (French pronunciation: [ɑ̃tʁɛɡ]) is a commune in the Isère department in southeastern France.

== Population ==
Historical population
Year	Pop.	±% p.a.
1968	244	—
1975	203	−2.59%
1982	197	−0.43%
1990	207	+0.62%
1999	229	+1.13%
2007	249	+1.05%
2012	233	−1.32%
2017	230	−0.26%
2023	225	−0.37%
Source: INSEE

== See also ==
- Communes of the Isère department
