= Saint-Léger-les-Mélèzes =

- Commune
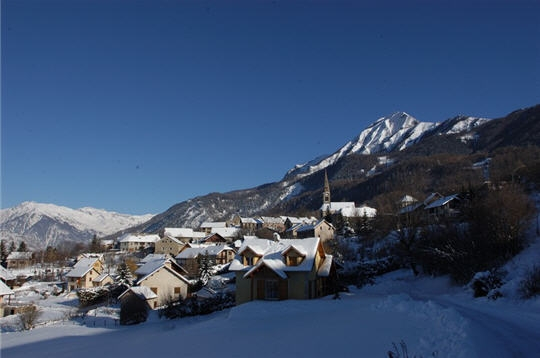
- A view of Saint-Léger-les-Mélèzes in winter

- Coat of arms
- Location of Saint-Léger-les-Mélèzes
- Location within France Location within Provence-Alpes-Côte d'Azur
- Coordinates: 44°38′40″N 6°11′56″E
- Country: France
- Region: Provence-Alpes-Côte d'Azur
- Department: Hautes-Alpes
- Arrondissement: Gap
- Canton: Saint-Bonnet-en-Champsaur

Government
  - Mayor (2026–32): Gérald Martinez
- Area^{1}: 6.76 km^{2} (2.61 sq mi)
- Elevation: 1,263 m (4,144 ft)
- Highest elevation: 2,459 m (8,068 ft)
- Lowest elevation: 1,076 m (3,530 ft)
- Population (2023): 373
  - Density: 55.2/km^{2} (143/sq mi)
- Time zone: UTC+01:00 (CET)
  - Summer (DST): UTC+02:00 (CEST)
- INSEE/Postal code: 05149 /05260
- ^{1} French Land Register data, which excludes lakes, ponds, glaciers > 1 km^{2} (0.386 sq mi or 247 acres) and river estuaries.

Saint-Léger-les-Mélèzes (French pronunciation: [sɛ̃ leʒe le melɛz]; Vivaro-Alpine: Sant Lagier) is a commune in the Hautes-Alpes department in southeastern France.

== Population ==
Historical population
Year	Pop.	±% p.a.
1968	137	—
1975	224	+7.28%
1982	190	−2.32%
1990	182	−0.54%
1999	228	+2.54%
2007	317	+4.21%
2012	332	+0.93%
2017	350	+1.06%
2023	373	+1.07%
Source: INSEE

== See also ==
- Communes of the Hautes-Alpes department
