= La Motte-en-Champsaur =

La Motte en Champsaur
- Commune
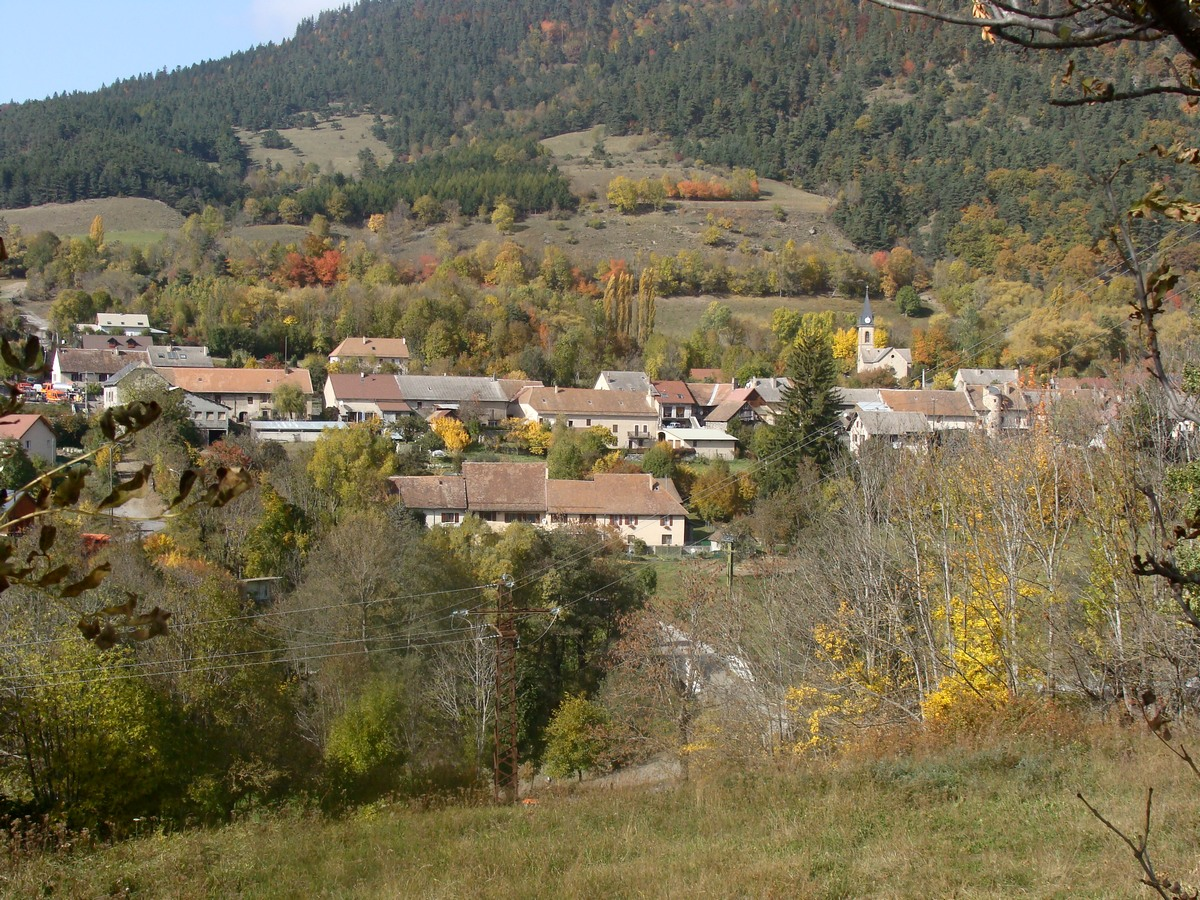
- La Motte-en-Champsaur seen from the Infournas road

- Coat of arms
- Location of La Motte en Champsaur
- Location within France Location within Provence-Alpes-Côte d'Azur
- Coordinates: 44°44′00″N 6°04′08″E
- Country: France
- Region: Provence-Alpes-Côte d'Azur
- Department: Hautes-Alpes
- Arrondissement: Gap
- Canton: Saint-Bonnet-en-Champsaur
- Intercommunality: Champsaur-Valgaudemar

Government
  - Mayor (2026–32): Bernard Gauthier
- Area^{1}: 52.8 km^{2} (20.4 sq mi)
- Elevation: 1,095 m (3,593 ft)
- Highest elevation: 3,164 m (10,381 ft)
- Lowest elevation: 1,014 m (3,327 ft)
- Population (2023): 207
  - Density: 3.92/km^{2} (10.2/sq mi)
- Time zone: UTC+01:00 (CET)
  - Summer (DST): UTC+02:00 (CEST)
- INSEE/Postal code: 05090 /05500
- ^{1} French Land Register data, which excludes lakes, ponds, glaciers > 1 km^{2} (0.386 sq mi or 247 acres) and river estuaries.

La Motte-en-Champsaur is a commune in the Hautes-Alpes department in southeastern France.

== Population ==
Historical population
Year	Pop.	±% p.a.
1968	182	—
1975	151	−2.63%
1982	167	+1.45%
1990	155	−0.93%
1999	177	+1.49%
2007	175	−0.14%
2012	227	+5.34%
2017	217	−0.90%
2023	207	−0.78%
Source: INSEE

== See also ==
- Communes of the Hautes-Alpes department
