= Ancelle =

- Commune
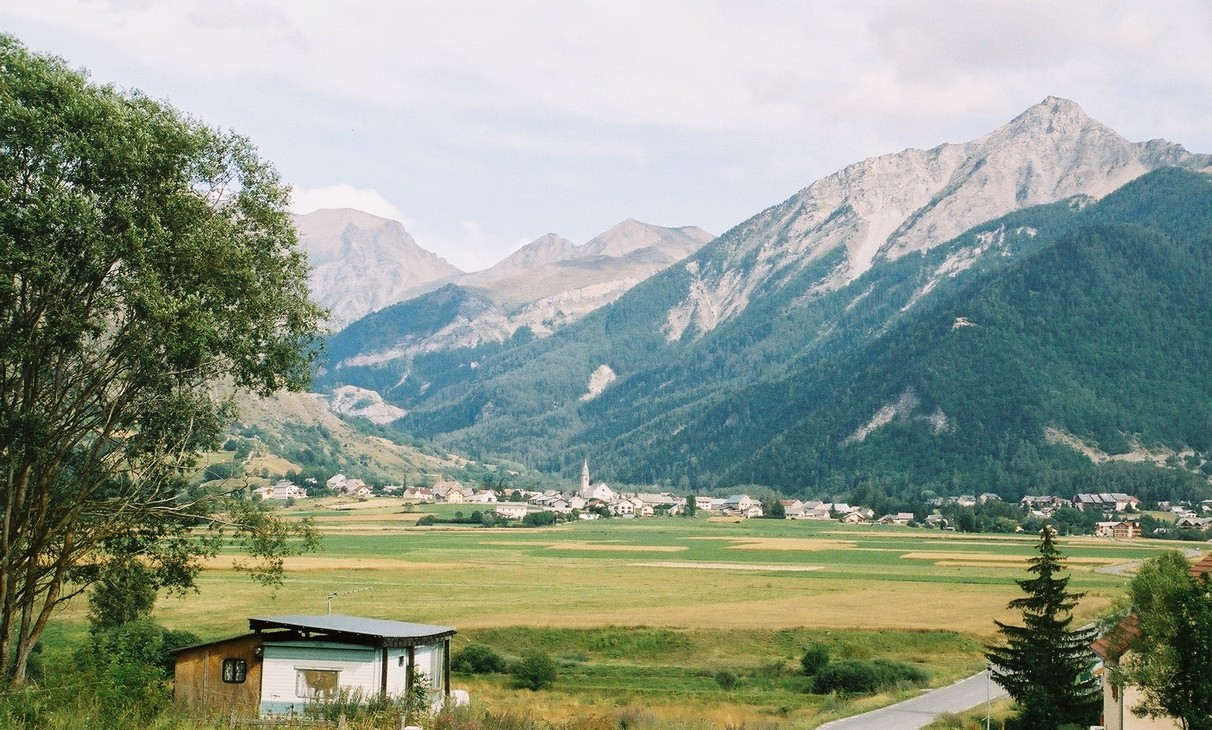
- The hamlet of St Hillaire, in Ancelle

- Coat of arms
- Location of Ancelle
- Location within France Location within Provence-Alpes-Côte d'Azur
- Coordinates: 44°37′27″N 6°12′26″E
- Country: France
- Region: Provence-Alpes-Côte d'Azur
- Department: Hautes-Alpes
- Arrondissement: Gap
- Canton: Saint-Bonnet-en-Champsaur
- Intercommunality: Champsaur-Valgaudemar

Government
  - Mayor (2026–32): Jean-Louis Clement
- Area^{1}: 50.66 km^{2} (19.56 sq mi)
- Elevation: 1,350 m (4,430 ft)
- Highest elevation: 2,779 m (9,117 ft)
- Lowest elevation: 1,160 m (3,810 ft)
- Population (2023): 1,017
  - Density: 20.08/km^{2} (51.99/sq mi)
- Time zone: UTC+01:00 (CET)
  - Summer (DST): UTC+02:00 (CEST)
- INSEE/Postal code: 05004 /05260
- Website: www.ancelle.fr
- ^{1} French Land Register data, which excludes lakes, ponds, glaciers > 1 km^{2} (0.386 sq mi or 247 acres) and river estuaries.

Ancelle (French pronunciation: [ɑ̃sɛl]; Occitan: Ancela) is a commune in the Hautes-Alpes department in southeastern France. The village is a tourist destination for both the summer and winter seasons, offering a range of sporting activities such as hiking, cross country skiing and camping. Ancelle has a small, neighbouring village called Les Taillas, located to the south of the main town centre.

== Population ==
Historical population
Year	Pop.	±% p.a.
1968	589	—
1975	641	+1.22%
1982	649	+0.18%
1990	600	−0.98%
1999	619	+0.35%
2007	808	+3.39%
2012	883	+1.79%
2017	916	+0.74%
2023	1,017	+1.76%
Source: INSEE

== See also ==
- Communes of the Hautes-Alpes department
