= Aspres-lès-Corps =

- Commune
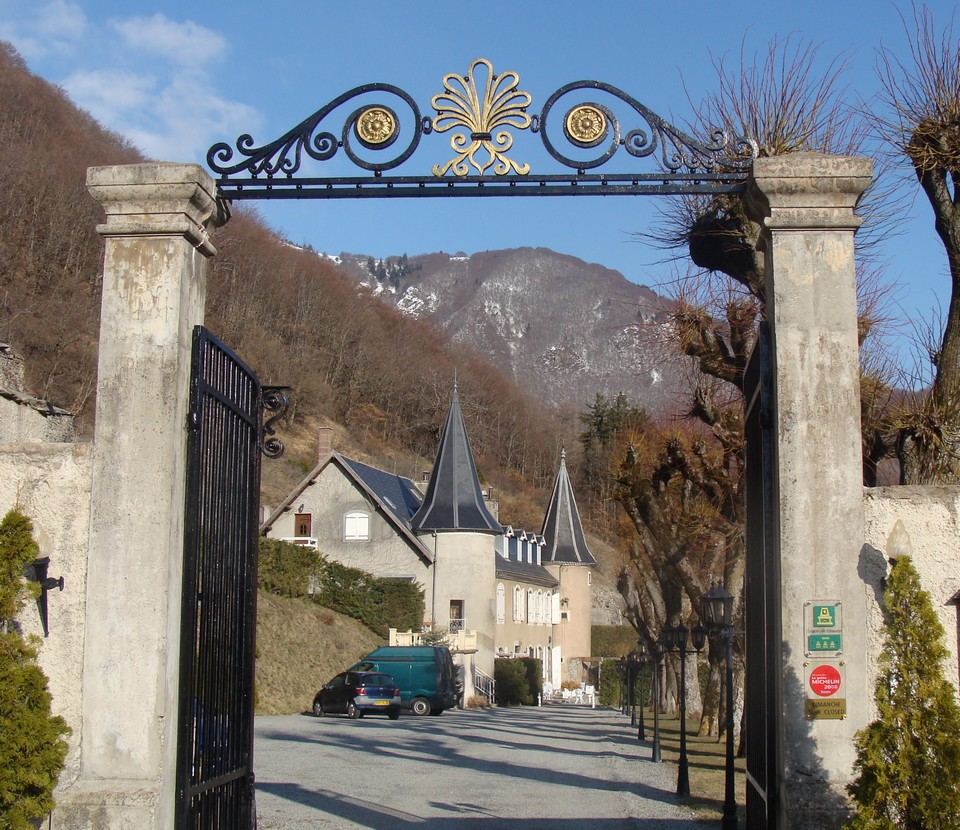
- The entrance gates of the castle of Aspres-lès-Corps

- Coat of arms
- Location of Aspres-lès-Corps
- Location within France Location within Provence-Alpes-Côte d'Azur
- Coordinates: 44°48′10″N 5°58′57″E
- Country: France
- Region: Provence-Alpes-Côte d'Azur
- Department: Hautes-Alpes
- Arrondissement: Gap
- Canton: Saint-Bonnet-en-Champsaur
- Intercommunality: Champsaur-Valgaudemar

Government
  - Mayor (2026–32): Alain Templier
- Area^{1}: 16.73 km^{2} (6.46 sq mi)
- Elevation: 900 m (3,000 ft)
- Highest elevation: 2,776 m (9,108 ft)
- Lowest elevation: 743 m (2,438 ft)
- Population (2023): 102
  - Density: 6.10/km^{2} (15.8/sq mi)
- Time zone: UTC+01:00 (CET)
  - Summer (DST): UTC+02:00 (CEST)
- INSEE/Postal code: 05009 /05800
- ^{1} French Land Register data, which excludes lakes, ponds, glaciers > 1 km^{2} (0.386 sq mi or 247 acres) and river estuaries.

Aspres-lès-Corps (French pronunciation: [aspʁ lɛ kɔʁ], literally Aspres near Corps; Occitan: Aspres los Còrps) is a commune of the Hautes-Alpes department in southeastern France.

== Population ==
Historical population
Year	Pop.	±% p.a.
1968	181	—
1975	147	−2.93%
1982	147	+0.00%
1990	119	−2.61%
1999	121	+0.19%
2007	132	+1.09%
2012	129	−0.46%
2017	104	−4.22%
2023	102	−0.32%
Source: INSEE

== See also ==
- Communes of the Hautes-Alpes department
