= Saint-Michel-de-Chaillol =

- Commune
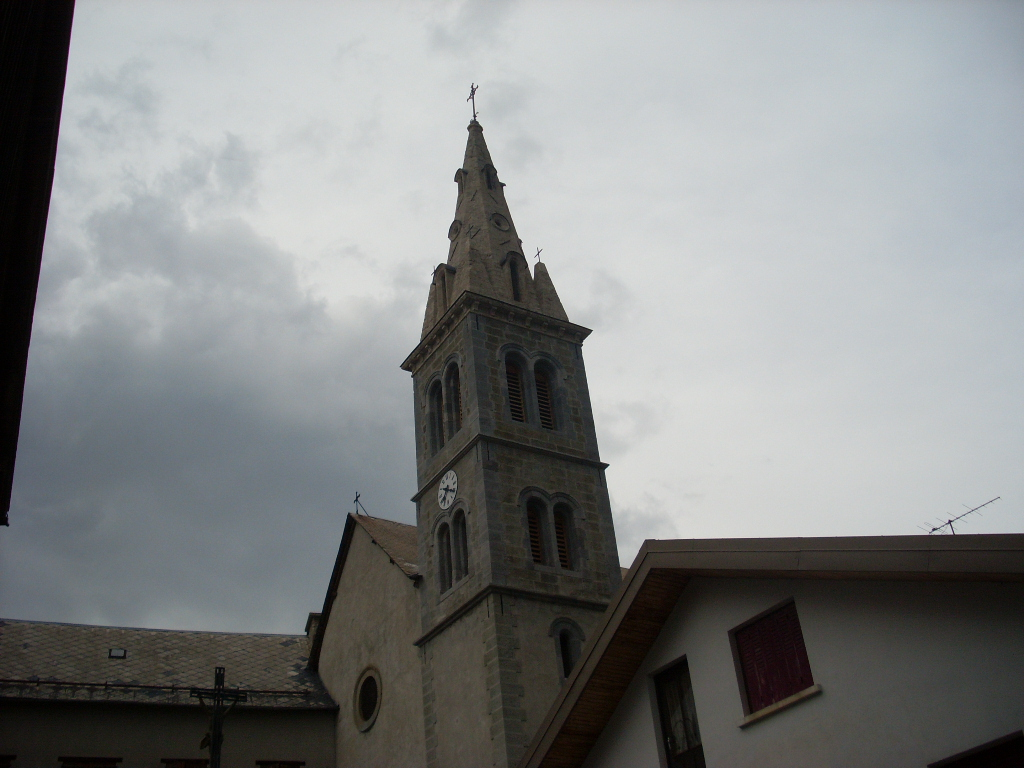
- The bell tower in Saint-Michel-de-Chaillol
- Location of Saint-Michel-de-Chaillol
- Location within France Location within Provence-Alpes-Côte d'Azur
- Coordinates: 44°40′59″N 6°10′05″E
- Country: France
- Region: Provence-Alpes-Côte d'Azur
- Department: Hautes-Alpes
- Arrondissement: Gap
- Canton: Saint-Bonnet-en-Champsaur

Government
  - Mayor (2026–32): Emmanuel Bocquet
- Area^{1}: 16.78 km^{2} (6.48 sq mi)
- Elevation: 1,458 m (4,783 ft)
- Highest elevation: 2,745 m (9,006 ft)
- Lowest elevation: 1,220 m (4,000 ft)
- Population (2023): 373
  - Density: 22.2/km^{2} (57.6/sq mi)
- Time zone: UTC+01:00 (CET)
  - Summer (DST): UTC+02:00 (CEST)
- INSEE/Postal code: 05153 /05260
- ^{1} French Land Register data, which excludes lakes, ponds, glaciers > 1 km^{2} (0.386 sq mi or 247 acres) and river estuaries.

Saint-Michel-de-Chaillol (French pronunciation: [sɛ̃ miʃɛl də ʃajɔl]; Occitan: Sant Michèl de Chalhòl), commonly known as Chaillol, is a commune in the French department of Hautes-Alpes, region of Provence-Alpes-Côte d'Azur, southeastern France.

== Population ==
Historical population
| Year | Pop. | ±% p.a. |
|---|---|---|
| 1968 | 232 | — |
| 1975 | 253 | +1.25% |
| 1982 | 316 | +3.23% |
| 1990 | 336 | +0.77% |
| 1999 | 301 | −1.21% |
| 2007 | 331 | +1.19% |
| 2012 | 321 | −0.61% |
| 2017 | 335 | +0.86% |
| 2023 | 373 | +1.81% |
Source: INSEE

== See also ==
- Communes of the Hautes-Alpes department
