= Saint-Jacques-en-Valgodemard =

- Commune
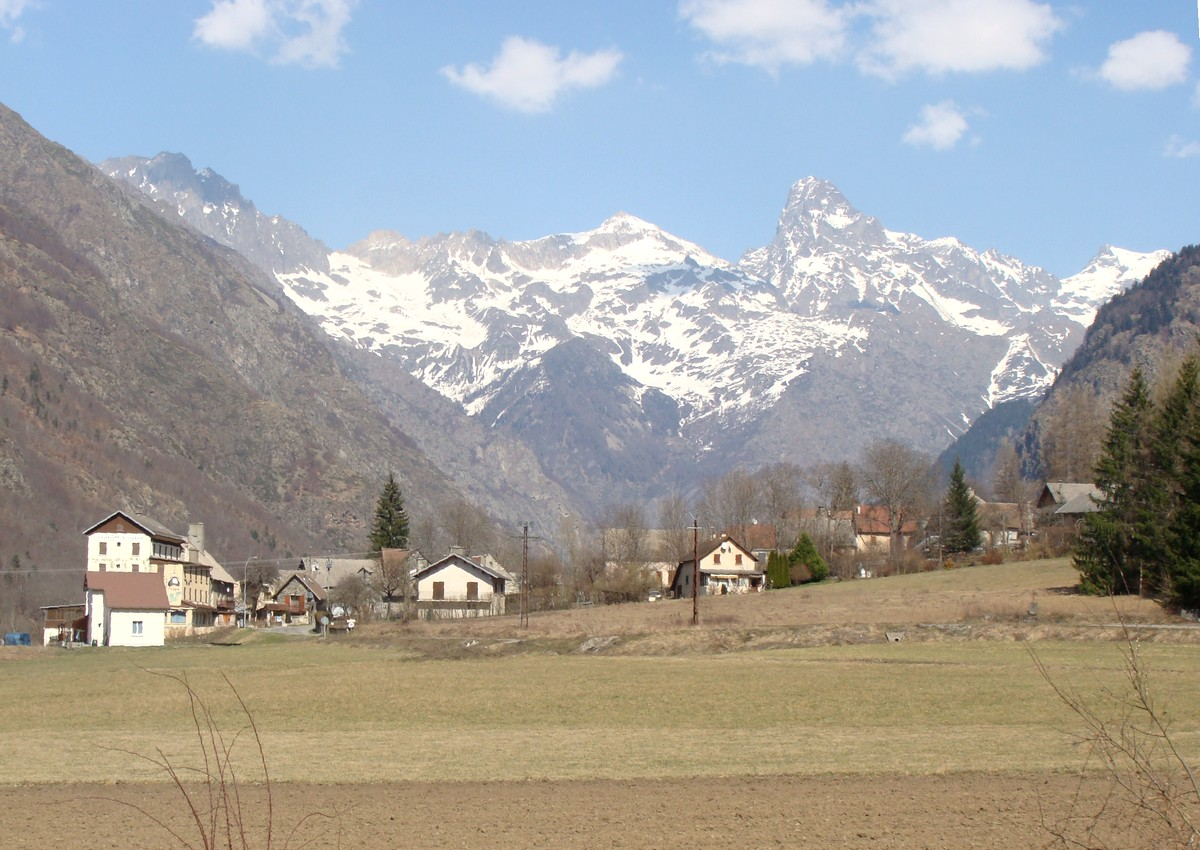
- The hamlet of Séchier, in the commune of Saint-Jacques-en-Valgodemard, with the Olan in the background.
- Location of Saint-Jacques-en-Valgodemard
- Location within France Location within Provence-Alpes-Côte d'Azur
- Coordinates: 44°46′37″N 6°02′41″E
- Country: France
- Region: Provence-Alpes-Côte d'Azur
- Department: Hautes-Alpes
- Arrondissement: Gap
- Canton: Saint-Bonnet-en-Champsaur

Government
  - Mayor (2026–32): Jean-Jacques Bicais
- Area^{1}: 15.65 km^{2} (6.04 sq mi)
- Elevation: 900 m (3,000 ft)
- Highest elevation: 2,776 m (9,108 ft)
- Lowest elevation: 820 m (2,690 ft)
- Population (2023): 113
  - Density: 7.22/km^{2} (18.7/sq mi)
- Time zone: UTC+01:00 (CET)
  - Summer (DST): UTC+02:00 (CEST)
- INSEE/Postal code: 05144 /05800
- ^{1} French Land Register data, which excludes lakes, ponds, glaciers > 1 km^{2} (0.386 sq mi or 247 acres) and river estuaries.

Saint-Jacques-en-Valgodemard (Vivaro-Alpine: Sant Jaume en Gaudemar) is a commune in the Hautes-Alpes department in southeastern France.

== Population ==
Historical population
Year	Pop.	±% p.a.
1968	172	—
1975	152	−1.75%
1982	161	+0.83%
1990	147	−1.13%
1999	152	+0.37%
2007	162	+0.80%
2012	148	−1.79%
2017	147	−0.14%
2023	113	−4.29%
Source: INSEE

== See also ==
- Communes of the Hautes-Alpes department
