= Saint-Maurice-en-Valgodemard =

- Commune
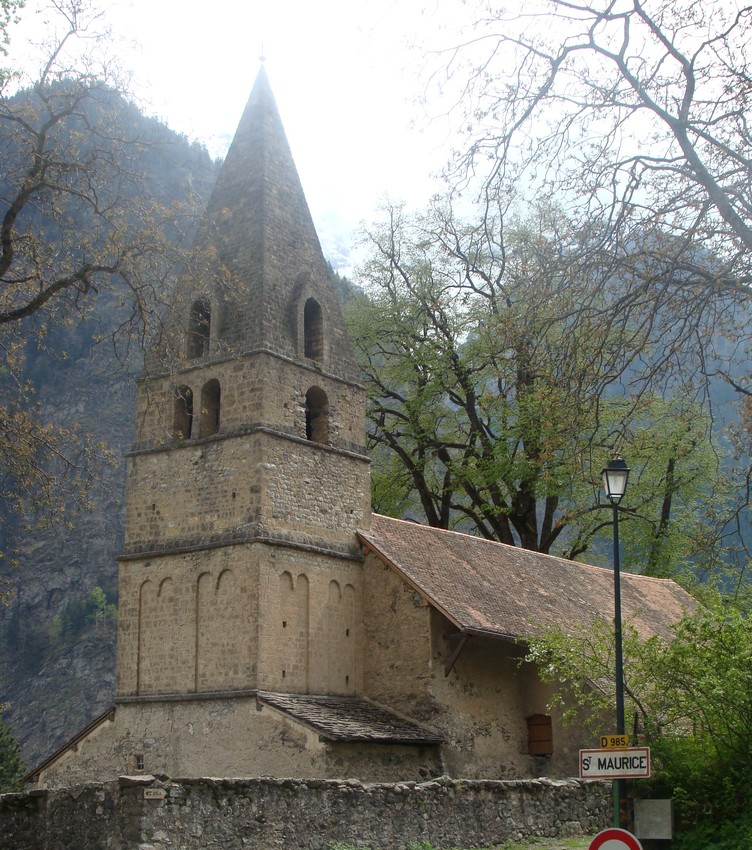
- The church of Saint-Maurice-en-Valgodemard
- Location of Saint-Maurice-en-Valgodemard
- Location within France Location within Provence-Alpes-Côte d'Azur
- Coordinates: 44°48′16″N 6°05′46″E
- Country: France
- Region: Provence-Alpes-Côte d'Azur
- Department: Hautes-Alpes
- Arrondissement: Gap
- Canton: Saint-Bonnet-en-Champsaur

Government
  - Mayor (2026–32): Sébastien Dumas
- Area^{1}: 36.37 km^{2} (14.04 sq mi)
- Elevation: 950 m (3,120 ft)
- Highest elevation: 2,824 m (9,265 ft)
- Lowest elevation: 875 m (2,871 ft)
- Population (2023): 118
  - Density: 3.24/km^{2} (8.40/sq mi)
- Time zone: UTC+01:00 (CET)
  - Summer (DST): UTC+02:00 (CEST)
- INSEE/Postal code: 05152 /05800
- ^{1} French Land Register data, which excludes lakes, ponds, glaciers > 1 km^{2} (0.386 sq mi or 247 acres) and river estuaries.

Saint-Maurice-en-Valgodemard (French pronunciation: [sɛ̃mɔʁis en valɡɔdmaʁ]; Occitan: Sant Maurici en Gaudemar [san mowˈɾisi ɛn ɡowdeˈmaɾ]) is a commune in the Hautes-Alpes department in southeastern France.

== Population ==
Historical population
Year	Pop.	±% p.a.
1968	158	—
1975	141	−1.61%
1982	117	−2.63%
1990	143	+2.54%
1999	150	+0.53%
2007	134	−1.40%
2012	144	+1.45%
2017	127	−2.48%
2023	118	−1.22%
Source: INSEE

== See also ==
- Communes of the Hautes-Alpes department
