= Villar-Loubière =

- Commune
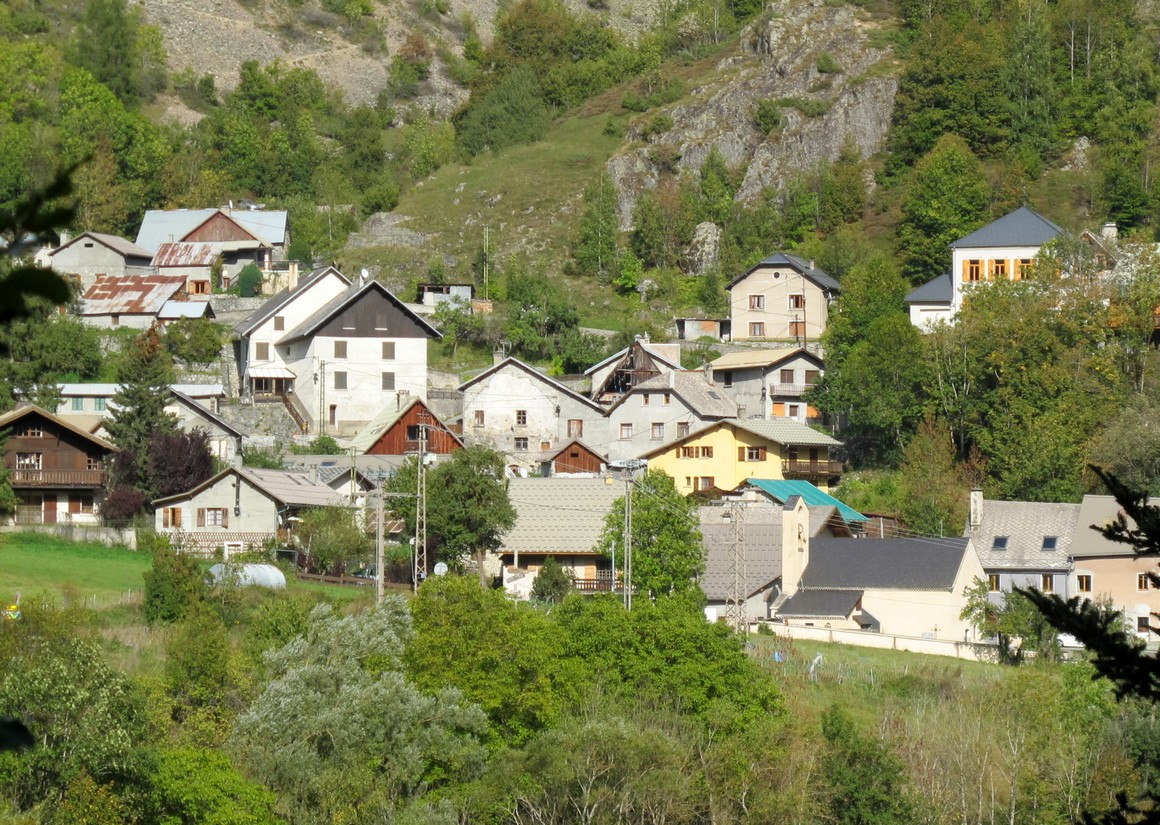
- Location of Villar-Loubière
- Location within France Location within Provence-Alpes-Côte d'Azur
- Coordinates: 44°49′36″N 6°08′47″E
- Country: France
- Region: Provence-Alpes-Côte d'Azur
- Department: Hautes-Alpes
- Arrondissement: Gap
- Canton: Saint-Bonnet-en-Champsaur

Government
  - Mayor (2026–32): Marie Bellon
- Area^{1}: 22.63 km^{2} (8.74 sq mi)
- Elevation: 1,030 m (3,380 ft)
- Highest elevation: 3,098 m (10,164 ft)
- Lowest elevation: 975 m (3,199 ft)
- Population (2023): 31
  - Density: 1.4/km^{2} (3.5/sq mi)
- Time zone: UTC+01:00 (CET)
  - Summer (DST): UTC+02:00 (CEST)
- INSEE/Postal code: 05182 /05800
- ^{1} French Land Register data, which excludes lakes, ponds, glaciers > 1 km^{2} (0.386 sq mi or 247 acres) and river estuaries.

Villar-Loubière (French pronunciation: [vilaʁ lubjɛʁ]; Occitan: Vilard Lobiera) is a commune in the Hautes-Alpes department in southeastern France.

== Geography ==
=== Climate ===
Villar-Loubière has a humid continental climate (Köppen climate classification Dfb). The average annual temperature in Villar-Loubière is 7.8 °C (46.0 °F). The average annual rainfall is 1,224.2 mm (48.20 in) with October as the wettest month. The temperatures are highest on average in July, at around 17.5 °C (63.5 °F), and lowest in January, at around −2.4 °C (27.7 °F). The highest temperature ever recorded in Villar-Loubière was 37.0 °C (98.6 °F) on 25 June 2019; the coldest temperature ever recorded was −23.5 °C (−10.3 °F) on 6 February 2012.

Climate data for Villar-Loubière, 1072m (1991–2020 averages, extremes 1986−present)
| Month | Jan | Feb | Mar | Apr | May | Jun | Jul | Aug | Sep | Oct | Nov | Dec | Year |
|---|---|---|---|---|---|---|---|---|---|---|---|---|---|
| Record high °C (°F) | 13.0 (55.4) | 20.4 (68.7) | 24.4 (75.9) | 27.9 (82.2) | 30.5 (86.9) | 37.0 (98.6) | 35.5 (95.9) | 35.5 (95.9) | 30.5 (86.9) | 26.9 (80.4) | 19.6 (67.3) | 15.0 (59.0) | 37.0 (98.6) |
| Mean daily maximum °C (°F) | 1.2 (34.2) | 4.8 (40.6) | 10.3 (50.5) | 14.0 (57.2) | 18.1 (64.6) | 22.3 (72.1) | 25.0 (77.0) | 24.7 (76.5) | 19.7 (67.5) | 14.4 (57.9) | 6.1 (43.0) | 1.6 (34.9) | 13.5 (56.3) |
| Daily mean °C (°F) | −2.2 (28.0) | −0.3 (31.5) | 4.3 (39.7) | 7.7 (45.9) | 11.7 (53.1) | 15.5 (59.9) | 17.8 (64.0) | 17.8 (64.0) | 13.7 (56.7) | 9.4 (48.9) | 2.8 (37.0) | −1.3 (29.7) | 8.1 (46.5) |
| Mean daily minimum °C (°F) | −5.5 (22.1) | −5.5 (22.1) | −1.7 (28.9) | 1.4 (34.5) | 5.4 (41.7) | 8.7 (47.7) | 10.7 (51.3) | 10.8 (51.4) | 7.7 (45.9) | 4.4 (39.9) | −0.6 (30.9) | −4.2 (24.4) | 2.6 (36.7) |
| Record low °C (°F) | −21.5 (−6.7) | −23.5 (−10.3) | −15.0 (5.0) | −8.5 (16.7) | −2.5 (27.5) | −1.5 (29.3) | 2.5 (36.5) | 1.5 (34.7) | 0.0 (32.0) | −6.0 (21.2) | −14.5 (5.9) | −18.0 (−0.4) | −23.5 (−10.3) |
| Average precipitation mm (inches) | 110.5 (4.35) | 76.2 (3.00) | 88.4 (3.48) | 94.9 (3.74) | 102.9 (4.05) | 89.0 (3.50) | 68.6 (2.70) | 79.7 (3.14) | 101.5 (4.00) | 145.8 (5.74) | 150.6 (5.93) | 132.0 (5.20) | 1,240.1 (48.83) |
| Average precipitation days (≥ 1.0 mm) | 8.9 | 6.9 | 8.0 | 8.7 | 10.7 | 9.3 | 7.2 | 7.6 | 7.5 | 9.3 | 9.7 | 9.4 | 103.2 |
Source: Meteociel

== Population ==
Historical population
| Year | Pop. | ±% p.a. |
|---|---|---|
| 1968 | 95 | — |
| 1975 | 78 | −2.78% |
| 1982 | 74 | −0.75% |
| 1990 | 59 | −2.79% |
| 1999 | 62 | +0.55% |
| 2007 | 50 | −2.65% |
| 2012 | 45 | −2.09% |
| 2017 | 41 | −1.84% |
| 2023 | 31 | −4.55% |
Source: INSEE

== See also ==
- Communes of the Hautes-Alpes department
