= Saint-Jean-Saint-Nicolas =

- Commune
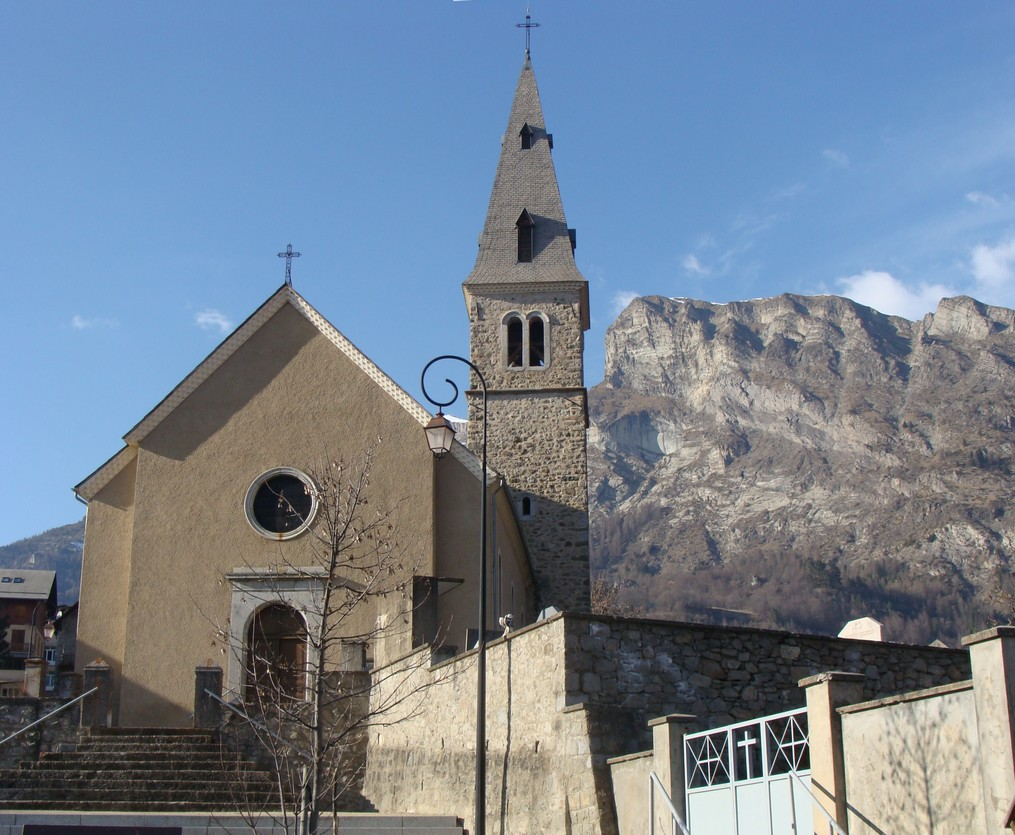
- The church of Saint-Jean

- Coat of arms
- Location of Saint-Jean-Saint-Nicolas
- Location within France Location within Provence-Alpes-Côte d'Azur
- Coordinates: 44°40′06″N 6°13′46″E
- Country: France
- Region: Provence-Alpes-Côte d'Azur
- Department: Hautes-Alpes
- Arrondissement: Gap
- Canton: Saint-Bonnet-en-Champsaur

Government
  - Mayor (2026–32): Rodolphe Papet
- Area^{1}: 37.17 km^{2} (14.35 sq mi)
- Elevation: 1,129 m (3,704 ft)
- Highest elevation: 2,614 m (8,576 ft)
- Lowest elevation: 1,077 m (3,533 ft)
- Population (2023): 1,110
  - Density: 29.9/km^{2} (77.3/sq mi)
- Time zone: UTC+01:00 (CET)
  - Summer (DST): UTC+02:00 (CEST)
- INSEE/Postal code: 05145 /05260
- ^{1} French Land Register data, which excludes lakes, ponds, glaciers > 1 km^{2} (0.386 sq mi or 247 acres) and river estuaries.

Saint-Jean-Saint-Nicolas (French pronunciation: [sɛ̃ ʒɑ̃ sɛ̃ nikɔla]; Vivaro-Alpine: Sant Joan Sant Nicolau) is a commune in the Hautes-Alpes department in southeastern France.

== Population ==
Historical population
Year	Pop.	±% p.a.
1968	695	—
1975	746	+1.02%
1982	823	+1.41%
1990	865	+0.62%
1999	781	−1.13%
2007	925	+2.14%
2012	992	+1.41%
2017	1,041	+0.97%
2023	1,110	+1.08%
Source: INSEE

== See also ==
- Communes of the Hautes-Alpes department
