= La Chapelle-en-Valgaudémar =

La Chapelle-en-Valgaudemar
- Commune
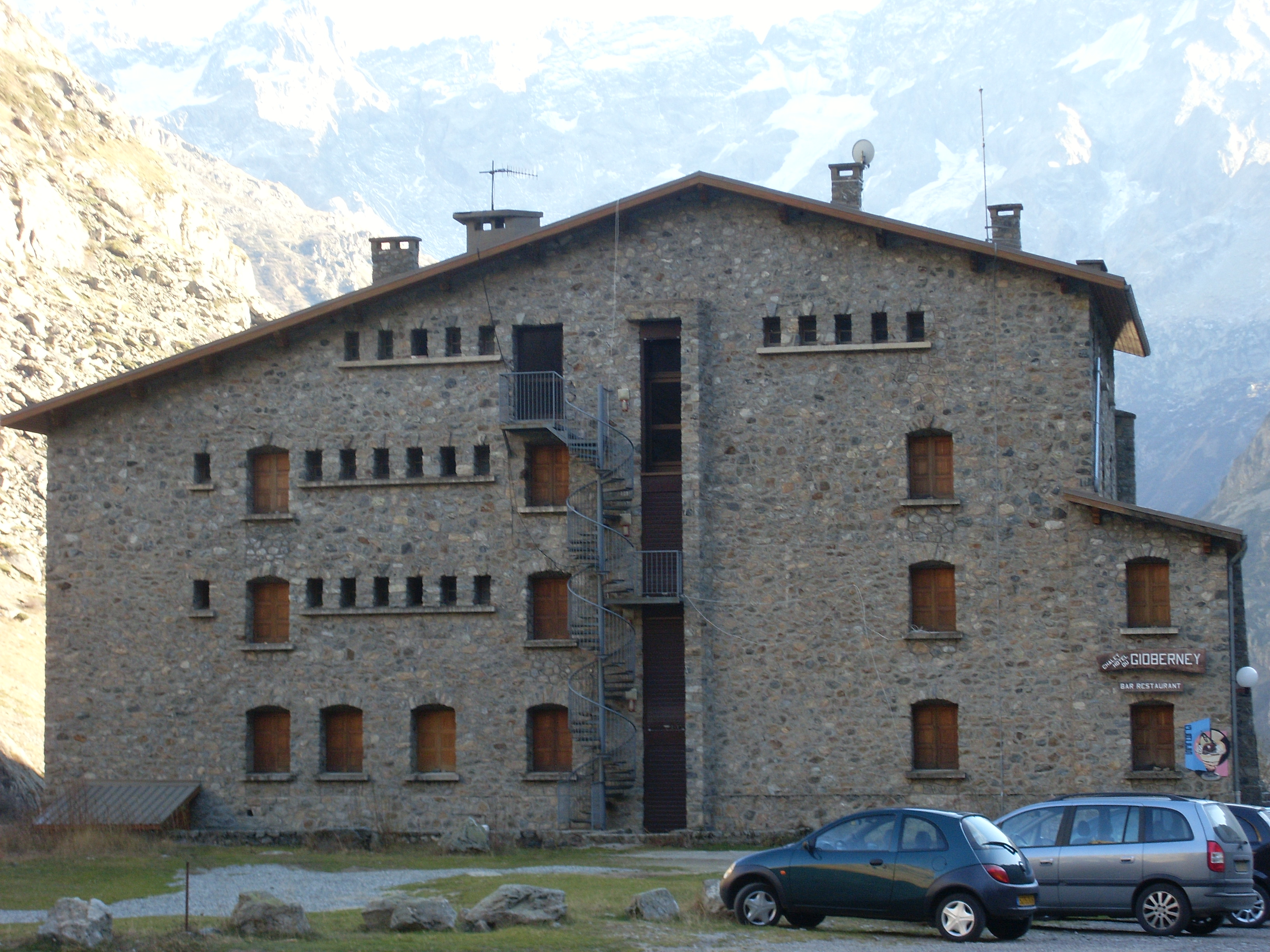
- Mountain climbers refuge at Gioberney

- Coat of arms
- Location of La Chapelle-en-Valgaudemar
- Location within France Location within Provence-Alpes-Côte d'Azur
- Coordinates: 44°49′04″N 6°11′43″E
- Country: France
- Region: Provence-Alpes-Côte d'Azur
- Department: Hautes-Alpes
- Arrondissement: Gap
- Canton: Saint-Bonnet-en-Champsaur
- Intercommunality: Champsaur-Valgaudemar

Government
  - Mayor (2026–32): Henri Perrier
- Area^{1}: 108.02 km^{2} (41.71 sq mi)
- Elevation: 1,050 m (3,440 ft)
- Highest elevation: 3,667 m (12,031 ft)
- Lowest elevation: 1,022 m (3,353 ft)
- Population (2023): 120
  - Density: 1.1/km^{2} (2.9/sq mi)
- Time zone: UTC+01:00 (CET)
  - Summer (DST): UTC+02:00 (CEST)
- INSEE/Postal code: 05064 /05800
- ^{1} French Land Register data, which excludes lakes, ponds, glaciers > 1 km^{2} (0.386 sq mi or 247 acres) and river estuaries.

La Chapelle-en-Valgaudémar (Occitan: La Capèla) is a commune in the Hautes-Alpes department in southeastern France. It was created in 1963 by the merger of two former communes: Guillaume-Peyrouse and Clémence-d'Ambel.

== Geography ==
=== Climate ===
La Chapelle-en-Valgaudémar has a humid continental climate (Köppen climate classification Dfb). The average annual temperature in La Chapelle-en-Valgaudémar is 7.2 °C (45.0 °F). The average annual rainfall is 1,301.8 mm (51.25 in) with October as the wettest month. The temperatures are highest on average in July, at around 16.3 °C (61.3 °F), and lowest in January, at around −1.0 °C (30.2 °F). The highest temperature ever recorded in La Chapelle-en-Valgaudémar was 33.2 °C (91.8 °F) on 26 June 2019; the coldest temperature ever recorded was −26.0 °C (−14.8 °F) on 3 February 1956.

Climate data for La Chapelle-en-Valgaudémar (1981–2010 averages, extremes 1951−present)
| Month | Jan | Feb | Mar | Apr | May | Jun | Jul | Aug | Sep | Oct | Nov | Dec | Year |
|---|---|---|---|---|---|---|---|---|---|---|---|---|---|
| Record high °C (°F) | 15.9 (60.6) | 18.0 (64.4) | 21.5 (70.7) | 23.9 (75.0) | 27.9 (82.2) | 33.2 (91.8) | 33.0 (91.4) | 33.0 (91.4) | 29.0 (84.2) | 25.2 (77.4) | 19.0 (66.2) | 16.0 (60.8) | 33.2 (91.8) |
| Mean daily maximum °C (°F) | 3.5 (38.3) | 4.6 (40.3) | 8.3 (46.9) | 11.6 (52.9) | 16.1 (61.0) | 19.6 (67.3) | 22.8 (73.0) | 22.2 (72.0) | 17.6 (63.7) | 13.1 (55.6) | 6.8 (44.2) | 3.7 (38.7) | 12.5 (54.5) |
| Daily mean °C (°F) | −1.0 (30.2) | −0.5 (31.1) | 2.8 (37.0) | 6.0 (42.8) | 10.3 (50.5) | 13.5 (56.3) | 16.3 (61.3) | 16.0 (60.8) | 12.2 (54.0) | 8.3 (46.9) | 2.8 (37.0) | −0.3 (31.5) | 7.2 (45.0) |
| Mean daily minimum °C (°F) | −5.5 (22.1) | −5.6 (21.9) | −2.7 (27.1) | −0.4 (31.3) | 4.5 (40.1) | 7.3 (45.1) | 9.8 (49.6) | 9.7 (49.5) | 6.8 (44.2) | 3.5 (38.3) | −1.1 (30.0) | −4.3 (24.3) | 1.9 (35.4) |
| Record low °C (°F) | −24.0 (−11.2) | −26.0 (−14.8) | −22.0 (−7.6) | −13.0 (8.6) | −7.0 (19.4) | −2.0 (28.4) | 1.0 (33.8) | 0.5 (32.9) | −2.2 (28.0) | −8.5 (16.7) | −15.0 (5.0) | −20.6 (−5.1) | −26.0 (−14.8) |
| Average precipitation mm (inches) | 104.1 (4.10) | 83.6 (3.29) | 88.0 (3.46) | 116.5 (4.59) | 111.7 (4.40) | 100.6 (3.96) | 72.7 (2.86) | 82.5 (3.25) | 124.0 (4.88) | 161.5 (6.36) | 130.6 (5.14) | 126.0 (4.96) | 1,301.8 (51.25) |
| Average precipitation days (≥ 1.0 mm) | 9.1 | 7.2 | 8.8 | 10.4 | 12.1 | 9.7 | 7.3 | 7.8 | 8.3 | 10.4 | 9.0 | 9.2 | 109.2 |
Source: Meteociel

== Population ==
Historical population
| Year | Pop. | ±% p.a. |
|---|---|---|
| 1968 | 204 | — |
| 1975 | 181 | −1.69% |
| 1982 | 184 | +0.24% |
| 1990 | 135 | −3.80% |
| 1999 | 129 | −0.50% |
| 2007 | 121 | −0.80% |
| 2012 | 111 | −1.71% |
| 2017 | 104 | −1.29% |
| 2023 | 120 | +2.41% |
Source: INSEE

== See also ==
- Communes of the Hautes-Alpes department
