= Canton of Saint-Bonnet-en-Champsaur =

Coordinates: 44°40′55″N 6°04′35″E

Saint-Bonnet-en-Champsaur
- Canton
- Country: France
- Region: Provence-Alpes-Côte d'Azur
- Department: Hautes-Alpes
- No. of communes: {{{nbcomm}}}
- Area: 745.91 km^{2} (288.00 sq mi)
- Population (2023): 11,683
  - Density: 15.663/km^{2} (40.566/sq mi)
- INSEE code: 05 12

The canton of Saint-Bonnet-en-Champsaur is an administrative division in southeastern France. At the French canton reorganisation which came into effect in March 2015, the canton was expanded from 16 to 27 communes (3 of which merged into the new commune Aubessagne):

- Ancelle
- Aspres-lès-Corps
- Aubessagne
- Buissard
- Chabottes
- Champoléon
- La Chapelle-en-Valgaudémar
- La Fare-en-Champsaur
- Forest-Saint-Julien
- Le Glaizil
- Laye
- La Motte-en-Champsaur
- Le Noyer
- Orcières
- Poligny
- Saint-Bonnet-en-Champsaur
- Saint-Firmin
- Saint-Jacques-en-Valgodemard
- Saint-Jean-Saint-Nicolas
- Saint-Julien-en-Champsaur
- Saint-Laurent-du-Cros
- Saint-Léger-les-Mélèzes
- Saint-Maurice-en-Valgodemard
- Saint-Michel-de-Chaillol
- Villar-Loubière

== Demographics ==
Historical population
| Year | Pop. | ±% p.a. |
|---|---|---|
| 2013 | 11,058 | — |
| 2018 | 11,169 | +0.20% |
Source: INSEE

== See also ==
- Cantons of the Hautes-Alpes department
- Communes of France
