= Champoléon =

- Commune
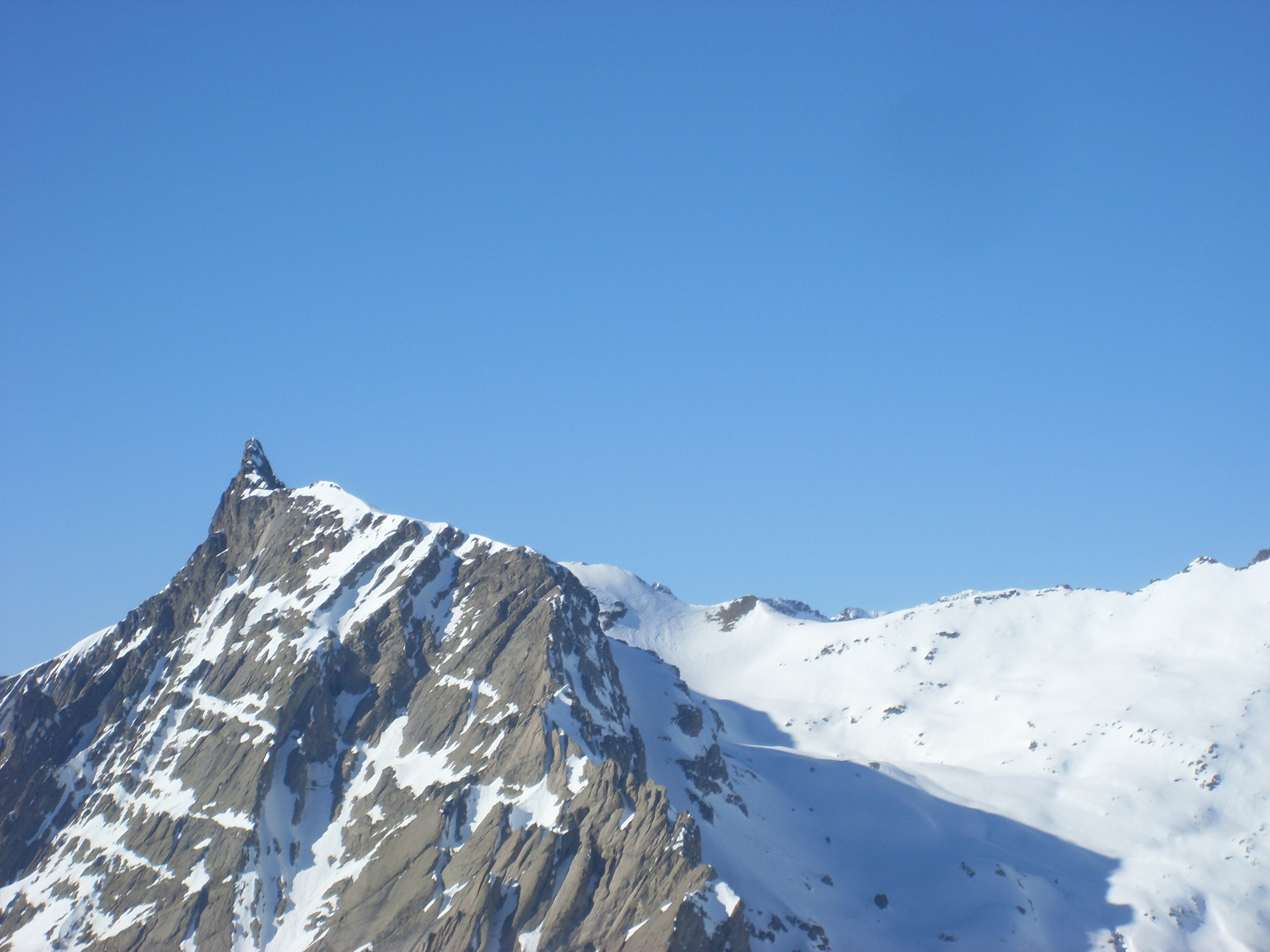
- Aiguille de Cédera

- Coat of arms
- Location of Champoléon
- Location within France Location within Provence-Alpes-Côte d'Azur
- Coordinates: 44°43′17″N 6°15′42″E
- Country: France
- Region: Provence-Alpes-Côte d'Azur
- Department: Hautes-Alpes
- Arrondissement: Gap
- Canton: Saint-Bonnet-en-Champsaur

Government
  - Mayor (2026–32): Jean-Pierre Colle
- Area^{1}: 98.54 km^{2} (38.05 sq mi)
- Elevation: 1,261 m (4,137 ft)
- Highest elevation: 3,439 m (11,283 ft)
- Lowest elevation: 1,173 m (3,848 ft)
- Population (2023): 144
  - Density: 1.46/km^{2} (3.78/sq mi)
- Time zone: UTC+01:00 (CET)
  - Summer (DST): UTC+02:00 (CEST)
- INSEE/Postal code: 05032 /05260
- ^{1} French Land Register data, which excludes lakes, ponds, glaciers > 1 km^{2} (0.386 sq mi or 247 acres) and river estuaries.

Champoléon (French pronunciation: [ʃɑ̃pɔleɔ̃]) is a commune in the Hautes-Alpes department in southeastern France.

== Population ==
Historical population
Year	Pop.	±% p.a.
1968	135	—
1975	110	−2.88%
1982	116	+0.76%
1990	102	−1.59%
1999	113	+1.14%
2007	124	+1.17%
2012	136	+1.86%
2017	140	+0.58%
2023	144	+0.47%
Source: INSEE

== See also ==
- Communes of the Hautes-Alpes department
