= Canton of La Bâtie-Neuve =

Coordinates: 44°34′03″N 6°11′47″E

La Bâtie-Neuve
- Former canton
- Interactive map of La Bâtie-Neuve
- Country: France
- Region: Provence-Alpes-Côte d'Azur
- Department: Hautes-Alpes
- No. of communes: {{{nbcomm}}}
- Disbanded: 2015
- Area: 116.56 km^{2} (45.00 sq mi)
- Population (2012): 4,963
  - Density: 42.58/km^{2} (110.3/sq mi)

The canton of La Bâtie-Neuve was an administrative division in southeastern France. It was disbanded following the French canton reorganisation which came into effect in March 2015. It had 4,963 inhabitants (2012).

The canton comprised the following communes:

- Avançon
- La Bâtie-Neuve
- La Bâtie-Vieille
- Montgardin
- Rambaud
- La Rochette
- Saint-Étienne-le-Laus
- Valserres

== Demographics ==
Historical population Canton of La Bâtie-Neuve
Year	1962	1968	1975	1982	1990	1999
Pop.	1,809	1,879	1,949	2,449	3,150	3,704
±%	—	+3.9%	+3.7%	+25.7%	+28.6%	+17.6%
From the year 1962 on: No double counting – residents of multiple communes (e.g. students and military personnel) are counted only once. Source: INSEE

== See also ==
- Cantons of the Hautes-Alpes department
