= Canton of Barcillonnette =

Coordinates: 44°26′10″N 5°55′11″E

Barcillonnette
- Former canton
- Interactive map of Barcillonnette
- Country: France
- Region: Provence-Alpes-Côte d'Azur
- Department: Hautes-Alpes
- No. of communes: {{{nbcomm}}}
- Disbanded: 2015
- Area: 58.24 km^{2} (22.49 sq mi)
- Population (2012): 390
  - Density: 6.7/km^{2} (17/sq mi)

The canton of Barcillonnette is a former administrative division in southeastern France. In 1999, with a registered population of 270, it had a lower population than any other French canton. It was disbanded following the French canton reorganisation which came into effect in March 2015. It consisted of 3 communes, which joined the canton of Tallard in 2015. It had 390 inhabitants in 2012.

The canton comprised the following communes:

- Barcillonnette
- Esparron
- Vitrolles

== Demographics ==
Historical population Canton of Barcillonnette
Year	1962	1968	1975	1982	1990	1999
Pop.	304	318	277	250	264	270
±%	—	+4.6%	−12.9%	−9.7%	+5.6%	+2.3%
From the year 1962 on: No double counting – residents of multiple communes (e.g. students and military personnel) are counted only once. Source: INSEE

== See also ==
- Cantons of the Hautes-Alpes department
