= Jean-Michel Arnaud =

French politician (born 1966)

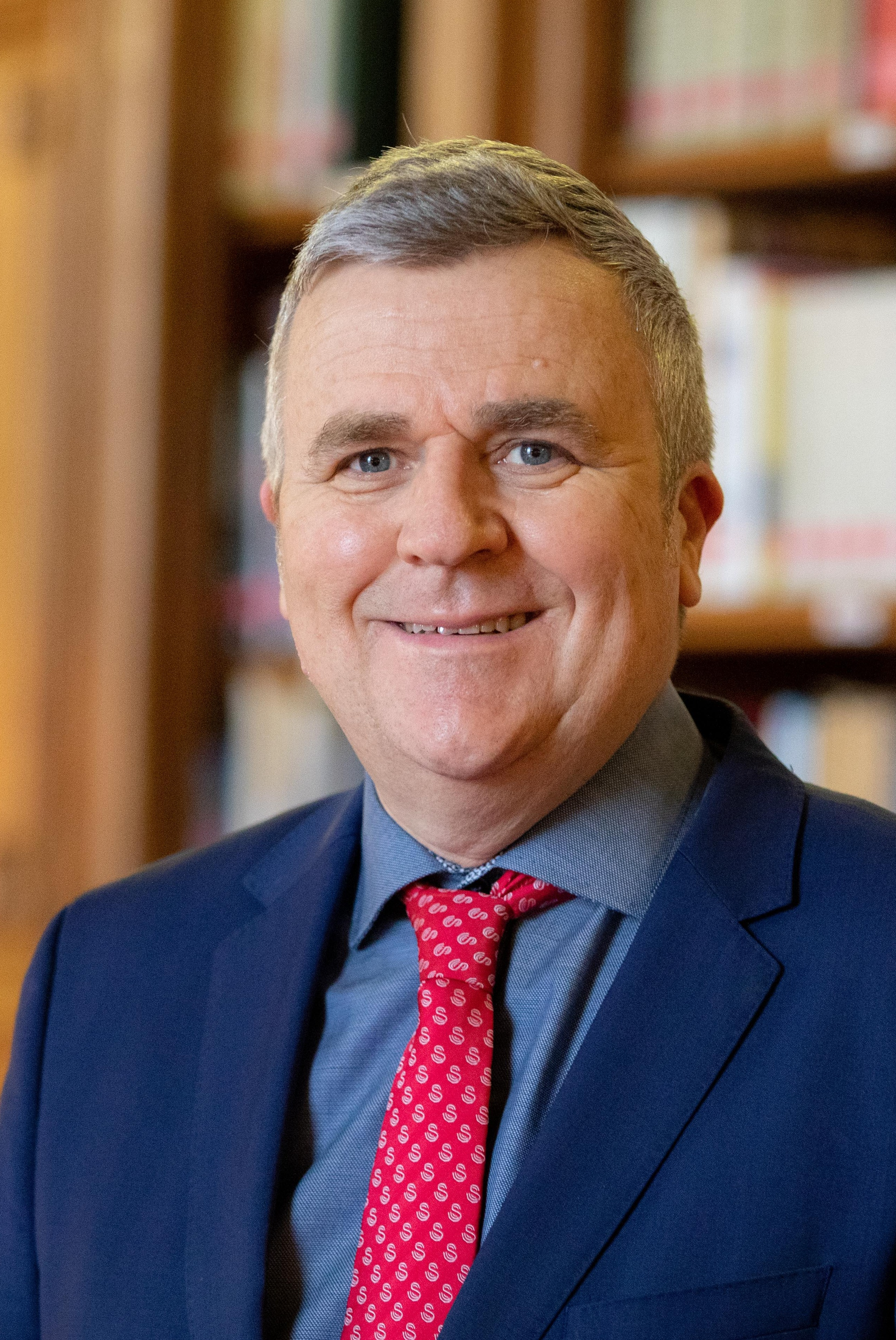
- Arnaud in 2021

Senator for Hautes-Alpes
- Incumbent
- Assumed office 1 October 2020
- Preceded by: Patricia Morhet-Richaud

Mayor of Tallard
- In office 12 March 2001 – 2 November 2020
- Preceded by: Michel Favre
- Succeeded by: Daniel Borel

Personal details
- Born: 28 April 1966 (age 60) Gap, France
- Party: The Centrists
- Other political affiliations: Union for French Democracy (1998–2007); Democratic Movement (2007–2008); Union for a Popular Movement (2008–2015); The Republicans (2015–2017)
- Occupation: Farmer

Jean-Michel Arnaud (French pronunciation: [ʒɑ̃miʃɛl aʁno]; born 28 April 1966) is a French farmer and politician who has represented Hautes-Alpes in the Senate since 2020. A member of The Centrists (LC), he sits with the Centrist Union group. From 2001 to 2020, Arnaud served as mayor of Tallard.

== Career ==
In the 2020 election, running under the miscellaneous centre (DVC) banner, Arnaud defeated outgoing Senator Patricia Morhet-Richaud of The Republicans (LR) by nine votes to represent Hautes-Alpes in the Senate. He had previously run in 2014, placing second in the first round behind Jean-Yves Dusserre before withdrawing ahead of the second round.

Locally, Arnaud previously served as the member of the General Council of Hautes-Alpes for the canton of Tallard (1998–2015) and held the mayorship of Tallard, a village south of Gap (2001–2020), as well as the presidency of the Communauté de communes de Tallard-Barcillonnette (2014–2016), before the Communauté d'agglomération Gap-Tallard-Durance was established in 2017 as its successor.
