= Canton of Gap-Campagne =

Coordinates: 44°33′34″N 6°04′43″E

Gap-Campagne
- Former canton
- Interactive map of Gap-Campagne
- Country: France
- Region: Provence-Alpes-Côte d'Azur
- Department: Hautes-Alpes
- No. of communes: {{{nbcomm}}}
- Disbanded: 2015
- Population (2012): 5,054

The canton of Gap-Campagne is a former administrative division in southeastern France. It was disbanded following the French canton reorganisation which came into effect in March 2015. It had 5,054 inhabitants (2012).

The canton comprised the following communes:

- La Freissinouse
- Gap (partly)
- Manteyer
- Pelleautier
- Rabou
- La Roche-des-Arnauds

== Demographics ==
Historical population
Year	Pop.	±%
1990	3,716	—
1999	3,758	+1.1%
2012	5,054	+34.5%

== See also ==
- Cantons of the Hautes-Alpes department
