= La Bâtie =

La Bâtie may refer to:

== Places in France ==
- Château de La Bâtie-Seyssel, a castle in Barby, Savoie

=== Communes ===
- La Bâtie-des-Fonds, Drôme
- La Bâtie-Divisin (former), Isère, Auvergne-Rhône-Alpes
- La Bâtie-Montgascon, Isère, Auvergne-Rhône-Alpes
- La Bâtie-Neuve, Hautes-Alpes
- La Bâtie-Rolland, Drôme
- La Bâtie-Vieille, Hautes-Alpes

== People ==
- Eugène Dejean de la Bâtie (1808–1948), Vietnamese journalist
