= Tallard (disambiguation) =

Tallard is a commune in France. It may also refer to:

- Suzanne Tallard (born 1943), French politician
- Camille d'Hostun, duc de Tallard, Marshal of France
- Marie Isabelle de Rohan, Duchess of Tallard, French noblewoman
- Canton of Tallard
