= Céüze 2000 =

Ski resort in the French Alps

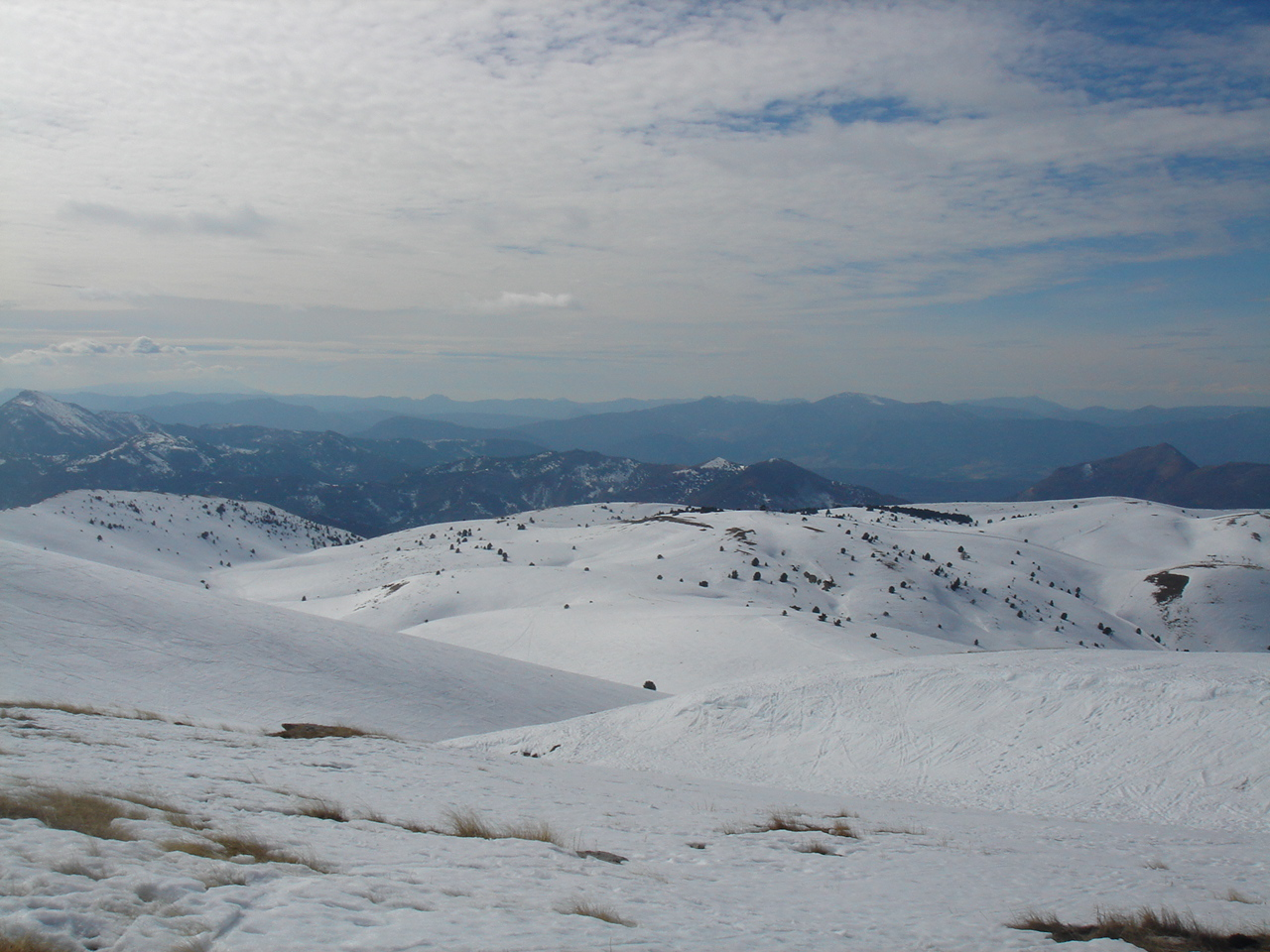
- The ski area of Céüze 2000

- Location within France Location within Provence-Alpes-Côte d'Azur Location within Alps
- Location: Manteyer, Hautes-Alpes, Provence-Alpes-Côte d'Azur, France
- Nearest city: Gap
- Coordinates: 44°31′06″N 5°56′13″E
- Opened: 1935
- Top elevation: 2,016 m (6,614 ft)
- Base elevation: 1,550 m (5,090 ft)
- Total length: 24 km (15 mi)
- Website: www.ceuze.fr

Céüze 2000 (also Gap Céüse 2000) was a winter sports resort located on the mountain of Céüse in the commune of Manteyer in the Hautes-Alpes department and Provence-Alpes-Côte d'Azur region of France. It closed in 2020 due to a lack of consistent snowfall.

== Geography ==
The winter sports resort is located in the Hautes-Alpes department, on the side of the Céüse mountain near Gap. It can be accessed either from Veynes or from Gap.

== History ==
The resort of Céüze was created in 1935 when the first ski lift was installed. Further ski lifts were installed from after the Second World War to 1962. The facilities then remained as they were until 1987, when the Torrent, Corniche and Aiguebelle ski lifts were installed. Cross-country skiing was also possible on the top of the mountain until the end of the 1980s. Skiers could be taken in snowcats. In the 2000s, the recurrent lack of snow in Céüse jeopardized the economy and the future of the resort, which was not equipped with snow cannons. A 2010 study proposed the conversion to a resort offering activities throughout the year. In 2018 and 2019, the resort did not open and remained threatened, like many other ski resorts in France.

The resort of Céüze closed permanently during the 2020 winter holidays. The decision to close was taken by the Buëch-Dévoluy community of communes, not only because of the lack of snow, but because of the impossibility of financing snow cannons to ensure the proper functioning of this resort. According to its president, its operation would lead to a deficit of €100,000.
