= Sigoyer, Hautes-Alpes =

Sigoyer
- Commune
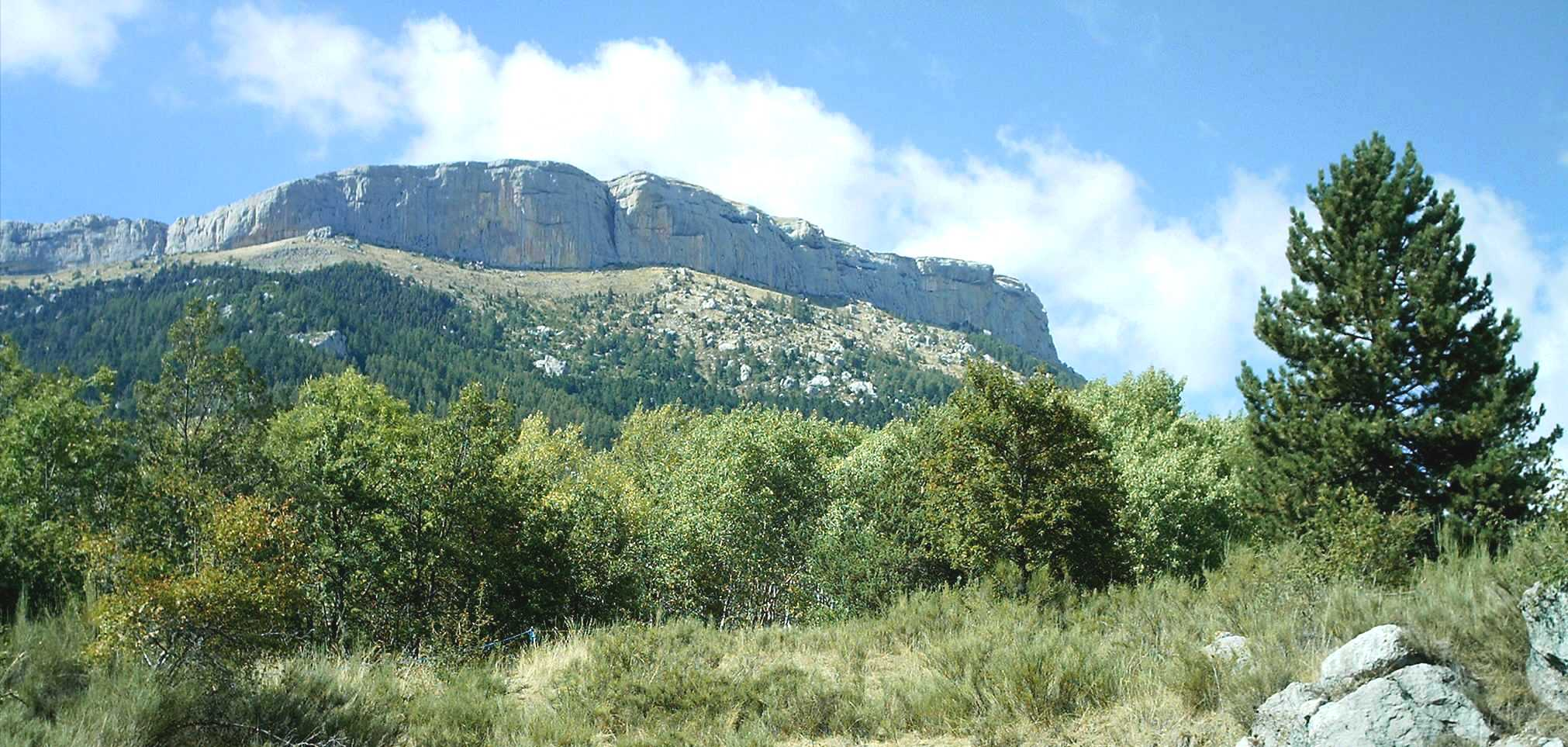
- A view of the south side of the Corniche de Céûse, seen from Sigoyer

- Coat of arms
- Location of Sigoyer
- Location within France Location within Provence-Alpes-Côte d'Azur
- Coordinates: 44°28′43″N 5°58′36″E
- Country: France
- Region: Provence-Alpes-Côte d'Azur
- Department: Hautes-Alpes
- Arrondissement: Gap
- Canton: Tallard
- Intercommunality: CA Gap-Tallard-Durance

Government
  - Mayor (2026–32): Denis Dugelay
- Area^{1}: 24.38 km^{2} (9.41 sq mi)
- Elevation: 1,060 m (3,480 ft)
- Highest elevation: 2,000 m (6,600 ft)
- Lowest elevation: 639 m (2,096 ft)
- Population (2023): 741
  - Density: 30.4/km^{2} (78.7/sq mi)
- Time zone: UTC+01:00 (CET)
  - Summer (DST): UTC+02:00 (CEST)
- INSEE/Postal code: 05168 /05130
- ^{1} French Land Register data, which excludes lakes, ponds, glaciers > 1 km^{2} (0.386 sq mi or 247 acres) and river estuaries.

Sigoyer (French pronunciation: [sigɔje]; Occitan: Sigoier) is a commune in the Hautes-Alpes department in southeastern France.

== Population ==
Historical population
Year	Pop.	±% p.a.
1968	304	—
1975	245	−3.04%
1982	306	+3.23%
1990	418	+3.98%
1999	583	+3.77%
2007	657	+1.50%
2012	646	−0.34%
2017	665	+0.58%
2023	741	+1.82%
Source: INSEE

== See also ==
- Communes of the Hautes-Alpes department
