= Lardier-et-Valença =

- Commune
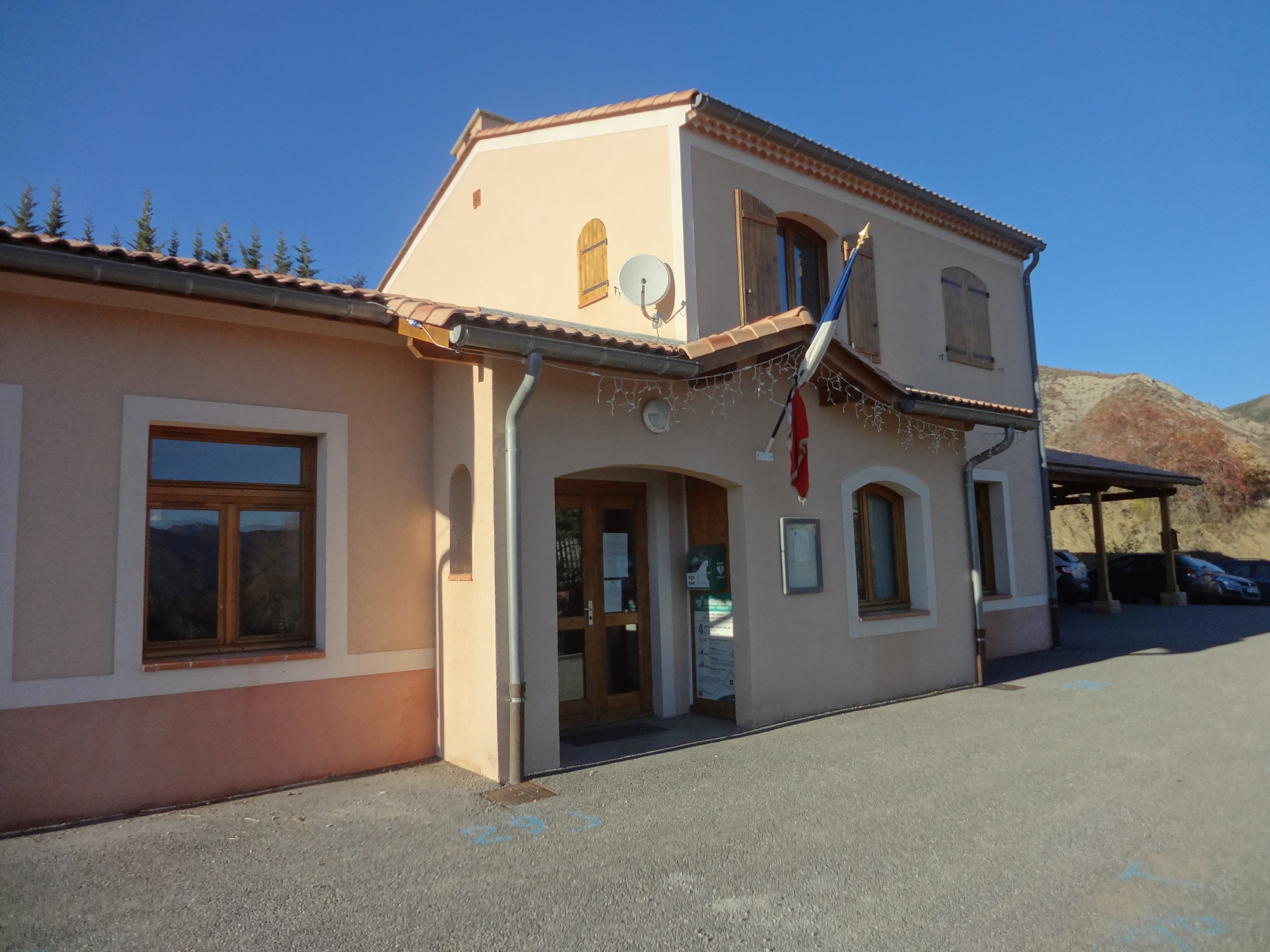
- The town hall of Lardiers-et-Valença

- Coat of arms
- Location of Lardier-et-Valença
- Location within France Location within Provence-Alpes-Côte d'Azur
- Coordinates: 44°26′08″N 5°58′53″E
- Country: France
- Region: Provence-Alpes-Côte d'Azur
- Department: Hautes-Alpes
- Arrondissement: Gap
- Canton: Tallard
- Intercommunality: CA Gap-Tallard-Durance

Government
  - Mayor (2026–32): Rémi Costorier
- Area^{1}: 14.86 km^{2} (5.74 sq mi)
- Elevation: 815 m (2,674 ft)
- Highest elevation: 1,482 m (4,862 ft)
- Lowest elevation: 548 m (1,798 ft)
- Population (2023): 391
  - Density: 26.3/km^{2} (68.1/sq mi)
- Time zone: UTC+01:00 (CET)
  - Summer (DST): UTC+02:00 (CEST)
- INSEE/Postal code: 05071 /05110
- ^{1} French Land Register data, which excludes lakes, ponds, glaciers > 1 km^{2} (0.386 sq mi or 247 acres) and river estuaries.

Lardier-et-Valença is a commune in the Hautes-Alpes department in southeastern France.

== Population ==
Historical population
Year	Pop.	±% p.a.
1968	157	—
1975	134	−2.24%
1982	145	+1.13%
1990	176	+2.45%
1999	198	+1.32%
2007	261	+3.51%
2012	312	+3.63%
2017	332	+1.25%
2023	391	+2.76%
Source: INSEE

== See also ==
- Communes of the Hautes-Alpes department
