= Neffes =

- Commune
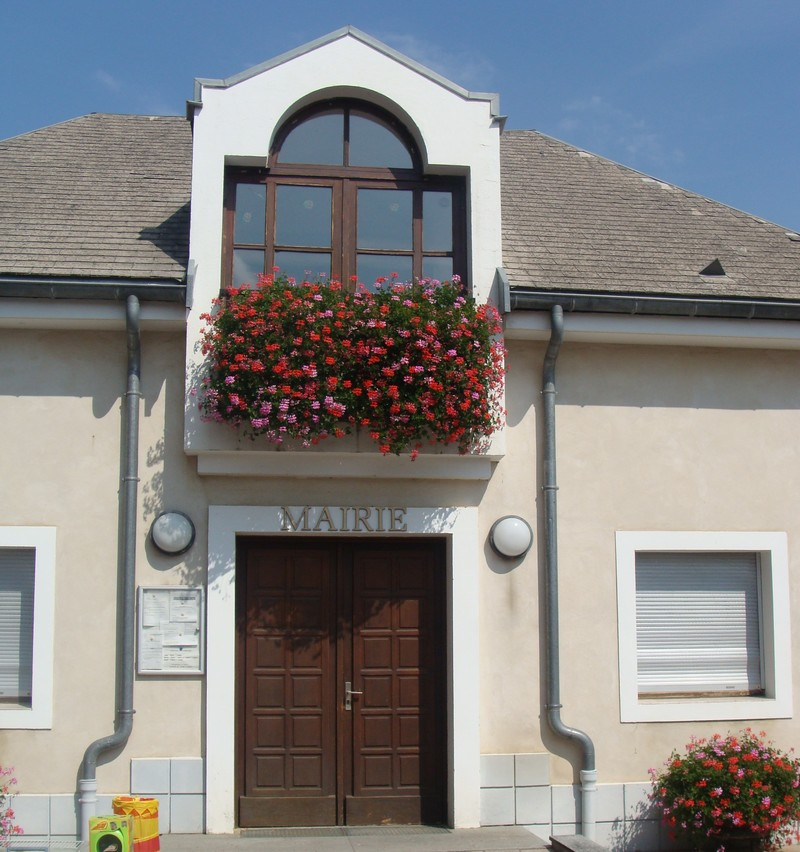
- The town hall of Neffes

- Coat of arms
- Location of Neffes
- Location within France Location within Provence-Alpes-Côte d'Azur
- Coordinates: 44°30′19″N 6°01′22″E
- Country: France
- Region: Provence-Alpes-Côte d'Azur
- Department: Hautes-Alpes
- Arrondissement: Gap
- Canton: Tallard
- Intercommunality: CA Gap-Tallard-Durance

Government
  - Mayor (2026–32): Michel Gay-Para
- Area^{1}: 8.36 km^{2} (3.23 sq mi)
- Elevation: 750 m (2,460 ft)
- Highest elevation: 892 m (2,927 ft)
- Lowest elevation: 633 m (2,077 ft)
- Population (2023): 804
  - Density: 96.2/km^{2} (249/sq mi)
- Time zone: UTC+01:00 (CET)
  - Summer (DST): UTC+02:00 (CEST)
- INSEE/Postal code: 05092 /05000
- ^{1} French Land Register data, which excludes lakes, ponds, glaciers > 1 km^{2} (0.386 sq mi or 247 acres) and river estuaries.

Neffes (French pronunciation: [nɛf]; Occitan: Nefas) is a commune in the Hautes-Alpes department in southeastern France.

== Population ==
Historical population
Year	Pop.	±% p.a.
1968	187	—
1975	247	+4.06%
1982	432	+8.31%
1990	510	+2.10%
1999	570	+1.24%
2007	709	+2.77%
2012	749	+1.10%
2017	748	−0.03%
2023	804	+1.21%
Source: INSEE

== See also ==
- Communes of the Hautes-Alpes department
