= Châteauvieux, Hautes-Alpes =

Châteauvieux Chasteuvielh (Occitan)
- Commune
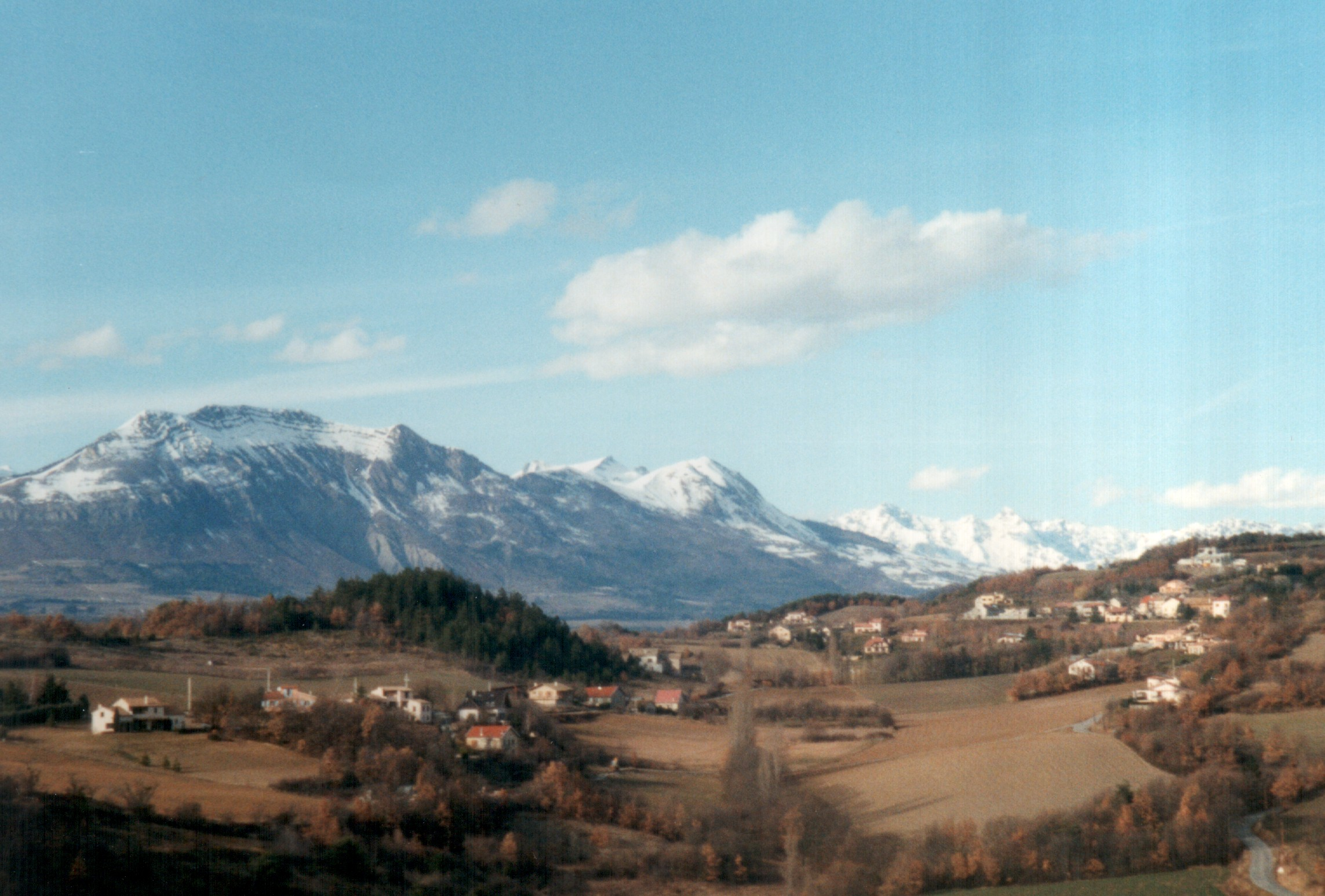
- A view of the village of Chateauvieux, from February 1994

- Coat of arms
- Location of Châteauvieux
- Location within France Location within Provence-Alpes-Côte d'Azur
- Coordinates: 44°29′05″N 6°03′06″E
- Country: France
- Region: Provence-Alpes-Côte d'Azur
- Department: Hautes-Alpes
- Arrondissement: Gap
- Canton: Tallard
- Intercommunality: CA Gap-Tallard-Durance

Government
  - Mayor (2026–32): Jean-Baptiste Aillaud
- Area^{1}: 7.07 km^{2} (2.73 sq mi)
- Elevation: 783 m (2,569 ft)
- Highest elevation: 960 m (3,150 ft)
- Lowest elevation: 612 m (2,008 ft)
- Population (2023): 545
  - Density: 77.1/km^{2} (200/sq mi)
- Time zone: UTC+01:00 (CET)
  - Summer (DST): UTC+02:00 (CEST)
- INSEE/Postal code: 05037 /05000
- ^{1} French Land Register data, which excludes lakes, ponds, glaciers > 1 km^{2} (0.386 sq mi or 247 acres) and river estuaries.

Châteauvieux (French: [ʃɑtovjø]; Occitan: Chasteuvielh) is a commune in the Hautes-Alpes department in southeastern France.

== Population ==
Historical population
Year	Pop.	±% p.a.
1968	142	—
1975	141	−0.10%
1982	240	+7.89%
1990	332	+4.14%
1999	408	+2.32%
2007	438	+0.89%
2012	464	+1.16%
2017	490	+1.10%
2023	545	+1.79%
Source: INSEE

== See also ==
- Communes of the Hautes-Alpes department
