= Fouillouse =

- Commune
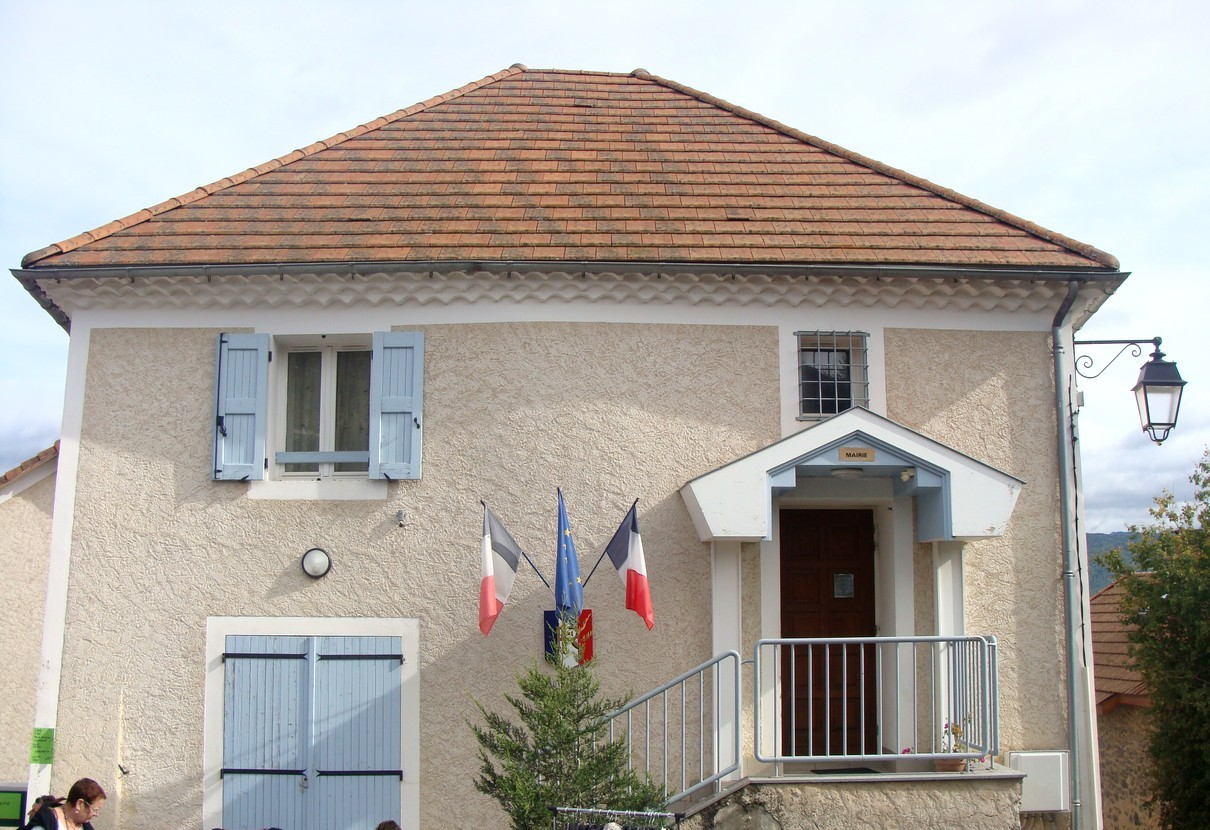
- The town hall of Fouillouse

- Coat of arms
- Location of Fouillouse
- Location within France Location within Provence-Alpes-Côte d'Azur
- Coordinates: 44°27′30″N 6°00′16″E
- Country: France
- Region: Provence-Alpes-Côte d'Azur
- Department: Hautes-Alpes
- Arrondissement: Gap
- Canton: Tallard
- Intercommunality: CA Gap-Tallard-Durance

Government
  - Mayor (2026–32): Serge Ayache
- Area^{1}: 7.24 km^{2} (2.80 sq mi)
- Elevation: 830 m (2,720 ft)
- Highest elevation: 1,081 m (3,547 ft)
- Lowest elevation: 599 m (1,965 ft)
- Population (2023): 276
  - Density: 38.1/km^{2} (98.7/sq mi)
- Time zone: UTC+01:00 (CET)
  - Summer (DST): UTC+02:00 (CEST)
- INSEE/Postal code: 05057 /05130
- ^{1} French Land Register data, which excludes lakes, ponds, glaciers > 1 km^{2} (0.386 sq mi or 247 acres) and river estuaries.

Fouillouse (French pronunciation: [fujuz]; Occitan: Folhosa) is a commune in the Hautes-Alpes department in southeastern France.

== Population ==
Historical population
Year	Pop.	±% p.a.
1968	87	—
1975	87	+0.00%
1982	95	+1.26%
1990	124	+3.39%
1999	138	+1.20%
2007	183	+3.59%
2012	202	+2.00%
2017	243	+3.77%
2023	276	+2.15%
Source: INSEE

== See also ==
- Communes of the Hautes-Alpes department
