= Céüse =

Mountain near Gap, France

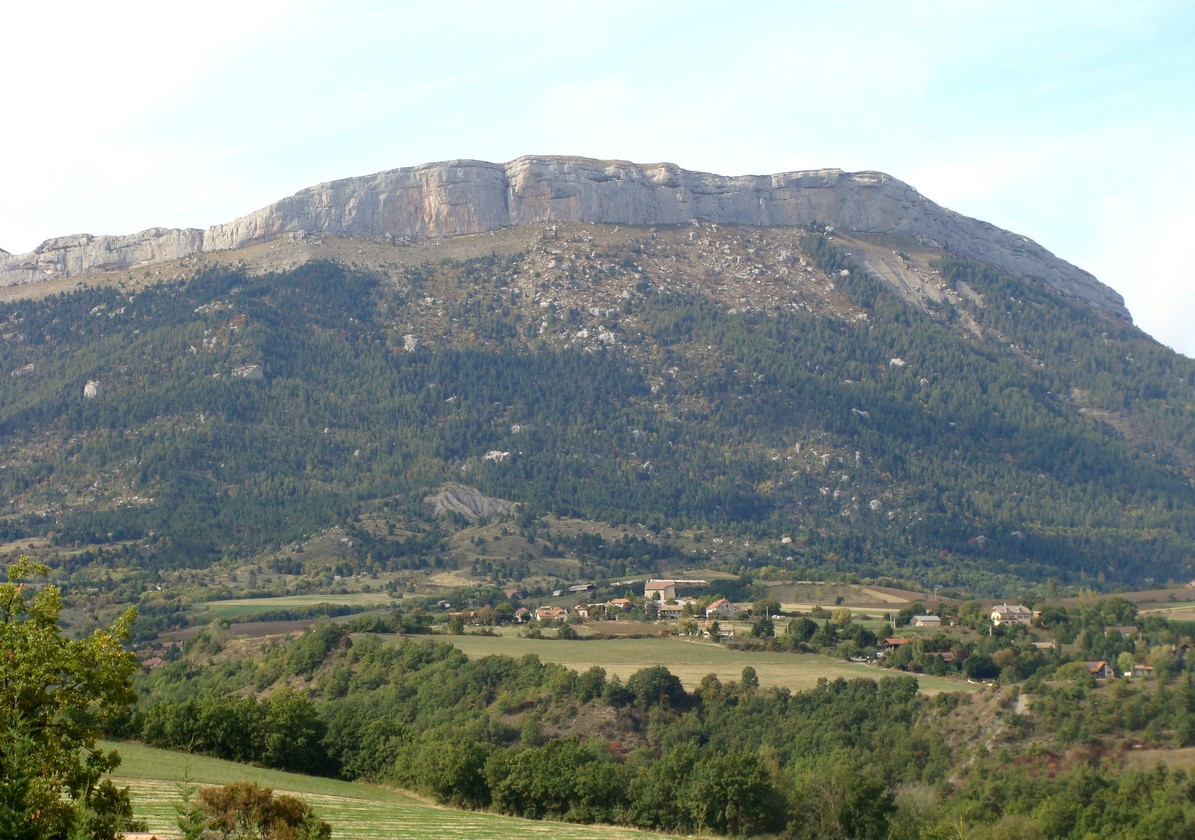
- South facing limestone cliffs of Céüse (the Corniche de Céûse)

Highest point
- Elevation: 2,016 m (6,614 ft)
- Prominence: 1,040 m (3,410 ft)
- Coordinates: 44°30′31″N 5°57′42″E

Naming
- English translation: flint, pebble
- Language of name: French

Geography
- Location within France
- Parent range: Dauphine Alps

Geology
- Rock type: Limestone

Céüse (French: Montagne de Céüse) is a limestone mountain in the Hautes-Alpes département of France near Gap and Sigoyer. The "Pic de Céüse" is at an elevation of 2,016 metres (6,614 ft), and the whole massif is included in the Natura 2000 protected area. The mountain has a distinctive large horseshoe-shaped cliff (the Corniche de Céûse) which contains some of the most extreme sport climbing routes in the world. It was also the site of a ski resort.

== Naming ==
According to Lou Tresor dóu Felibrige, the name "Céüse" comes from the Latin for flint, and also means "flint, pebble" in Occitan.

== Geology ==
The mountain is an example of a perched syncline, which presents as a south-facing horseshoe-shaped limestone cliff.

== Ski resort ==
The northern end of the mountain was the location of a small ski resort, called Céüze 2000 (or also the Gap Ceuse Ski Resort 2000); it was built after the Second World War and updated in the 1990s, and contains 8 lifts serving 35 kilometres of green, blue, red and black runs, from an elevation of 1,550 metres (5,090 ft) to the peak itself at 2,016 metres (6,614 ft).

== Climbing ==
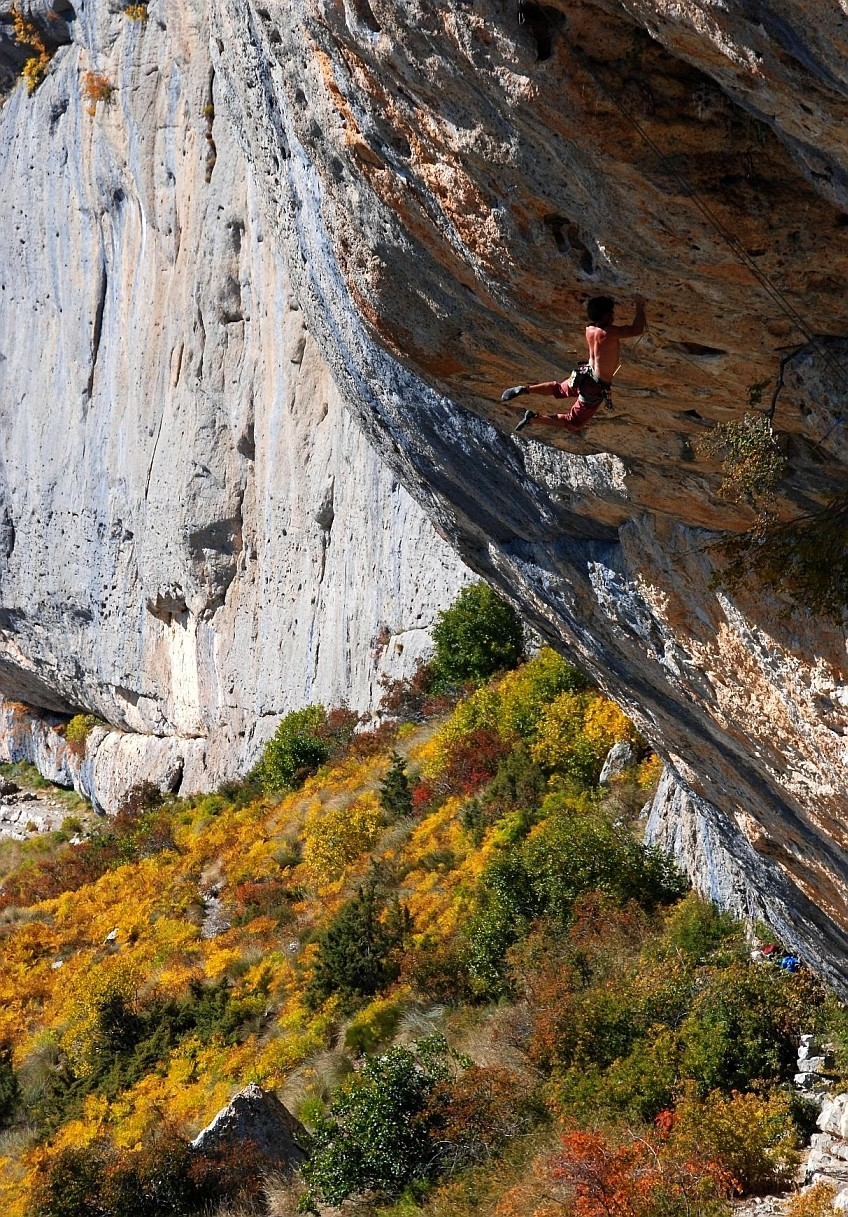
Rock climber on a sport climbing route in Ceuse in Autumn

The southern end of the mountain's long horseshoe-shaped limestone cliffs, the Corniche de Céûse, is the home to one of the world's best rock climbing crags, including several notable extreme sport climbing routes such as Realization/Biographie 9a+ (5.15a), and Bibliographie 9b+ (5.15c). Another notable route Pornographie 9a (5.14d) was established in 2020 by Alex Megos. Its south-facing cliffs have a distinctive blue and ochre colouring, and the climbing is via pocket-marks in the limestone rather than via cracks. The Corniche has over 600 climbing routes from 4a (5.4) to the highest grades in rock climbing, and is situated at an elevation of 1,800 metres (5,900 ft). Most of the climbs are single-pitch 25 to 40-metre climbs, with long-run outs often between bolts, however, there are also 200-metre sections with multi-pitch routes.

== See also ==
- Buoux, leading limestone rock climbing crag in France
- Verdon Gorge, leading limestone rock climbing crag in France
