= Lettret =

- Commune
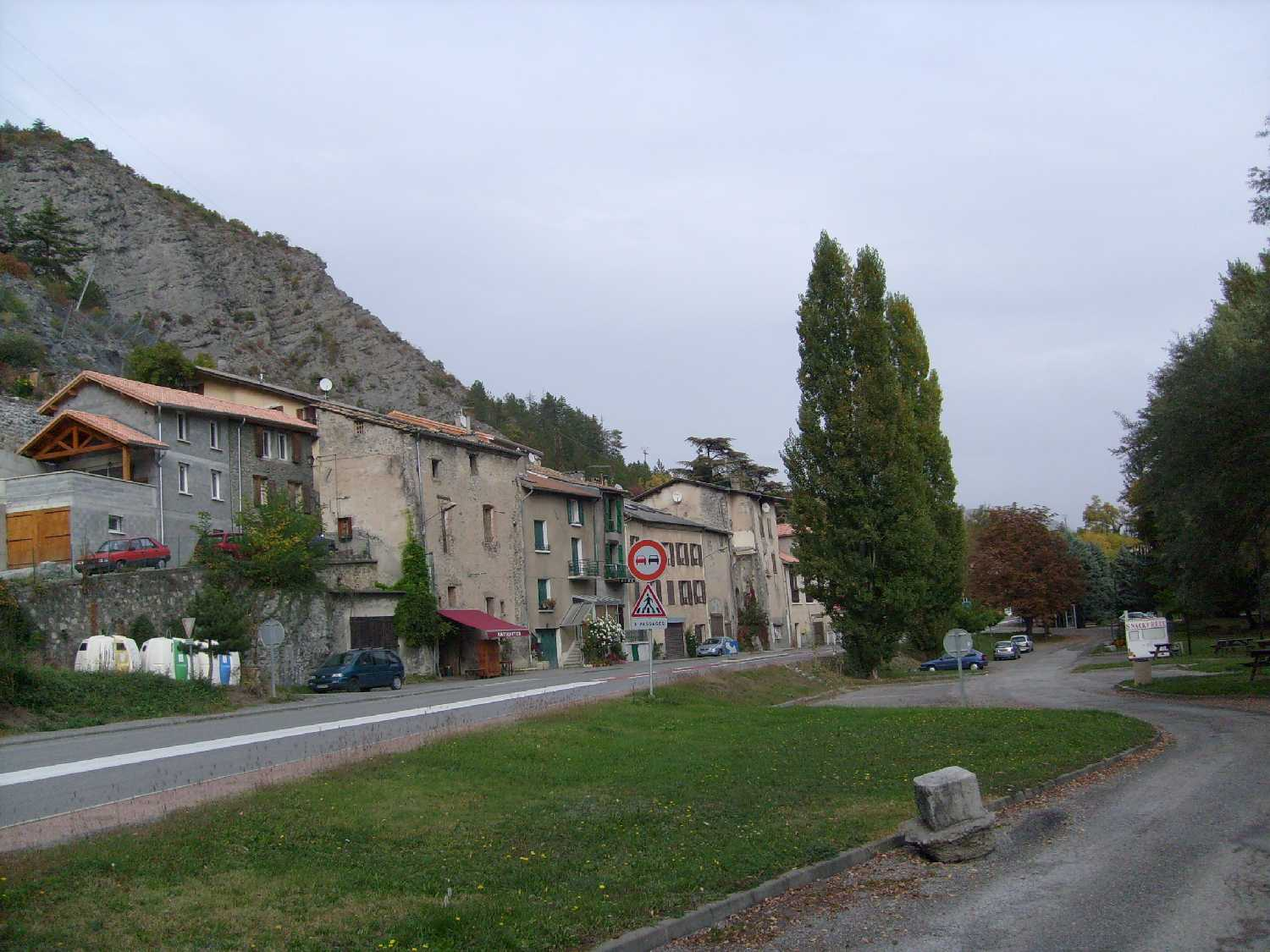
- A view of the village of Lettret

- Coat of arms
- Location of Lettret
- Location within France Location within Provence-Alpes-Côte d'Azur
- Coordinates: 44°28′09″N 6°03′42″E
- Country: France
- Region: Provence-Alpes-Côte d'Azur
- Department: Hautes-Alpes
- Arrondissement: Gap
- Canton: Tallard
- Intercommunality: CA Gap-Tallard-Durance

Government
  - Mayor (2026–32): Rémy Oddou
- Area^{1}: 4.2 km^{2} (1.6 sq mi)
- Elevation: 600 m (2,000 ft)
- Highest elevation: 960 m (3,150 ft)
- Lowest elevation: 591 m (1,939 ft)
- Population (2023): 196
  - Density: 47/km^{2} (120/sq mi)
- Time zone: UTC+01:00 (CET)
  - Summer (DST): UTC+02:00 (CEST)
- INSEE/Postal code: 05074 /05130
- ^{1} French Land Register data, which excludes lakes, ponds, glaciers > 1 km^{2} (0.386 sq mi or 247 acres) and river estuaries.

Lettret (French pronunciation: [lɛtʁɛ]; Occitan: L'Estrech) is a commune in the Hautes-Alpes department in southeastern France.

== Population ==
Historical population
Year	Pop.	±% p.a.
1968	61	—
1975	55	−1.47%
1982	81	+5.69%
1990	92	+1.60%
1999	109	+1.90%
2007	159	+4.83%
2012	176	+2.05%
2017	182	+0.67%
2023	196	+1.24%
Source: INSEE

== See also ==
- Communes of the Hautes-Alpes department
