= Claret, Alpes-de-Haute-Provence =

Claret
- Commune
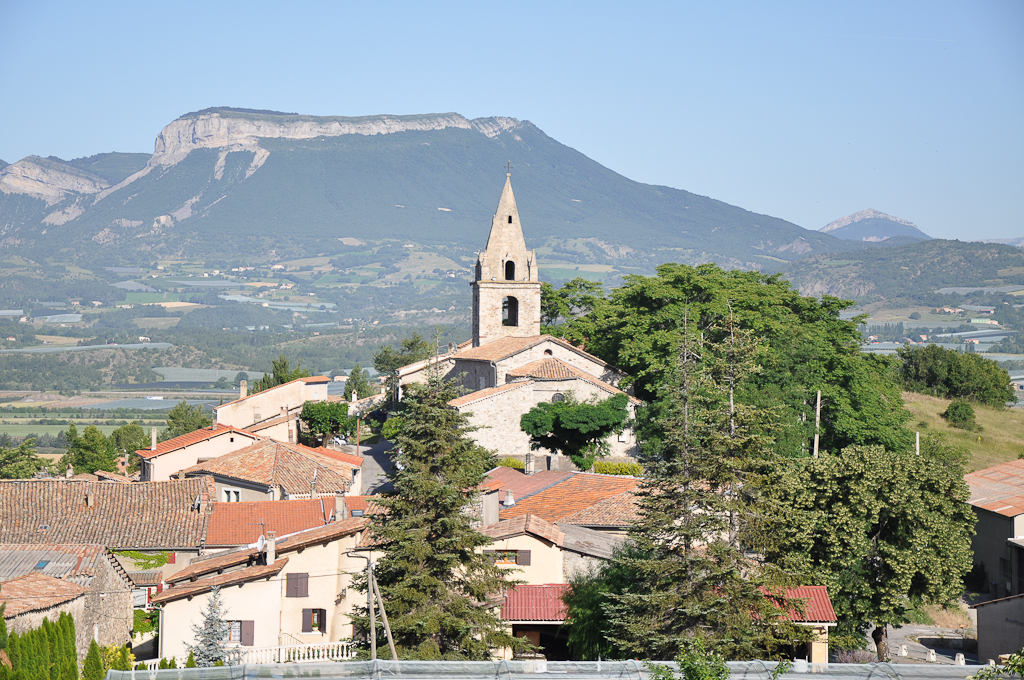
- The church and surrounding buildings in Claret

- Coat of arms
- Location of Claret
- Location within France Location within Provence-Alpes-Côte d'Azur
- Coordinates: 44°22′22″N 5°57′23″E
- Country: France
- Region: Provence-Alpes-Côte d'Azur
- Department: Alpes-de-Haute-Provence
- Arrondissement: Forcalquier
- Canton: Seyne
- Intercommunality: CA Gap-Tallard-Durance

Government
  - Mayor (2026–32): Frédéric Louche
- Area^{1}: 21.04 km^{2} (8.12 sq mi)
- Highest elevation: 1,254 m (4,114 ft)
- Lowest elevation: 528 m (1,732 ft)
- Population (2023): 298
  - Density: 14.2/km^{2} (36.7/sq mi)
- Time zone: UTC+01:00 (CET)
  - Summer (DST): UTC+02:00 (CEST)
- INSEE/Postal code: 04058 /05110
- ^{1} French Land Register data, which excludes lakes, ponds, glaciers > 1 km^{2} (0.386 sq mi or 247 acres) and river estuaries.

Claret (French pronunciation: [klaʁɛ]) is a commune in the Alpes-de-Haute-Provence department in southeastern France.

== Population ==
Historical population
Year	Pop.	±% p.a.
1968	145	—
1975	140	−0.50%
1982	132	−0.84%
1990	189	+4.59%
1999	249	+3.11%
2007	224	−1.31%
2012	250	+2.22%
2017	269	+1.48%
2023	298	+1.72%
Source: INSEE

== See also ==
- Communes of the Alpes-de-Haute-Provence department
