= Jarjayes =

- Commune
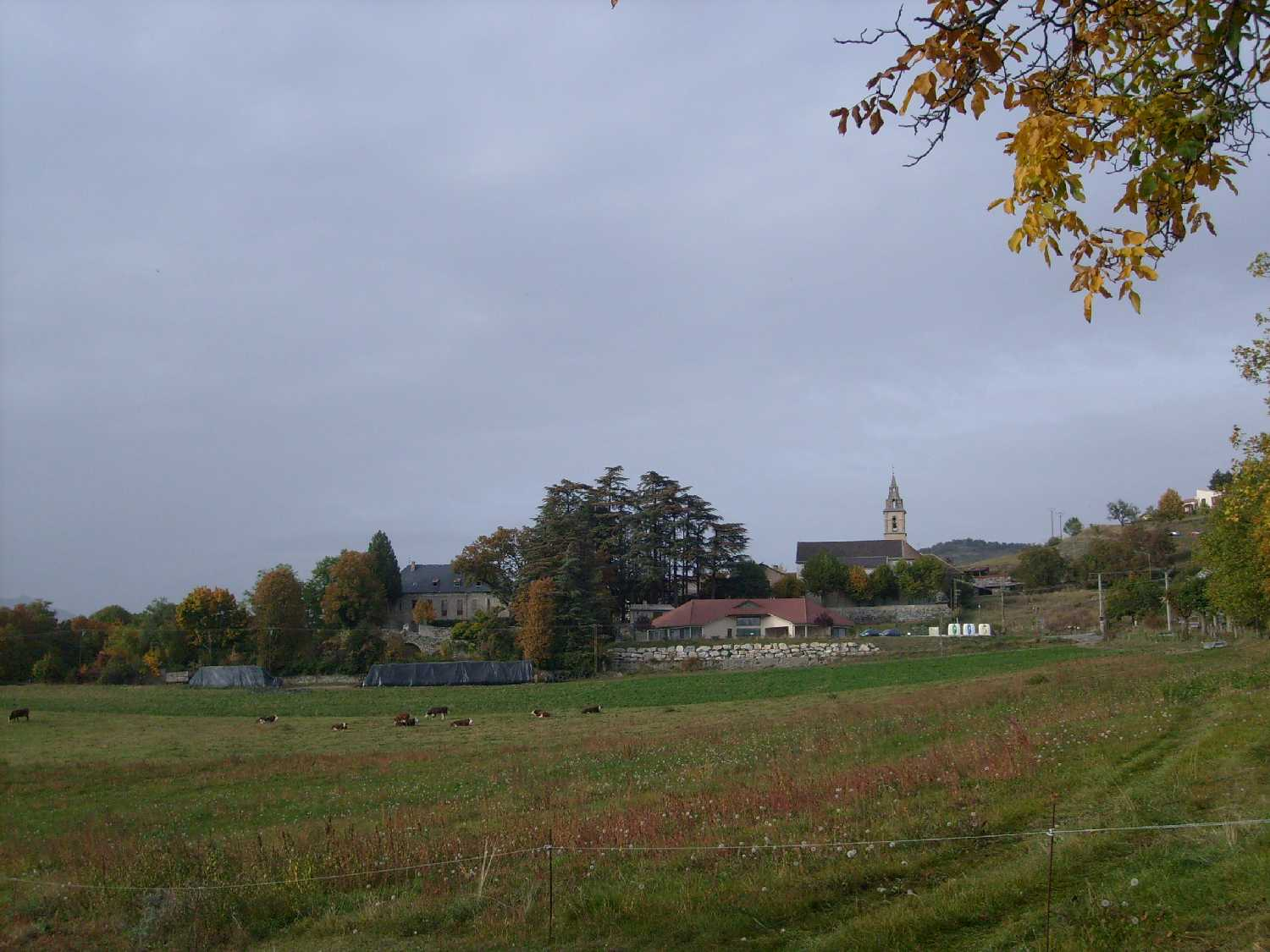
- A view of the southern part of the village

- Coat of arms
- Location of Jarjayes
- Location within France Location within Provence-Alpes-Côte d'Azur
- Coordinates: 44°30′22″N 6°06′40″E
- Country: France
- Region: Provence-Alpes-Côte d'Azur
- Department: Hautes-Alpes
- Arrondissement: Gap
- Canton: Tallard
- Intercommunality: CA Gap-Tallard-Durance

Government
  - Mayor (2026–32): Gerald Bordiga
- Area^{1}: 22.67 km^{2} (8.75 sq mi)
- Elevation: 999 m (3,278 ft)
- Highest elevation: 1,310 m (4,300 ft)
- Lowest elevation: 586 m (1,923 ft)
- Population (2023): 465
  - Density: 20.5/km^{2} (53.1/sq mi)
- Time zone: UTC+01:00 (CET)
  - Summer (DST): UTC+02:00 (CEST)
- INSEE/Postal code: 05068 /05130
- ^{1} French Land Register data, which excludes lakes, ponds, glaciers > 1 km^{2} (0.386 sq mi or 247 acres) and river estuaries.

Jarjayes (French pronunciation: [ʒaʁʒaj]; Occitan: Jarjalhas) is a commune in the Hautes-Alpes department in southeastern France.

== Population ==
Historical population
Year	Pop.	±% p.a.
1968	196	—
1975	203	+0.50%
1982	254	+3.25%
1990	312	+2.60%
1999	379	+2.19%
2007	415	+1.14%
2012	418	+0.14%
2017	450	+1.49%
2023	465	+0.55%
Source: INSEE

== See also ==
- Communes of the Hautes-Alpes department
