= La Bâtie-Vieille =

- Commune
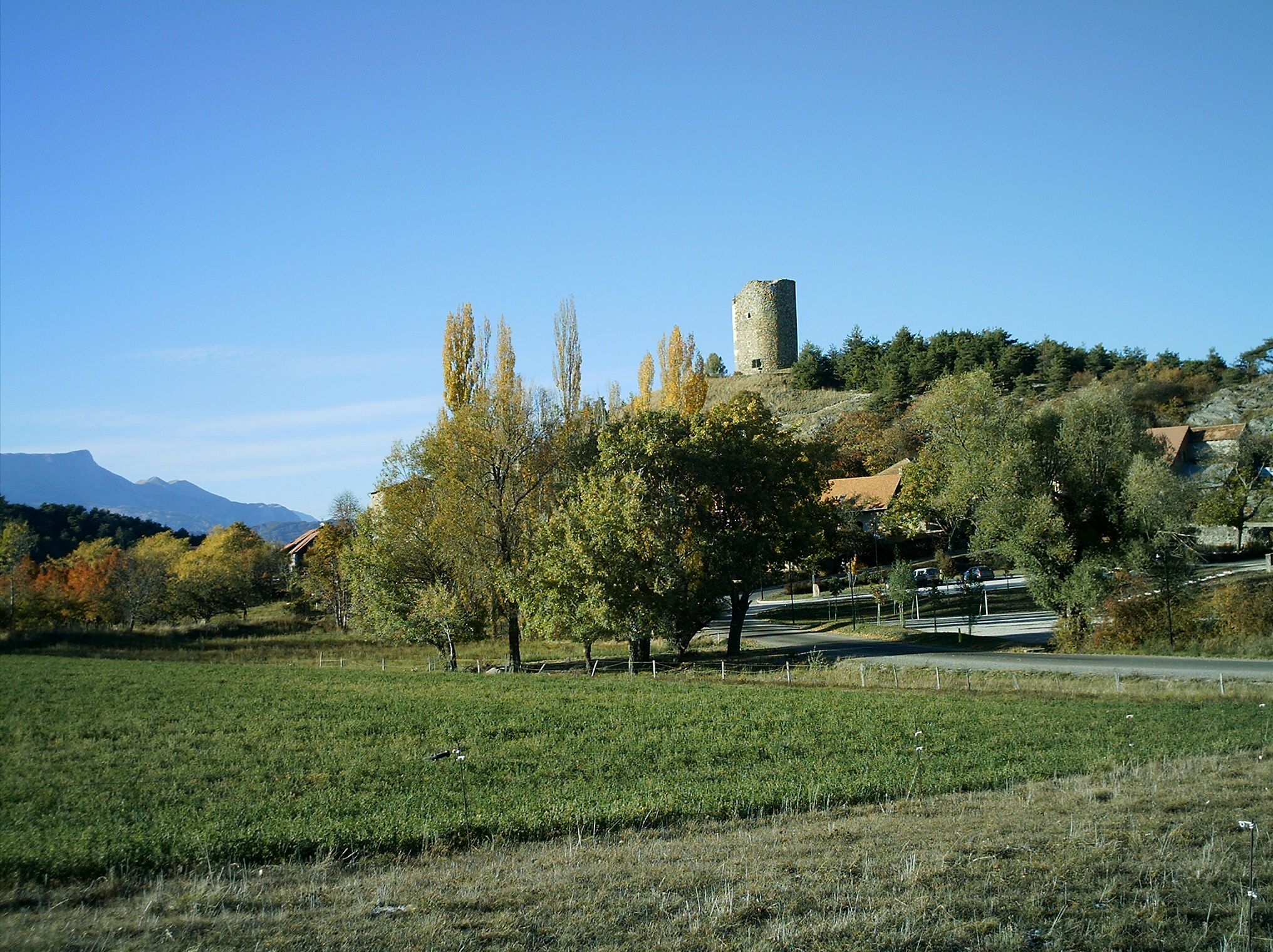
- The 12th century tower overlooks the village
- Location of La Bâtie-Vieille
- Location within France Location within Provence-Alpes-Côte d'Azur
- Coordinates: 44°33′17″N 6°09′46″E
- Country: France
- Region: Provence-Alpes-Côte d'Azur
- Department: Hautes-Alpes
- Arrondissement: Gap
- Canton: Tallard
- Intercommunality: Serre-Ponçon Val d'Avance

Government
  - Mayor (2026–32): Francis Cester
- Area^{1}: 9.05 km^{2} (3.49 sq mi)
- Elevation: 1,030 m (3,380 ft)
- Highest elevation: 1,152 m (3,780 ft)
- Lowest elevation: 798 m (2,618 ft)
- Population (2023): 340
  - Density: 38/km^{2} (97/sq mi)
- Time zone: UTC+01:00 (CET)
  - Summer (DST): UTC+02:00 (CEST)
- INSEE/Postal code: 05018 /05000
- ^{1} French Land Register data, which excludes lakes, ponds, glaciers > 1 km^{2} (0.386 sq mi or 247 acres) and river estuaries.

La Bâtie-Vieille (French pronunciation: [la bati vjɛj]; Occitan: La Bastia Vielha) is a commune in the Hautes-Alpes department in southeastern France.

== Location ==
The village is 5 km (3.1 mi) away from La Bâtie-Neuve, 8 km from Gap, 11 km (6.8 mi) from Chorges and 21 km (13 mi) from Tallard.

== Population ==
Historical population
Year	Pop.	±% p.a.
1968	106	—
1975	89	−2.47%
1982	166	+9.31%
1990	208	+2.86%
1999	246	+1.88%
2007	257	+0.55%
2012	301	+3.21%
2017	342	+2.59%
2023	340	−0.10%
Source: INSEE

== See also ==
- Communes of the Hautes-Alpes department
