= Tallard =

Tallard Talard (Occitan)
- Commune
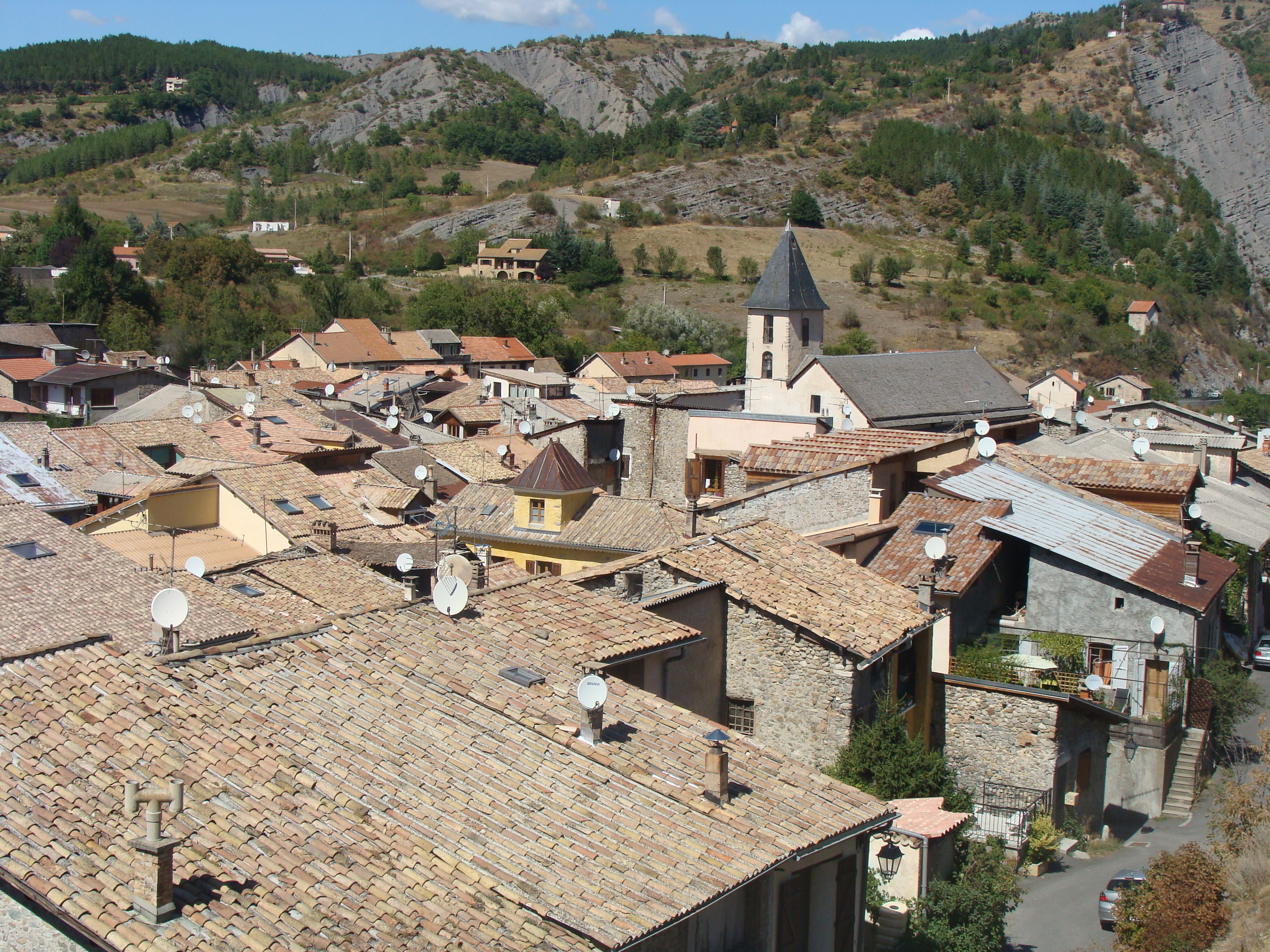
- Town centre

- Coat of arms
- Location of Tallard
- Location within France Location within Provence-Alpes-Côte d'Azur
- Coordinates: 44°27′45″N 6°03′19″E
- Country: France
- Region: Provence-Alpes-Côte d'Azur
- Department: Hautes-Alpes
- Arrondissement: Gap
- Canton: Tallard
- Intercommunality: CA Gap-Tallard-Durance

Government
  - Mayor (2026–32): Marie-Christine Lazaro
- Area^{1}: 15.02 km^{2} (5.80 sq mi)
- Elevation: 604 m (1,982 ft)
- Highest elevation: 1,121 m (3,678 ft)
- Lowest elevation: 570 m (1,870 ft)
- Population (2023): 2,292
  - Density: 152.6/km^{2} (395.2/sq mi)
- Demonym: Tallardiens
- Time zone: UTC+01:00 (CET)
  - Summer (DST): UTC+02:00 (CEST)
- INSEE/Postal code: 05170 /05130
- Website: www.ville-tallard.fr
- ^{1} French Land Register data, which excludes lakes, ponds, glaciers > 1 km^{2} (0.386 sq mi or 247 acres) and river estuaries.

Tallard (French pronunciation: [talaʁ]; Occitan: Talard) is a commune in the Hautes-Alpes department in the Provence-Alpes-Côte d'Azur region in Southeastern France. It is on the departmental border with Alpes-de-Haute-Provence, on the river Durance.

== Geography ==
Tallard is 20 km (12 mi) to the south of Gap, close to the road from Gap to Marseille. The A51 autoroute ends just to the southwest, near the village of La Saulce.

The town is also home to the internationally renowned Gap-Tallard Aerodrome, home of CERPS Skydiving Club and French military parachute training.

== History ==
Tallard was mentioned in a document from the 7th century. From the 10th century, the town built defensive walls.

In 1209 the Prince of Orange granted Tallard a freedom charter; in 1215, Tiburge of Baux (daughter of William I of Baux) and her nephew sold the lordship of Tallard to the Knights Hospitalier. In 1322, the Knights exchanged Tallard for a county in Sicily that belonged to Arnaud de Trians, nephew of Pope John XXII. In 1326, the lordship of Tallard was elevated to a viscountcy by Robert, King of Naples and Count of Provence, in favour of Arnaud de Trians, who built a castle at Tallard, just south of the current-day town centre. In the 14th–15th centuries, the Château de Tallard was expanded, but in 1692, Victor Amadeus II and his troops attacked and damaged it.

== Politics ==
Jean-Michel Arnaud (formerly of the Union for French Democracy) was mayor of Tallard from 2001 to 2020. Daniel Borel was elected mayor in 2020, following Arnaud's election to the Senate.

== Demographics ==
Inhabitants are called Tallardiens (masculine) and Tallardiennes (feminine) in French.

Historical population
Year	Pop.	±% p.a.
1968	1,063	—
1975	1,092	+0.39%
1982	1,155	+0.80%
1990	1,187	+0.34%
1999	1,298	+1.00%
2007	1,874	+4.70%
2012	2,020	+1.51%
2017	2,206	+1.78%
2023	2,292	+0.64%
Source: INSEE

== Tour de France ==
In 2007, Tallard was the start for the 229.5 km (142.6 mi) stage 10 of the Tour de France to Marseille.

== See also ==
- Communes of the Hautes-Alpes department
