= La Freissinouse =

- Commune
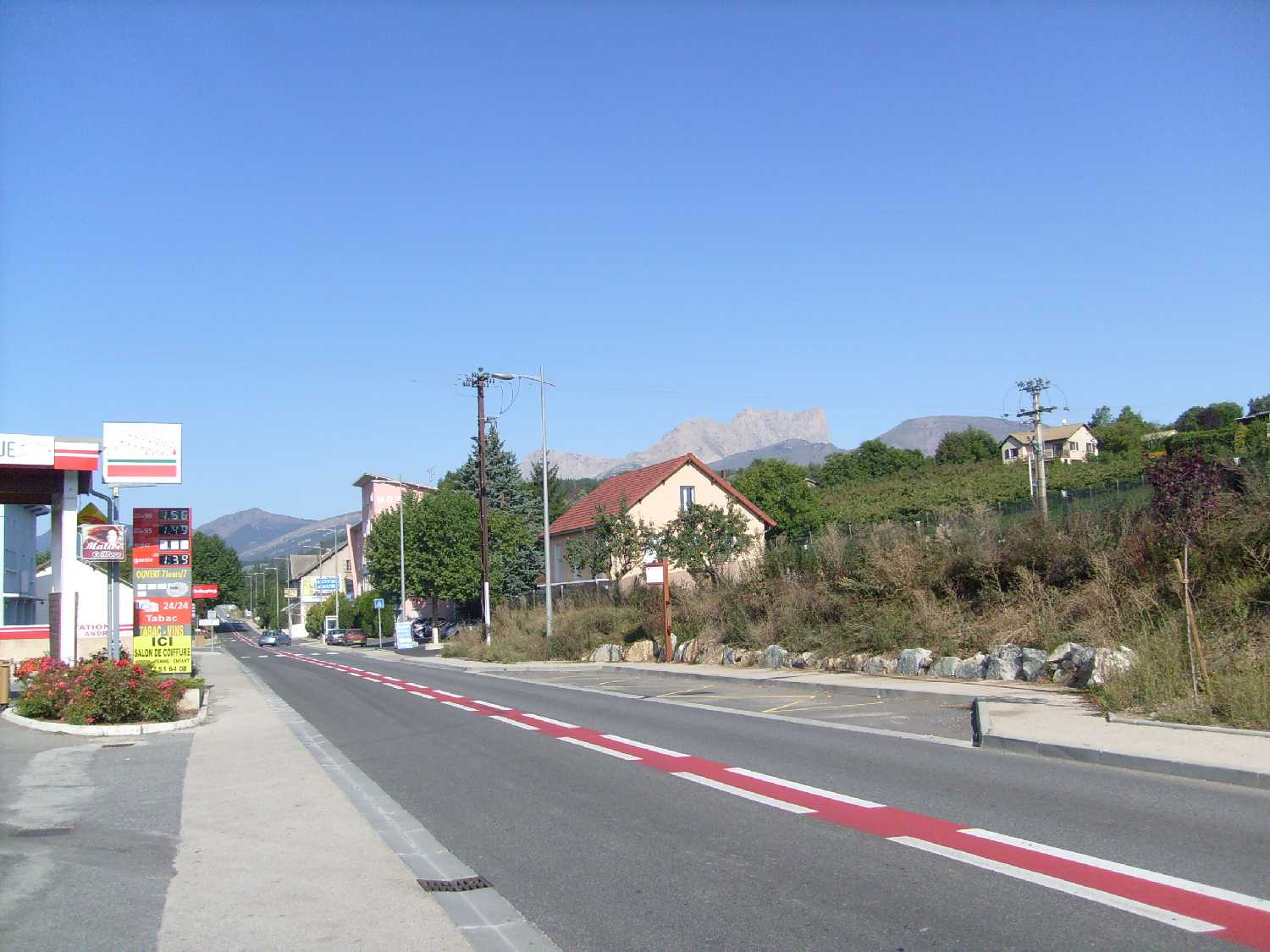
- The main road D994, through La Freissinouse

- Coat of arms
- Location of La Freissinouse
- Location within France Location within Provence-Alpes-Côte d'Azur
- Coordinates: 44°32′08″N 6°00′38″E
- Country: France
- Region: Provence-Alpes-Côte d'Azur
- Department: Hautes-Alpes
- Arrondissement: Gap
- Canton: Tallard
- Intercommunality: CA Gap-Tallard-Durance

Government
  - Mayor (2026–32): Gérald Chenavier
- Area^{1}: 8.32 km^{2} (3.21 sq mi)
- Elevation: 969 m (3,179 ft)
- Highest elevation: 1,232 m (4,042 ft)
- Lowest elevation: 840 m (2,760 ft)
- Population (2023): 972
  - Density: 117/km^{2} (303/sq mi)
- Time zone: UTC+01:00 (CET)
  - Summer (DST): UTC+02:00 (CEST)
- INSEE/Postal code: 05059 /05000
- ^{1} French Land Register data, which excludes lakes, ponds, glaciers > 1 km^{2} (0.386 sq mi or 247 acres) and river estuaries.

La Freissinouse (French pronunciation: [la fʁɛsinuz]) is a commune in the Hautes-Alpes department in southeastern France.

== Population ==
Historical population
| Year | Pop. | ±% p.a. |
|---|---|---|
| 1968 | 228 | — |
| 1975 | 224 | −0.25% |
| 1982 | 334 | +5.87% |
| 1990 | 365 | +1.12% |
| 1999 | 456 | +2.50% |
| 2007 | 501 | +1.18% |
| 2012 | 648 | +5.28% |
| 2017 | 849 | +5.55% |
| 2023 | 972 | +2.28% |
Source: INSEE

== See also ==
- Communes of the Hautes-Alpes department
