= Pelleautier =

- Commune
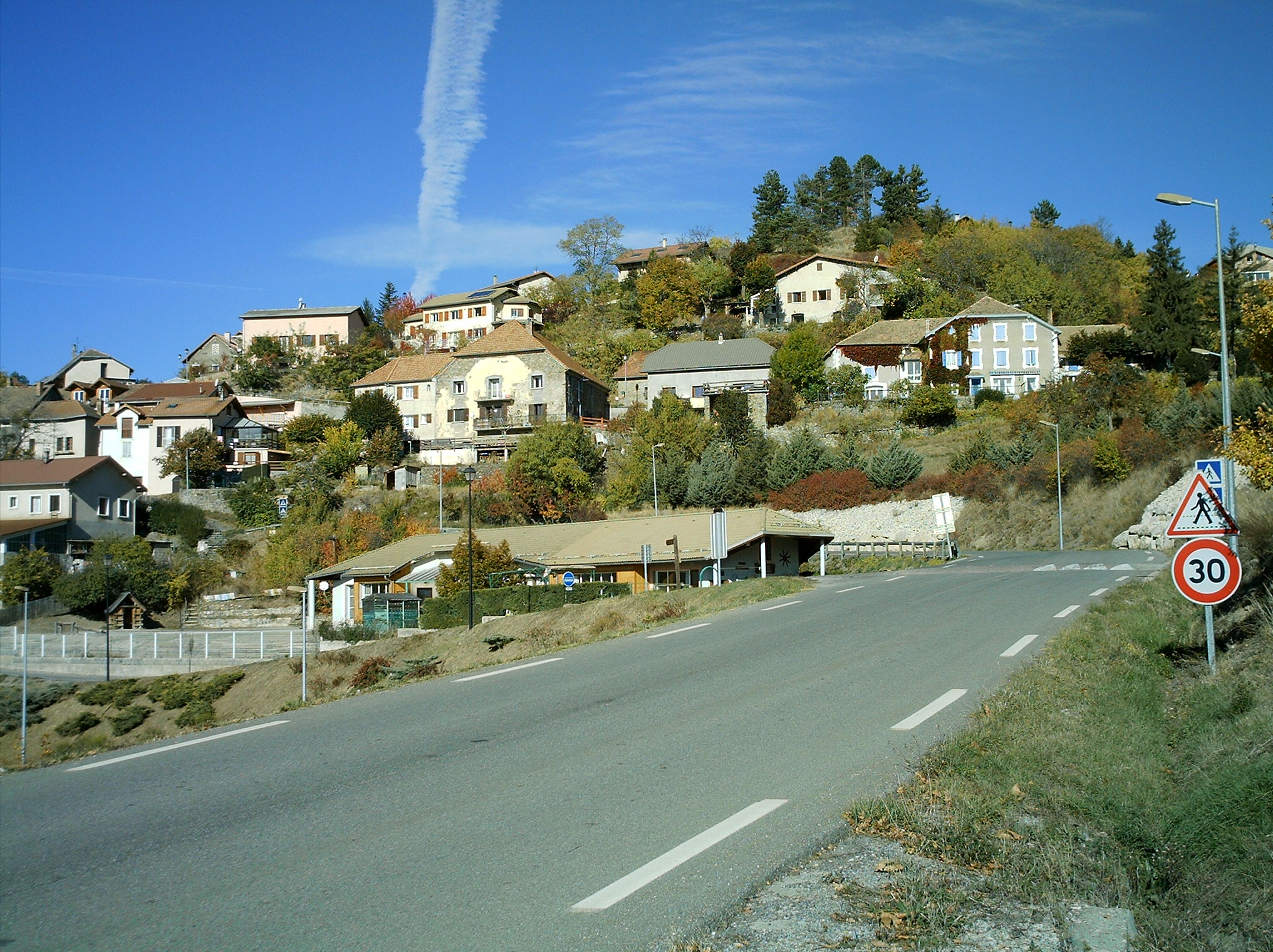
- A view of the road entering the village of Pelleautier

- Coat of arms
- Location of Pelleautier
- Location within France Location within Provence-Alpes-Côte d'Azur
- Coordinates: 44°31′04″N 6°01′02″E
- Country: France
- Region: Provence-Alpes-Côte d'Azur
- Department: Hautes-Alpes
- Arrondissement: Gap
- Canton: Tallard
- Intercommunality: CA Gap-Tallard-Durance

Government
  - Mayor (2026–32): Christian Hubaud
- Area^{1}: 12.81 km^{2} (4.95 sq mi)
- Elevation: 925 m (3,035 ft)
- Highest elevation: 2,016 m (6,614 ft)
- Lowest elevation: 737 m (2,418 ft)
- Population (2023): 863
  - Density: 67.4/km^{2} (174/sq mi)
- Time zone: UTC+01:00 (CET)
  - Summer (DST): UTC+02:00 (CEST)
- INSEE/Postal code: 05100 /05000
- ^{1} French Land Register data, which excludes lakes, ponds, glaciers > 1 km^{2} (0.386 sq mi or 247 acres) and river estuaries.

Pelleautier (French pronunciation: [pɛlotje]; Occitan: Pelautier) is a commune in the Hautes-Alpes department in southeastern France.

== Population ==
Historical population
Year	Pop.	±% p.a.
1968	206	—
1975	230	+1.59%
1982	321	+4.88%
1990	378	+2.06%
1999	391	+0.38%
2007	539	+4.09%
2012	643	+3.59%
2017	715	+2.15%
2023	863	+3.19%
Source: INSEE

== See also ==
- Communes of the Hautes-Alpes department
