= Patricia Morhet-Richaud =

French politician

Patricia Morhet-Richaud (born 28 July 1961) is a member of the French Senate representing the department of Hautes-Alpes.

== Early career ==
Before entering politics, Morhet-Richaud worked for an agricultural cooperative.

== Political career ==
Morhet-Richaud was elected to the French senate on 28 December 2014 following the death of senator Jean-Yves Dusserre. She succeeded her father Claude Morhet as mayor of the commune of Lazer in 2007. Morhet-Richaud was first elected to the municipal council for Lazer in 2001.

== Political positions ==
In the Republicans’ 2016 presidential primaries, Morhet-Richaud endorsed Bruno Le Maire as the party's candidate for the office of President of France.
