= La Saulce =

- Commune
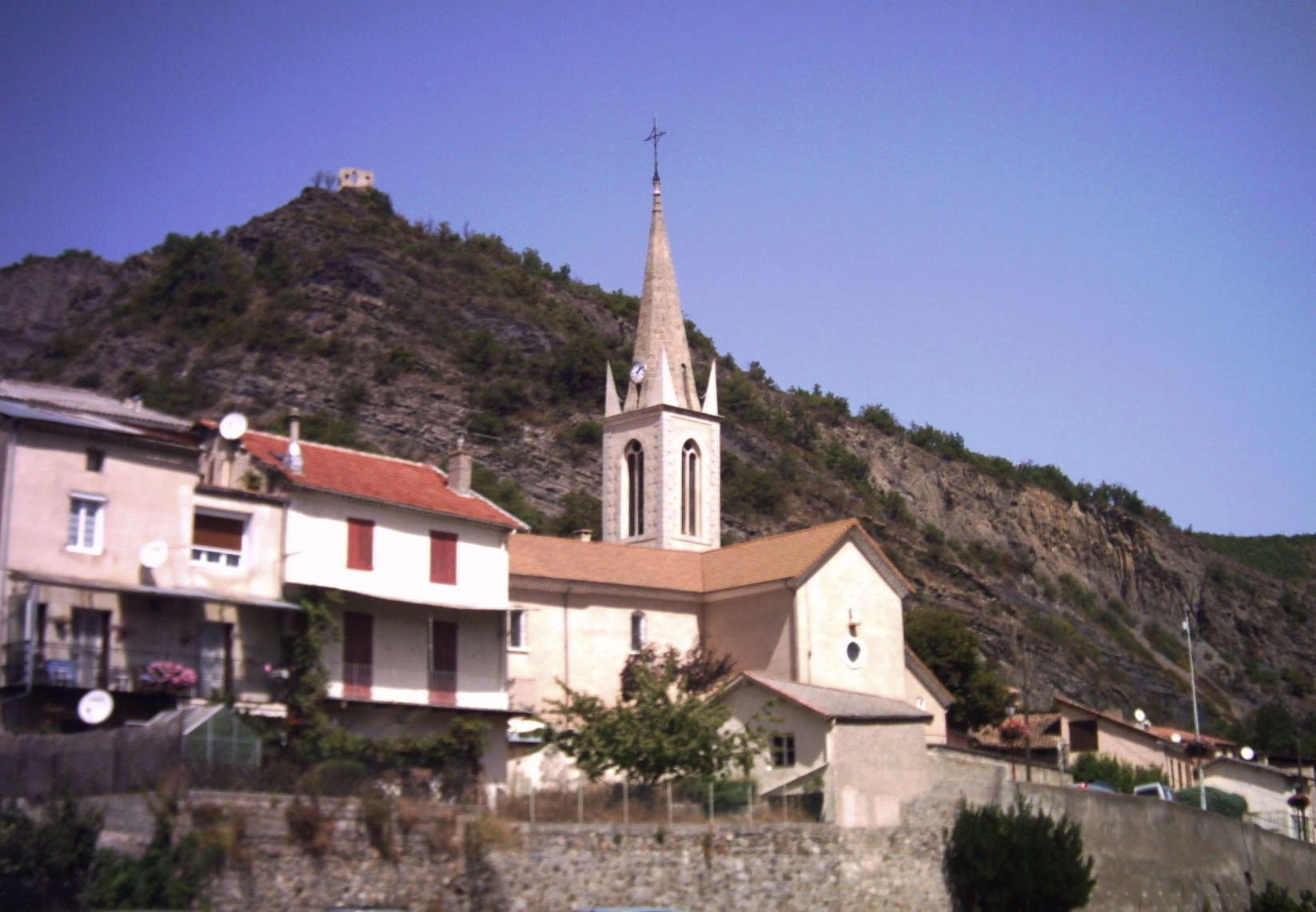
- The church and surrounding buildings in La Saulce

- Coat of arms
- Location of La Saulce
- Location within France Location within Provence-Alpes-Côte d'Azur
- Coordinates: 44°25′34″N 6°00′31″E
- Country: France
- Region: Provence-Alpes-Côte d'Azur
- Department: Hautes-Alpes
- Arrondissement: Gap
- Canton: Tallard
- Intercommunality: CA Gap-Tallard-Durance

Government
  - Mayor (2026–32): Roger Grimaud
- Area^{1}: 7.89 km^{2} (3.05 sq mi)
- Elevation: 585 m (1,919 ft)
- Highest elevation: 1,046 m (3,432 ft)
- Lowest elevation: 555 m (1,821 ft)
- Population (2023): 1,369
  - Density: 174/km^{2} (449/sq mi)
- Time zone: UTC+01:00 (CET)
  - Summer (DST): UTC+02:00 (CEST)
- INSEE/Postal code: 05162 /05110
- ^{1} French Land Register data, which excludes lakes, ponds, glaciers > 1 km^{2} (0.386 sq mi or 247 acres) and river estuaries.

La Saulce (French pronunciation: [la sols]; Occitan: La Sauça) is a commune in the Hautes-Alpes department in southeastern France.

== Population ==
Historical population
Year	Pop.	±% p.a.
1968	565	—
1975	688	+2.85%
1982	638	−1.07%
1990	632	−0.12%
1999	905	+4.07%
2007	1,249	+4.11%
2012	1,319	+1.10%
2017	1,555	+3.35%
2023	1,369	−2.10%
Source: INSEE

== See also ==
- Communes of the Hautes-Alpes department
