= Valserres =

- Commune
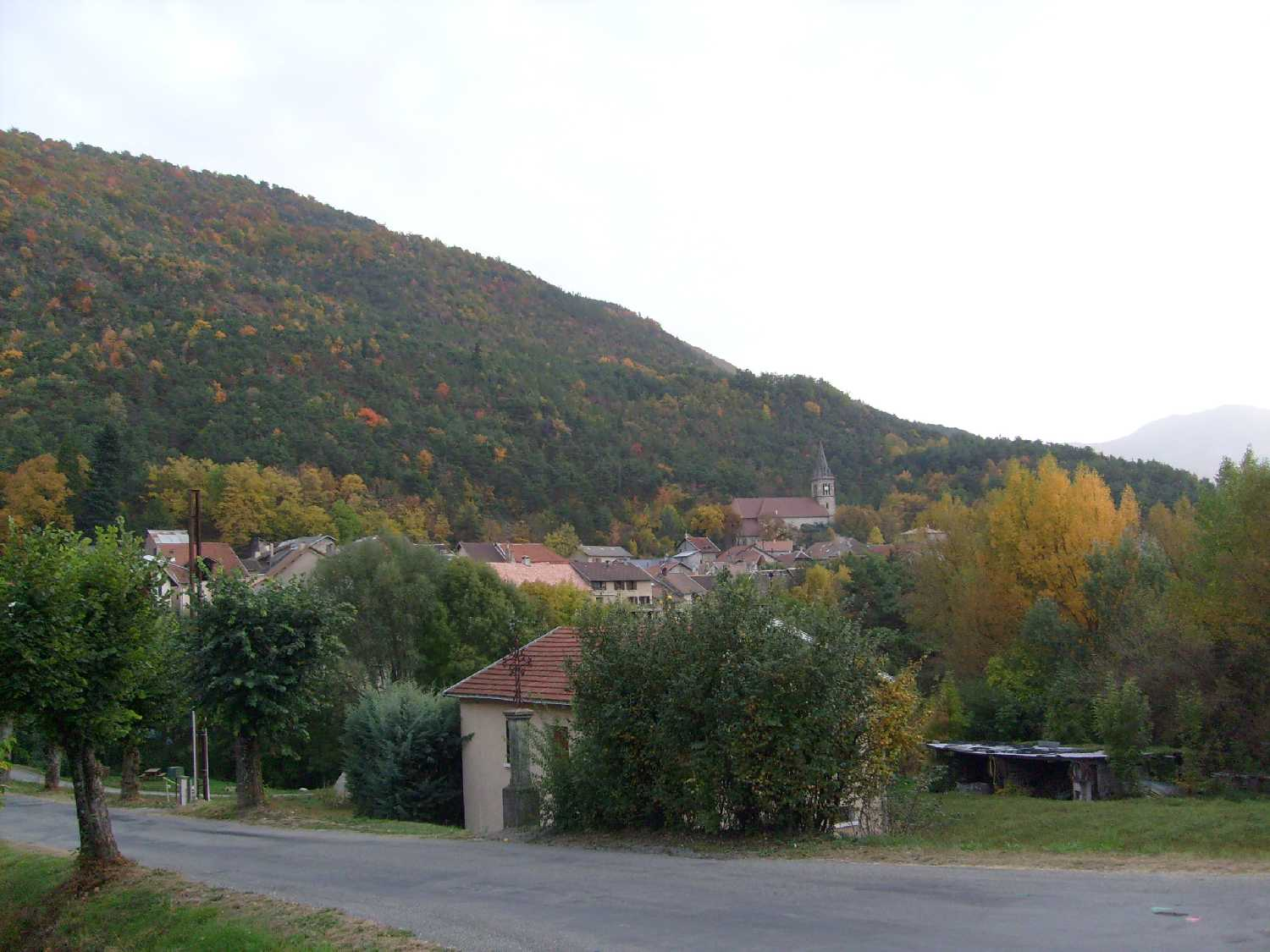
- A general view of Valserres

- Coat of arms
- Location of Valserres
- Location within France Location within Provence-Alpes-Côte d'Azur
- Coordinates: 44°29′23″N 6°07′40″E
- Country: France
- Region: Provence-Alpes-Côte d'Azur
- Department: Hautes-Alpes
- Arrondissement: Gap
- Canton: Tallard

Government
  - Mayor (2026–32): Jean Sarret
- Area^{1}: 11.92 km^{2} (4.60 sq mi)
- Elevation: 662 m (2,172 ft)
- Highest elevation: 1,410 m (4,630 ft)
- Lowest elevation: 608 m (1,995 ft)
- Population (2023): 289
  - Density: 24.2/km^{2} (62.8/sq mi)
- Time zone: UTC+01:00 (CET)
  - Summer (DST): UTC+02:00 (CEST)
- INSEE/Postal code: 05176 /05130
- ^{1} French Land Register data, which excludes lakes, ponds, glaciers > 1 km^{2} (0.386 sq mi or 247 acres) and river estuaries.

Valserres (French pronunciation: [valsɛʁ]; Occitan: Vauserres) is a commune in the Hautes-Alpes department in southeastern France.

== Population ==
Historical population
Year	Pop.	±% p.a.
1968	212	—
1975	149	−4.91%
1982	148	−0.10%
1990	164	+1.29%
1999	192	+1.77%
2007	211	+1.19%
2012	239	+2.52%
2017	261	+1.78%
2023	289	+1.71%
Source: INSEE

== See also ==
- Communes of the Hautes-Alpes department
