= Esparron, Hautes-Alpes =

Esparron
- Commune
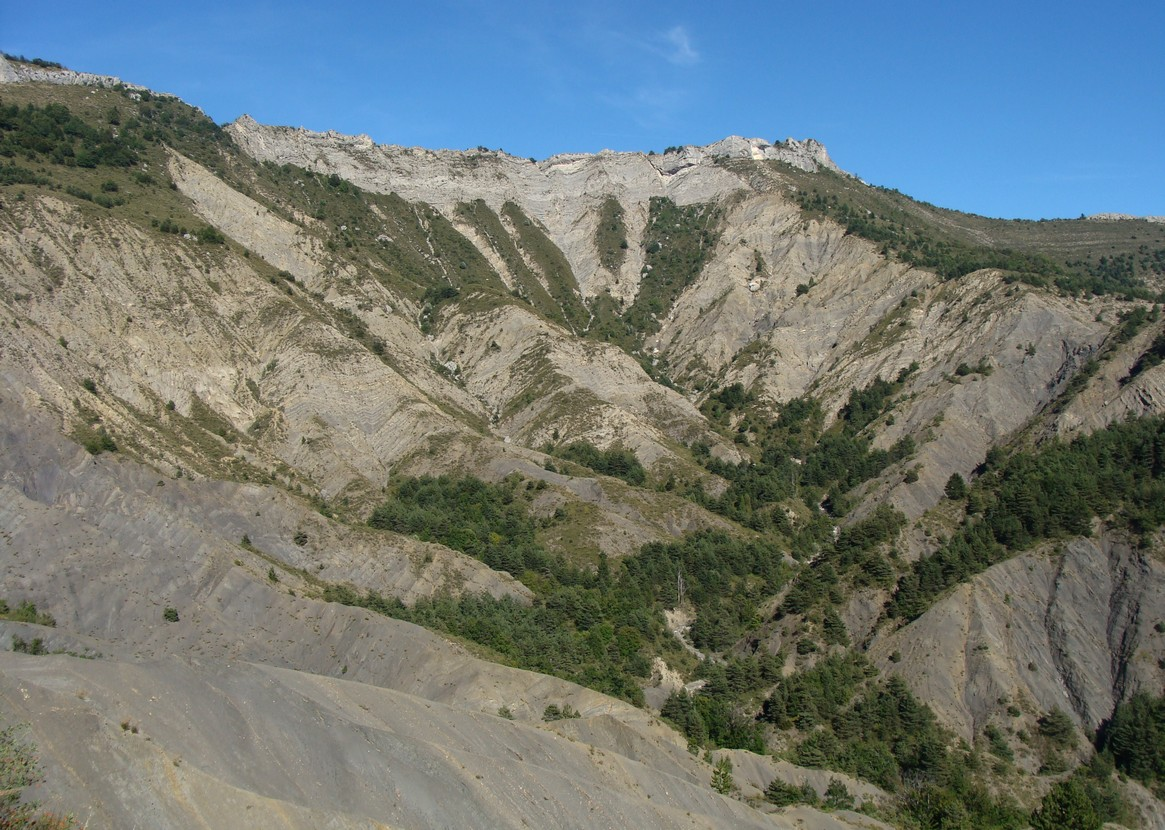

- Coat of arms
- Location of Esparron
- Location within France Location within Provence-Alpes-Côte d'Azur
- Coordinates: 44°27′16″N 5°54′13″E
- Country: France
- Region: Provence-Alpes-Côte d'Azur
- Department: Hautes-Alpes
- Arrondissement: Gap
- Canton: Tallard
- Intercommunality: CA Gap-Tallard-Durance

Government
  - Mayor (2026–32): Patrick Allec
- Area^{1}: 24.11 km^{2} (9.31 sq mi)
- Elevation: 975 m (3,199 ft)
- Highest elevation: 1,830 m (6,000 ft)
- Lowest elevation: 795 m (2,608 ft)
- Population (2023): 53
  - Density: 2.2/km^{2} (5.7/sq mi)
- Time zone: UTC+01:00 (CET)
  - Summer (DST): UTC+02:00 (CEST)
- INSEE/Postal code: 05049 /05110
- ^{1} French Land Register data, which excludes lakes, ponds, glaciers > 1 km^{2} (0.386 sq mi or 247 acres) and river estuaries.

Esparron (French pronunciation: [ɛspaʁɔ̃]) is a commune in the Hautes-Alpes department in southeastern France.

== Population ==
Historical population
| Year | Pop. | ±% p.a. |
|---|---|---|
| 1968 | 48 | — |
| 1975 | 34 | −4.81% |
| 1982 | 30 | −1.77% |
| 1990 | 28 | −0.86% |
| 1999 | 27 | −0.40% |
| 2007 | 35 | +3.30% |
| 2012 | 39 | +2.19% |
| 2017 | 51 | +5.51% |
| 2023 | 53 | +0.64% |
Source: INSEE

== See also ==
- Communes of the Hautes-Alpes department
