= Communauté d'agglomération Gap-Tallard-Durance =

Gap-Tallard-Durance
- Communauté d'agglomération
- Interactive map of Gap-Tallard-Durance
- Coordinates: 44°30′N 06°02′E
- Country: France
- Region: Provence-Alpes-Côte d'Azur
- Department: Alpes-de-Haute-Provence, Hautes-Alpes
- No. of communes: {{{nbcomm}}}
- Established: 2017
- Area: 351.4 km^{2} (135.7 sq mi)
- Population (2019): 50,483
  - Density: 143.7/km^{2} (372.1/sq mi)
- Website: www.gap-tallard-durance.fr

Communauté d'agglomération Gap-Tallard-Durance is the communauté d'agglomération, an intercommunal structure, centred on the city of Gap. It is located in the Hautes-Alpes and Alpes-de-Haute-Provence departments, in the Provence-Alpes-Côte d'Azur region, southeastern France. Created in 2017, its seat is in Gap. Its area is 351.4 km^{2}. Its population was 50,483 in 2019, of which 40,631 in Gap proper.

== Composition ==
The communauté d'agglomération consists of the following 17 communes, of which two (Claret and Curbans) in the Alpes-de-Haute-Provence department:

1. Barcillonnette
2. Châteauvieux
3. Claret
4. Curbans
5. Esparron
6. Fouillouse
7. La Freissinouse
8. Gap
9. Jarjayes
10. Lardier-et-Valença
11. Lettret
12. Neffes
13. Pelleautier
14. La Saulce
15. Sigoyer
16. Tallard
17. Vitrolles
