= Château de La Bâtie-Seyssel =

Castle in Auvergne-Rhône-Alpes, France

Coordinates: 45°34′46″N 5°59′04″E

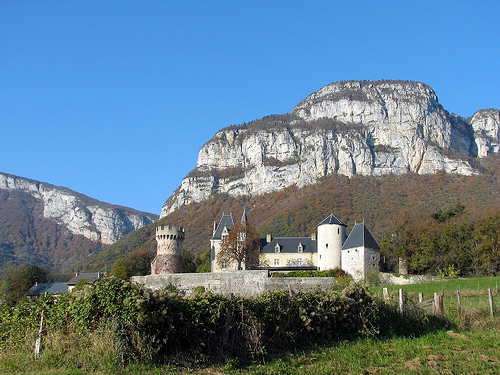
General view of Château de La Bâtie-Seyssel

The Château de La Bâtie-Seyssel is a castle in the commune of Barby in the Savoie département of France.

== Position ==
The castle was built at the foot of Mont Pennay, on a rocky outcrop, in a bend of the Leysse river.

== History ==
From the start of the feudal era, it was the property of the Seyssel family. In the 13th century, on the death of Humbert III, lord of Aix and Bordeau, it was inherited by the younger son, Hugues, while the elder received the fortress of Aix. With the death of the last of the cadet branch, in 1517, the Château de La Bâtie reverted to the lords of Aix. At the death of Maurice de Seyssel, marquis of Aix and La Chambre on 14 May 1660, the fief of La Bâtie passed to Jacques d'Allinges, who sold it in 1679 to François d'Oncieu (President of the Cour des Comptes, Baron of Saint-Denis, Chaffardon, and la Batie, lord of Genissia, Senator at the Savoy Senate). His family's lands at La Bâtie became a marquisate in 1699.

== Description ==
The Château de La Bâtie-Seyssel comprises two fortified enceintes, surrounding a residential building. The main access is through three successive gateways. The first has kept its ogival arcade and the vault supporting the guard room. The second gateway was altered in the 17th century to a semicircular arch; it is framed by two towers. The residence is a restoration in the style of the 15th century. The chapel dates from the 15th century and houses Roman mosaics from the 4th century, discovered at Arbin.

The Château de la Bâtie, its terrace and the lower floor which became the great hall, the chimney in the guard room and the Gallo-Roman mosaics, were listed on 6 April 1972 as a monument historique by the French Ministry of Culture. It is private property.

== See also ==
- List of castles in France

== Bibliography ==
- Georges Chapier, Les Châteaux savoyards, Éd. La Découvrance, 2005, p. 201-202.
- Michèle Brocard, Les Châteaux de Savoie, Éd. Cabédita, 1995, p. 48-49.
