= Avançon, Hautes-Alpes =

Avançon
- Commune
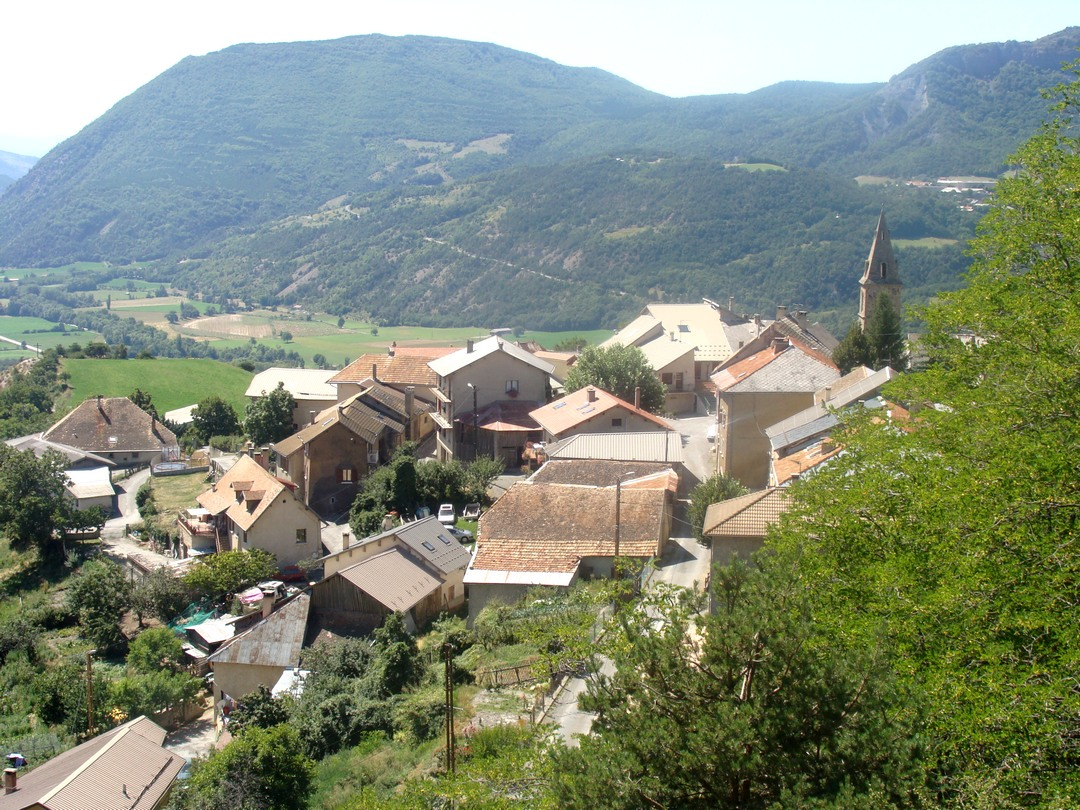
- A general view of the village of Avançon

- Coat of arms
- Location of Avançon
- Location within France Location within Provence-Alpes-Côte d'Azur
- Coordinates: 44°31′35″N 6°11′10″E
- Country: France
- Region: Provence-Alpes-Côte d'Azur
- Department: Hautes-Alpes
- Arrondissement: Gap
- Canton: Tallard
- Intercommunality: Serre-Ponçon Val d'Avance

Government
  - Mayor (2026–32): Frédéric Cavallino
- Area^{1}: 22.57 km^{2} (8.71 sq mi)
- Elevation: 900 m (3,000 ft)
- Highest elevation: 1,629 m (5,344 ft)
- Lowest elevation: 718 m (2,356 ft)
- Population (2023): 415
  - Density: 18.4/km^{2} (47.6/sq mi)
- Time zone: UTC+01:00 (CET)
  - Summer (DST): UTC+02:00 (CEST)
- INSEE/Postal code: 05011 /05230
- ^{1} French Land Register data, which excludes lakes, ponds, glaciers > 1 km^{2} (0.386 sq mi or 247 acres) and river estuaries.

Avançon (French pronunciation: [avɑ̃sɔ̃]) is a commune in the Hautes-Alpes department in southeastern France.

== Population ==
Historical population
Year	Pop.	±% p.a.
1968	252	—
1975	219	−1.99%
1982	261	+2.54%
1990	279	+0.84%
1999	330	+1.88%
2007	346	+0.59%
2012	407	+3.30%
2017	404	−0.15%
2023	415	+0.45%
Source: INSEE

== See also ==
- Communes of the Hautes-Alpes department
