= Vitrolles, Hautes-Alpes =

Vitrolles
- Commune
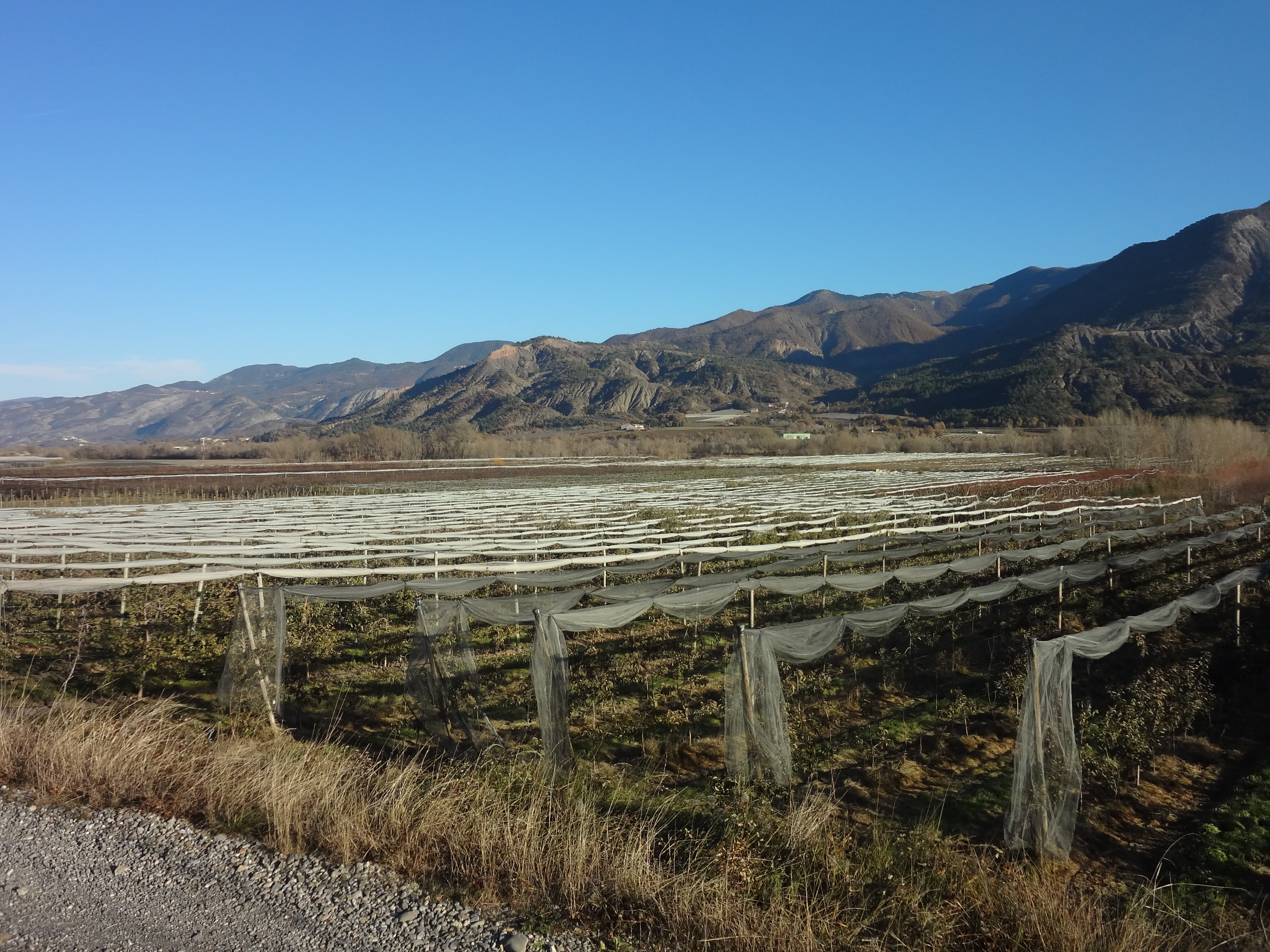
- Orchards

- Coat of arms
- Location of Vitrolles
- Location within France Location within Provence-Alpes-Côte d'Azur
- Coordinates: 44°24′47″N 5°57′17″E
- Country: France
- Region: Provence-Alpes-Côte d'Azur
- Department: Hautes-Alpes
- Arrondissement: Gap
- Canton: Tallard
- Intercommunality: CA Gap-Tallard-Durance

Government
  - Mayor (2026–32): Claudie Joubert
- Area^{1}: 14.62 km^{2} (5.64 sq mi)
- Elevation: 760 m (2,490 ft)
- Highest elevation: 1,455 m (4,774 ft)
- Lowest elevation: 545 m (1,788 ft)
- Population (2023): 221
  - Density: 15.1/km^{2} (39.2/sq mi)
- Time zone: UTC+01:00 (CET)
  - Summer (DST): UTC+02:00 (CEST)
- INSEE/Postal code: 05184 /05110
- ^{1} French Land Register data, which excludes lakes, ponds, glaciers > 1 km^{2} (0.386 sq mi or 247 acres) and river estuaries.

Vitrolles (French pronunciation: [vitʁɔl]; Occitan: Vitròla) is a commune in the Hautes-Alpes department in southeastern France.

== Geography ==
=== Climate ===
Vitrolles has an oceanic climate (Köppen climate classification Cfb). The average annual temperature in Vitrolles is 11.8 °C (53.2 °F). The average annual rainfall is 763.6 mm (30.06 in) with October as the wettest month. The temperatures are highest on average in July, at around 21.1 °C (70.0 °F), and lowest in January, at around 2.6 °C (36.7 °F). The highest temperature ever recorded in Vitrolles was 38.6 °C (101.5 °F) on 12 August 2003; the coldest temperature ever recorded was −15.1 °C (4.8 °F) on 7 February 2012.

Climate data for Vitrolles (1981–2010 averages, extremes 1997−2012)
Month	Jan	Feb	Mar	Apr	May	Jun	Jul	Aug	Sep	Oct	Nov	Dec	Year
Record high °C (°F)	21.8 (71.2)	21.3 (70.3)	26.2 (79.2)	30.2 (86.4)	32.0 (89.6)	36.0 (96.8)	36.2 (97.2)	38.6 (101.5)	32.9 (91.2)	30.0 (86.0)	21.2 (70.2)	18.3 (64.9)	38.6 (101.5)
Mean daily maximum °C (°F)	7.9 (46.2)	10.5 (50.9)	14.9 (58.8)	17.7 (63.9)	22.4 (72.3)	26.7 (80.1)	29.1 (84.4)	28.7 (83.7)	23.9 (75.0)	18.8 (65.8)	12.1 (53.8)	7.8 (46.0)	18.4 (65.1)
Daily mean °C (°F)	2.6 (36.7)	4.2 (39.6)	8.0 (46.4)	10.9 (51.6)	15.3 (59.5)	19.1 (66.4)	21.1 (70.0)	20.9 (69.6)	16.9 (62.4)	12.6 (54.7)	6.7 (44.1)	2.9 (37.2)	11.8 (53.2)
Mean daily minimum °C (°F)	−2.7 (27.1)	−2.1 (28.2)	1.2 (34.2)	4.0 (39.2)	8.3 (46.9)	11.6 (52.9)	13.2 (55.8)	13.2 (55.8)	9.8 (49.6)	6.4 (43.5)	1.3 (34.3)	−2.0 (28.4)	5.2 (41.4)
Record low °C (°F)	−11.7 (10.9)	−15.1 (4.8)	−11.7 (10.9)	−3.3 (26.1)	−0.7 (30.7)	1.8 (35.2)	5.4 (41.7)	5.5 (41.9)	1.8 (35.2)	−4.4 (24.1)	−9.2 (15.4)	−13.5 (7.7)	−15.1 (4.8)
Average precipitation mm (inches)	57.5 (2.26)	44.6 (1.76)	52.8 (2.08)	72.3 (2.85)	67.6 (2.66)	49.3 (1.94)	31.2 (1.23)	44.0 (1.73)	79.1 (3.11)	101.3 (3.99)	91.7 (3.61)	72.2 (2.84)	763.6 (30.06)
Average precipitation days (≥ 1.0 mm)	6.8	4.6	6.9	8.4	8.2	5.8	4.6	5.1	5.6	7.9	8.1	7.4	79.4
Source: Meteociel

== Population ==
Historical population
Year	Pop.	±% p.a.
1968	182	—
1975	155	−2.27%
1982	137	−1.75%
1990	134	−0.28%
1999	139	+0.41%
2007	204	+4.91%
2012	204	+0.00%
2017	204	+0.00%
2023	221	+1.34%
Source: INSEE

== See also ==
- Communes of the Hautes-Alpes department
