= Rambaud, Hautes-Alpes =

Rambaud
- Commune
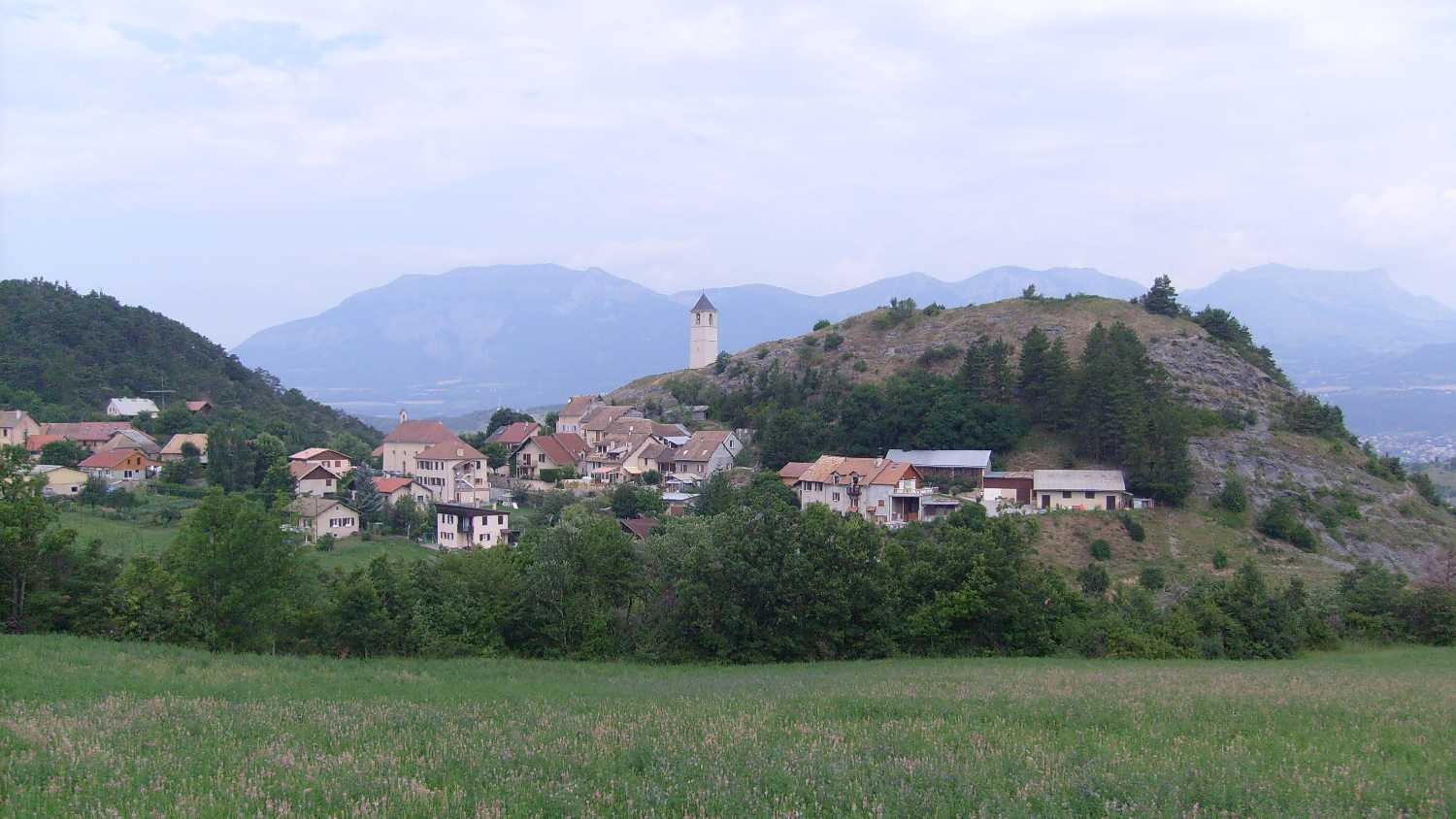
- A general view of the village of Rambaud

- Coat of arms
- Location of Rambaud
- Location within France Location within Provence-Alpes-Côte d'Azur
- Coordinates: 44°32′45″N 6°07′59″E
- Country: France
- Region: Provence-Alpes-Côte d'Azur
- Department: Hautes-Alpes
- Arrondissement: Gap
- Canton: Tallard

Government
  - Mayor (2026–32): Lionel Roux
- Area^{1}: 10.71 km^{2} (4.14 sq mi)
- Elevation: 950 m (3,120 ft)
- Highest elevation: 1,260 m (4,130 ft)
- Lowest elevation: 793 m (2,602 ft)
- Population (2023): 423
  - Density: 39.5/km^{2} (102/sq mi)
- Time zone: UTC+01:00 (CET)
  - Summer (DST): UTC+02:00 (CEST)
- INSEE/Postal code: 05113 /05000
- ^{1} French Land Register data, which excludes lakes, ponds, glaciers > 1 km^{2} (0.386 sq mi or 247 acres) and river estuaries.

Rambaud (French pronunciation: [ʁɑ̃bo]) is a commune in the Hautes-Alpes department in southeastern France.

== Population ==
Historical population
Year	Pop.	±% p.a.
1968	182	—
1975	218	+2.61%
1982	271	+3.16%
1990	294	+1.02%
1999	279	−0.58%
2007	354	+3.02%
2012	364	+0.56%
2017	376	+0.65%
2023	423	+1.98%
Source: INSEE

== See also ==
- Communes of the Hautes-Alpes department
