= La Bâtie-Neuve =

- Commune
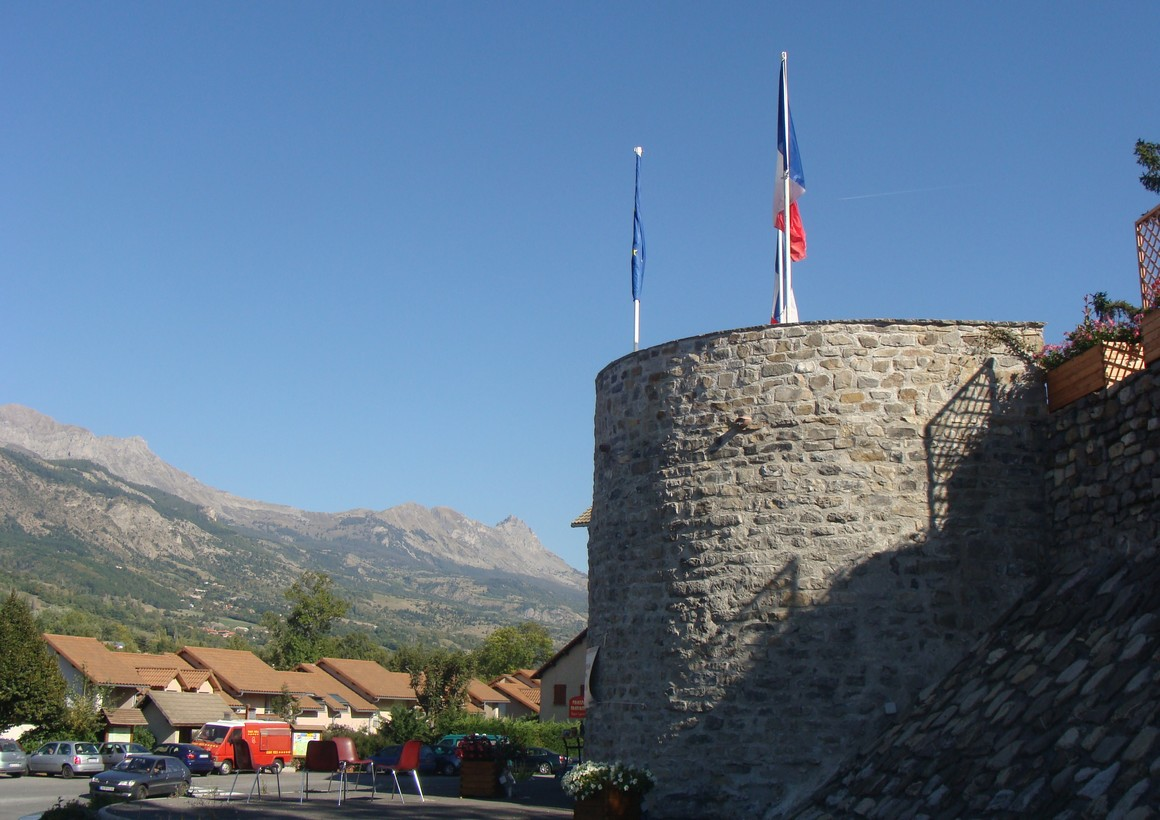
- The tower, the only remains of the ancient castle of La Bâtie-Neuve

- Coat of arms
- Location of La Bâtie-Neuve
- Location within France Location within Provence-Alpes-Côte d'Azur
- Coordinates: 44°34′03″N 6°11′47″E
- Country: France
- Region: Provence-Alpes-Côte d'Azur
- Department: Hautes-Alpes
- Arrondissement: Gap
- Canton: Chorges

Government
  - Mayor (2026–32): Joël Bonnafoux
- Area^{1}: 27.99 km^{2} (10.81 sq mi)
- Elevation: 855 m (2,805 ft)
- Highest elevation: 2,420 m (7,940 ft)
- Lowest elevation: 824 m (2,703 ft)
- Population (2023): 2,628
  - Density: 93.89/km^{2} (243.2/sq mi)
- Time zone: UTC+01:00 (CET)
  - Summer (DST): UTC+02:00 (CEST)
- INSEE/Postal code: 05017 /05230
- ^{1} French Land Register data, which excludes lakes, ponds, glaciers > 1 km^{2} (0.386 sq mi or 247 acres) and river estuaries.

La Bâtie-Neuve (French pronunciation: [la bati nœv]; Occitan: La Bastia Nòva) is a commune in the Hautes-Alpes department in southeastern France.

== Location ==
The village is 5 km (3.1 mi) away from La Bâtie-Vieille. It is close to Gap.

== Population ==
Historical population

Year	Pop.	±% p.a.
1793	808	—
1800	794	−0.25%
1806	851	+1.16%
1821	716	−1.14%
1831	855	+1.79%
1836	821	−0.81%
1841	830	+0.22%
1846	905	+1.75%
1851	851	−1.22%
1856	840	−0.26%
1861	767	−1.80%
1866	798	+0.80%
1872	766	−0.68%
1876	773	+0.23%
1881	947	+4.14%
1886	820	−2.84%
1891	752	−1.72%
1896	694	−1.59%
1901	656	−1.12%

Year	Pop.	±% p.a.
1906	623	−1.03%
1911	620	−0.10%
1921	554	−1.12%
1926	608	+1.88%
1931	573	−1.18%
1936	638	+2.17%
1946	518	−2.06%
1954	474	−1.10%
1962	528	+1.36%
1968	510	−0.58%
1975	627	+2.99%
1982	837	+4.21%
1990	1,327	+5.93%
1999	1,687	+2.70%
2007	2,019	+2.27%
2012	2,420	+3.69%
2017	2,534	+0.92%
2023	2,628	+0.61%

Source: EHESS and INSEE (1968-2023)

== See also ==
- Communes of the Hautes-Alpes department
