= Barcillonnette =

- Commune
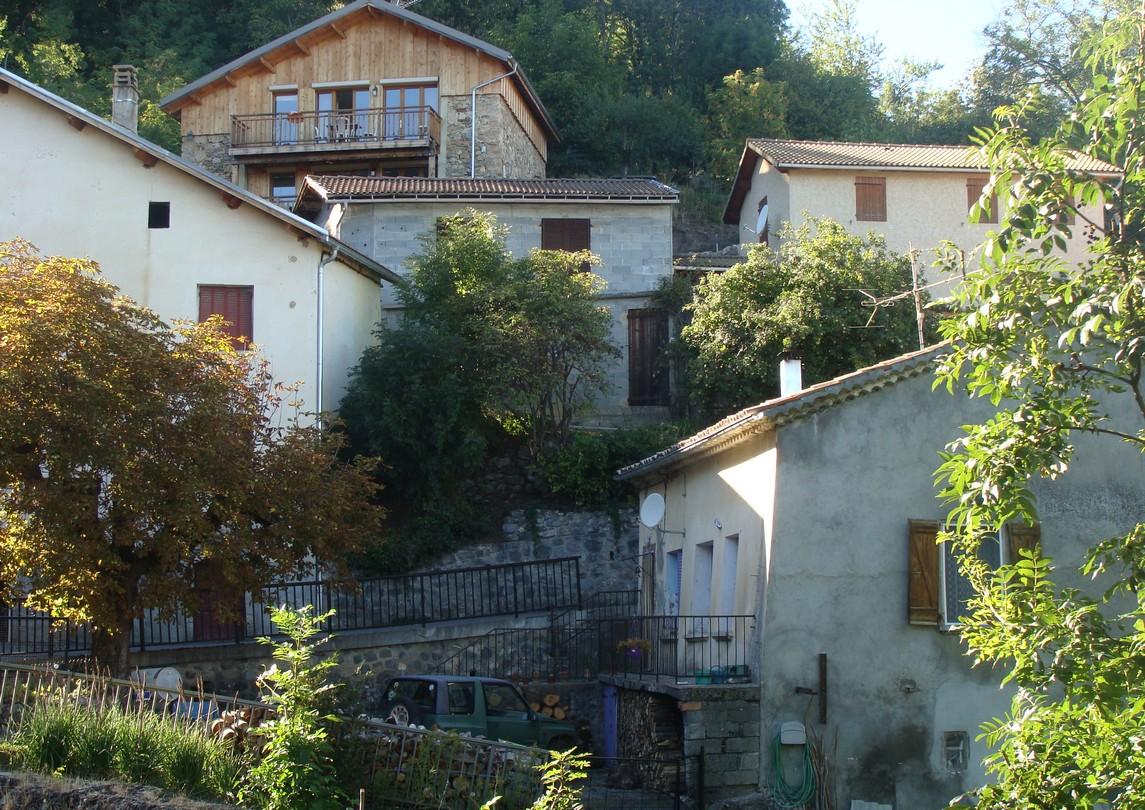

- Coat of arms
- Location of Barcillonnette
- Location within France Location within Provence-Alpes-Côte d'Azur
- Coordinates: 44°26′10″N 5°55′11″E
- Country: France
- Region: Provence-Alpes-Côte d'Azur
- Department: Hautes-Alpes
- Arrondissement: Gap
- Canton: Tallard
- Intercommunality: CA Gap-Tallard-Durance

Government
  - Mayor (2026–32): Rémina Salerno
- Area^{1}: 19.51 km^{2} (7.53 sq mi)
- Elevation: 830 m (2,720 ft)
- Highest elevation: 1,560 m (5,120 ft)
- Lowest elevation: 691 m (2,267 ft)
- Population (2023): 148
  - Density: 7.59/km^{2} (19.6/sq mi)
- Time zone: UTC+01:00 (CET)
  - Summer (DST): UTC+02:00 (CEST)
- INSEE/Postal code: 05013 /05110
- ^{1} French Land Register data, which excludes lakes, ponds, glaciers > 1 km^{2} (0.386 sq mi or 247 acres) and river estuaries.

Barcillonnette (French pronunciation: [baʁsilɔnɛt]; Occitan: Barciloneta de Vitròla) is a commune in the Hautes-Alpes department in southeastern France.

== Population ==
Historical population
Year	Pop.	±% p.a.
1968	88	—
1975	88	+0.00%
1982	83	−0.83%
1990	102	+2.61%
1999	104	+0.22%
2007	125	+2.33%
2012	147	+3.30%
2017	136	−1.54%
2023	148	+1.42%
Source: INSEE

== See also ==
- Communes of the Hautes-Alpes department
