= Manteyer =

Manteyer Manteier (Occitan)
- Commune
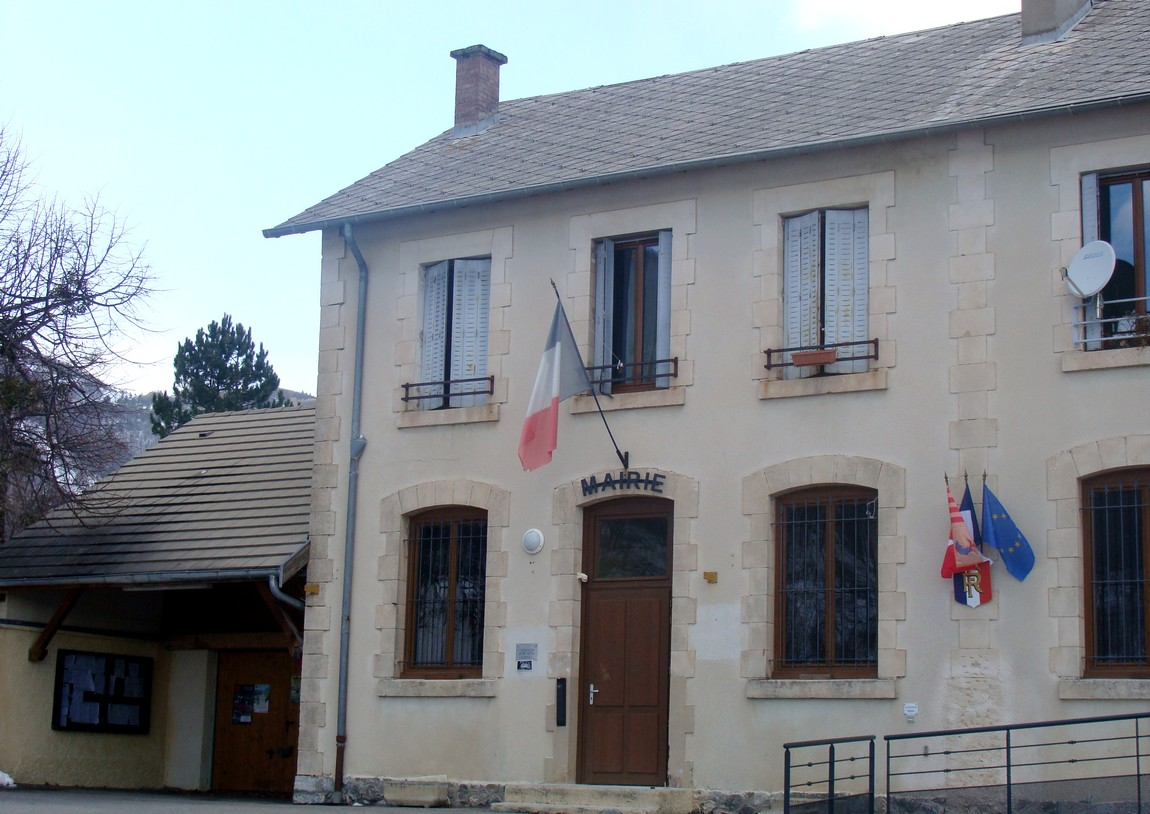
- Manteyer Town Hall

- Coat of arms
- Location of Manteyer
- Location within France Location within Provence-Alpes-Côte d'Azur
- Coordinates: 44°32′19″N 5°57′53″E
- Country: France
- Region: Provence-Alpes-Côte d'Azur
- Department: Hautes-Alpes
- Arrondissement: Gap
- Canton: Veynes
- Intercommunality: Buëch Dévoluy

Government
  - Mayor (2026–32): Frederic Rey
- Area^{1}: 25.63 km^{2} (9.90 sq mi)
- Elevation: 1,040 m (3,410 ft)
- Highest elevation: 1,974 m (6,476 ft)
- Lowest elevation: 890 m (2,920 ft)
- Population (2023): 500
  - Density: 20/km^{2} (51/sq mi)
- Demonym: Manteyards
- Time zone: UTC+01:00 (CET)
  - Summer (DST): UTC+02:00 (CEST)
- INSEE/Postal code: 05075 /05400
- Website: www.manteyer-mairie.fr
- ^{1} French Land Register data, which excludes lakes, ponds, glaciers > 1 km^{2} (0.386 sq mi or 247 acres) and river estuaries.

Manteyer (French pronunciation: [mɑ̃tɛje]; Occitan: Manteier) is a commune in the Hautes-Alpes department of the Provence-Alpes-Côte d'Azur region in Southeastern France.

== Demographics ==
Historical population
Year	Pop.	±% p.a.
1968	200	—
1975	178	−1.65%
1982	211	+2.46%
1990	222	+0.64%
1999	305	+3.59%
2007	400	+3.45%
2012	423	+1.12%
2017	429	+0.28%
2023	500	+2.59%
Source: INSEE

Its inhabitants are called Manteyards in French.

== See also ==
- Communes of the Hautes-Alpes department
