= Canton of Tallard =

Coordinates: 44°27′45″N 6°03′19″E

Tallard
- Canton
- Country: France
- Region: Provence-Alpes-Côte d'Azur
- Department: Hautes-Alpes
- No. of communes: {{{nbcomm}}}
- Area: 253.97 km^{2} (98.06 sq mi)
- Population (2023): 11,149
  - Density: 43.899/km^{2} (113.70/sq mi)
- INSEE code: 05 14

The canton of Tallard is an administrative division in southeastern France. At the French canton reorganisation which came into effect in March 2015, the canton was expanded from 9 to 19 communes:

- Avançon
- Barcillonnette
- La Bâtie-Vieille
- Châteauvieux
- Esparron
- Fouillouse
- La Freissinouse
- Jarjayes
- Lardier-et-Valença
- Lettret
- Neffes
- Pelleautier
- Rambaud
- Saint-Étienne-le-Laus
- La Saulce
- Sigoyer
- Tallard
- Valserres
- Vitrolles

== Demographics ==
Historical population
Year	Pop.	±% p.a.
2013	9,832	—
2018	10,566	+1.45%
Source: INSEE

== See also ==
- Cantons of the Hautes-Alpes department
- Communes of France
