= List of deputies from Hautes-Alpes =

This list shows all deputies to the National Assembly of France from the Hautes-Alpes department. The current deputies are Pascale Boyer and Joël Giraud.

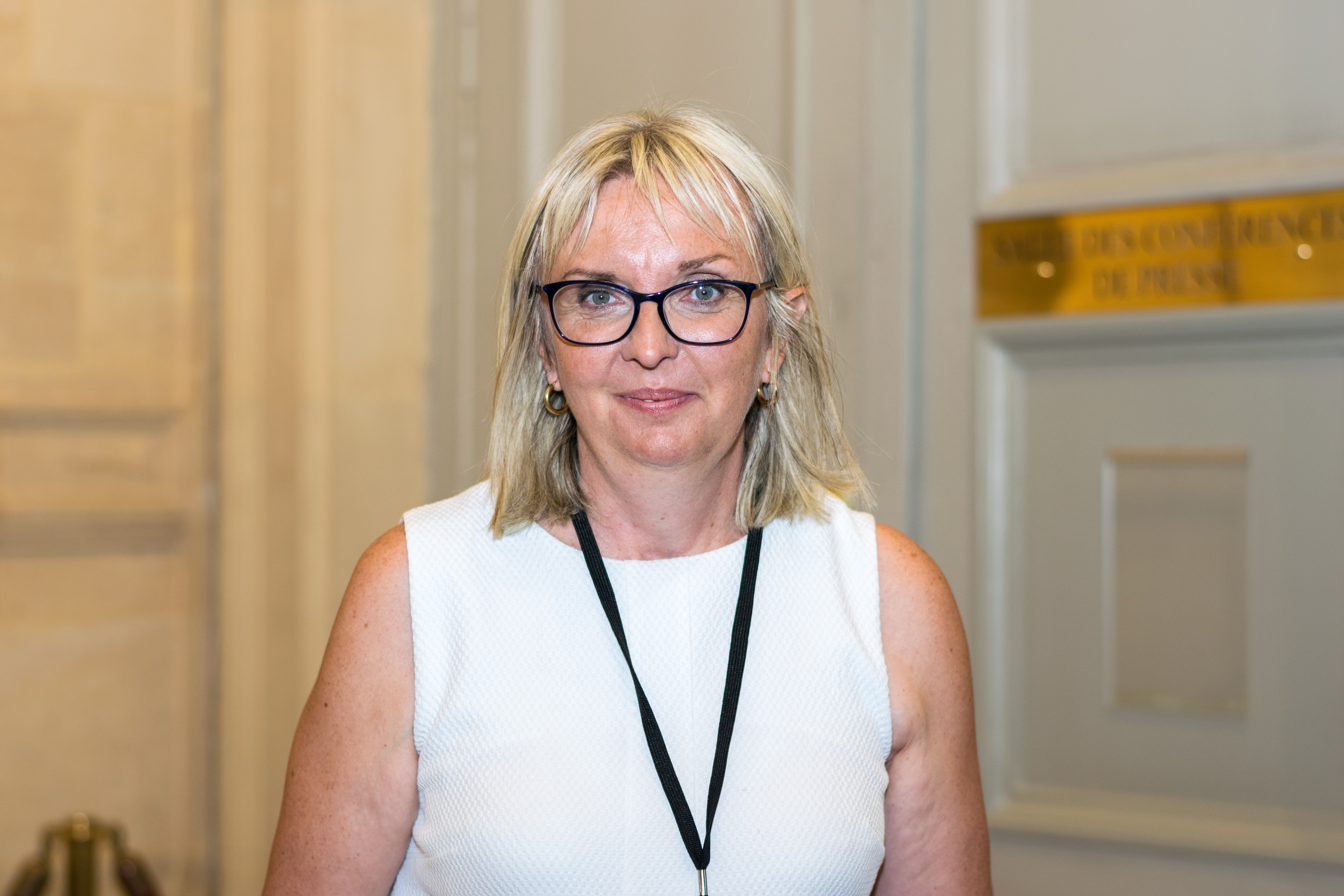
Hautes-Alpes's 1st constituency : Pascale Boyer
LREM

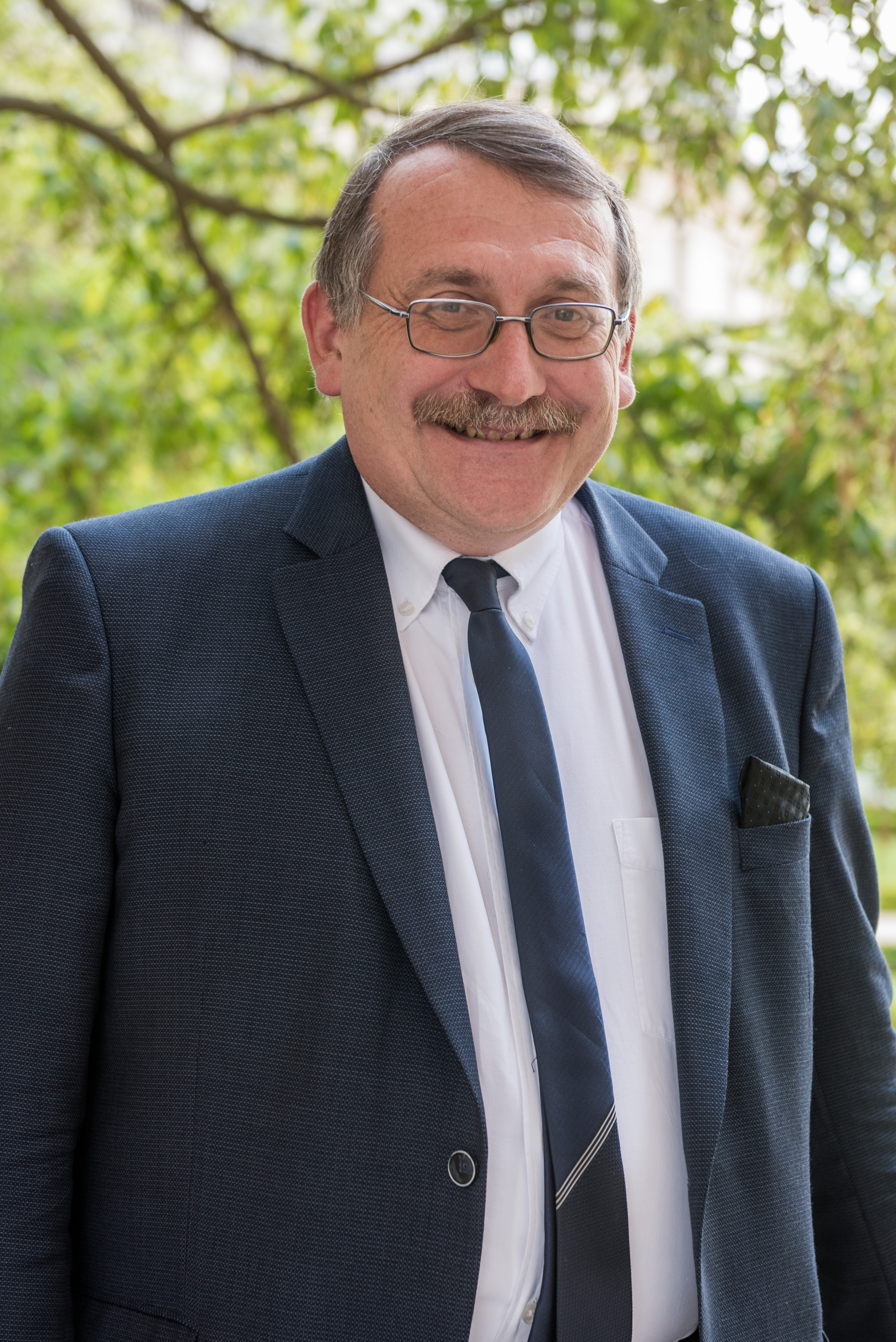
Hautes-Alpes's 2nd constituency : Joël Giraud
app. LREM

== Estates General ==
- Jacques-Bernardin Colaud de La Salcette from the province of Dauphiné

== National Legislative Assembly 1 October 1791 - 20 September 1792 ==
- Claude-Simon Amat
- Joseph Dongois
- Pierre Faure-Lacombe
- Guillaume Ferrus
- Jean Labastie

== Convention nationale 21 September 1792 - 26 October 1795 ==
- Ignace de Cazeneuve
- Pierre Barrety
- Hyacinthe Borel
- Jean Serres
- Jean-François Izoard

== Conseil des Cinq-Cents 27 October 1795 - 26 December 1799 ==
- Jean-Louis Blanc
- Jacques-Bernardin Colaud de La Salcette
- Pierre Lachau
- Ignace de Cazeneuve
- Hyacinthe Borel
- Jean Serres
- Paul Bontoux
- Jean-François Izoard
- Pierre Nicolas de Meissas

== First Empire ==
=== Corps législatif 1 January 1800 - 4 June 1814 ===
- Jean-Louis Blanc
- Louis Agnel
- Jean-François Bonnot
- Charles Anglès

=== Chambre des représentants 3 June 1815 - 13 July 1815 ===
- Louis Faure
- Joseph Provensal de Lompré
- Jean Barrilon
- Jacques Ardoin

== Chamber of Deputies (2nd restoration) ==
=== 1st legislature ===
- Jules Anglès
- Jean Paul Cyrus Colomb

=== 2nd legislature ===
- Jean-François Anglès
- Honoré Bucelle
- Jean Paul Cyrus Colomb

=== 3rd legislature ===
- Honoré Bucelle
- Jean Paul Cyrus Colomb

=== 4th legislature ===
- Jean Paul Cyrus Colomb
- Jean Joseph Amat

=== 5th legislature ===
- Jean Paul Cyrus Colomb
- Jean Joseph Amat

== Chamber of Deputies (France) (July Monarchy) ==
=== 1st Legislature (1830-1831) ===
- Jean Paul Cyrus Colomb
- Jean Joseph Amat

=== 2nd Legislature (1831-1834) ===
- Pascal Joseph Faure
- Jean-Antoine Allier

=== 3rd Legislature (1834-1837) ===
- Pascal Joseph Faure
- Jean-Antoine Allier

=== 4th Legislature (1837-1839) ===
- Pierre-Louis-Auguste-Bruno Blanc de La Nautte d'Hauterive
- Jacques Ardoin

=== 5th Legislature (1839-1842) ===
- Pierre-Louis-Auguste-Bruno Blanc de La Nautte d'Hauterive
- Antoine Allier

=== 5th Legislature (1842-1846) ===
- Pierre-Louis-Auguste-Bruno Blanc de La Nautte d'Hauterive
- Antoine Allier

=== 5th Legislature (1846-1848) ===
- Ernest Desclozeaux
- Pierre-Louis-Auguste-Bruno Blanc de La Nautte d'Hauterive

== Second Republic ==
Elections by universal male suffrage from 1848

=== National Constituent Assembly (1848-1849) ===
- Calixte Laforgue-Bellegarde
- Pascal Joseph Faure
- Antoine Allier

=== National Legislative Assembly (1849-1851) ===
- Cyprien Chaix
- Pascal Joseph Faure
- Antoine Allier

== Second Empire ==
=== 1st Legislature (1852-1857) ===
- Pascal Joseph Faure

=== 2nd Legislature (1857-1863) ===
- Pascal Joseph Faure

=== 3rd Legislature (1863-1869) ===
- Maurice Désiré Garnier

=== 4th Legislature (1869-1870) ===
- Clément Duvernois

== Third Republic ==
=== National Assembly (1871 - 1876) ===
- Ernest Cézanne
- Louis de Ventavon

=== 1st Legislature (1876 - 1877) ===
- Ernest Cézanne died 1876, replaced by Barthélémy Ferrary
- Cyprien Chaix
- Honoré Chancel

=== 2nd Legislature (1877 - 1881) ===
- Léon Laurençon
- Antoine d'Estienne de Prunières invalid in 1878, replaced by Barthélémy Ferrary
- Paul Eugène Bontoux invalid in 1877, replaced by Cyprien Chaix

=== 3rd Legislature (1881 - 1885) ===
- Léon Laurençon
- Barthélémy Ferrary
- Cyprien Chaix

=== 4th Legislature (1885 - 1889) ===
- Léon Laurençon
- Cyprien Chaix elected Senator in 1888, replaced by Émile Flourens
- Barthélémy Ferrary died in 1886, replaced by Joseph Grimaud

=== 5th Legislature (1889 - 1893) ===
- Léon Laurençon
- Frédéric Euzière
- Émile Flourens

=== 6th Legislature (1893 - 1898) ===
- Léon Laurençon
- Frédéric Euzière
- Émile Flourens

=== VIIth Legislature (1898 - 1902) ===
- Léon Laurençon
- François Pavie
- Frédéric Euzière

=== VIIIth Legislature (1902 - 1906) ===
- Léon Laurençon
- François Pavie
- Frédéric Euzière

=== IXth Legislature (1906 - 1910) ===
- Émile Merle
- Victor Bonniard
- Frédéric Euzière

=== Xth Legislature (1910 - 1914) ===
- Maurice Toy-Riont
- Antoine Blanc elected Senator in 1912, replaced by Victor Peytral
- Victor Bonniard

=== XIth Legislature (1914 - 1919) ===
- Victor Peytral
- François Gilbert Planche
- Victor Bonniard

=== XIIth Legislature (1919 - 1924) ===
The legislative elections of 1919 were organised by proportional list voting. They marked the national victory of the centre-right National Bloc.

- Maurice de Rothschild
- Paul Caillat
- Georges Noblemaire died in 1923
- Victor Bonniard elected Senator in 1921, replaced by François Gilbert Planche

=== XIIIth Legislature (1924 - 1928) ===
The legislative elections of 1919 were organised by proportional list voting. They marked the national victory of the Cartel of the Left

- Léon Cornand replaced by Maurice Petsche
- Maurice de Rothschild
- Louis Cluzel

=== XIVth Legislature (1928 - 1932) ===
Legislative elections were by majority rounding ballot in two rounds from 1928 to 1936.

- Maurice Petsche
- Maurice de Rothschild elected Senator of 1930, replaced by Ernest Grimaud
- Ernest Lafont

=== XVth Legislature (1932 - 1936) ===
- Maurice Petsche
- Ernest Grimaud
- Ernest Lafont

=== XVIth Legislature (1936 - 1940) ===
- Jean Michard-Pellissier
- Maurice Petsche
- Auguste Muret

== Fourth Republic ==
=== 1st constituent assembly ===
- Louis Richier
- Gaston Julian

=== 2nd constituent assembly ===
- Gaston Julian
- Maurice Petsche

=== 1st legislature (1946-51) ===
- Gaston Julian
- Maurice Petsche

=== 2nd legislature (1951-1956) ===
- Maurice Petsche (died in 1951)
- Marie François-Bénard
- Jean Aubin

=== 3rd legislature (1956-1958) ===
- Marie François-Bénard
- Gaston Julian

== Fifth Republic ==
=== 1st legislature (1958-1962) ===
Constituency	deputy	party	term start	term end	notes
1st	Robert Lecourt	DVD	9 December 1958	8 February 1959	Appointed to the Government
1st	Armand Barniaudy	DVD	9 February 1959	9 October 1962	
2nd	Robert Garraud	UNR	9 December 1958	9 October 1962	

=== 2nd legislature (1962-1967) ===
Constituency	deputy	party	term start	term end	notes
1st	Armand Barniaudy	MRP	6 December 1962		
2nd	Marie François-Bénard	DVG	6 December 1962		

=== 3rd legislature (1967-1968) ===
Constituency	deputy	party	term start	term end	notes
1st	Émile Didier	PR	3 April 1967	30 May 1968	
2nd	Paul Dijoud	RI	3 April 1967	30 May 1968	

=== 4th legislature (1968-1973) ===
Constituency	deputy	party	term start	term end	notes
1st	Émile Didier	PR	11 July 1968	26 September 1971	Démission
1st	Pierre Bernard-Reymond	DVD	5 December 1971	1 April 1973	by-election
2nd	Paul Dijoud	RI	11 July 1968	1 April 1973	

=== 5th legislature (1973-1978) ===
Constituency	deputy	party	term start	term end	notes
1st	Pierre Bernard-Reymond	CDP	2 April 1973	1 May 1977	Appointed to the Government
1st	René Serres	CDP	2 May 1977	2 April 1978	
2nd	Paul Dijoud	RI	2 April 1973	13 May 1973	Appointed to the Government
2nd	Marcel Papet	RI	14 May 1973	2 April 1978	

=== 6th legislature (1978-1981) ===
Constituency	deputy	party	term start	term end	notes
1st	Pierre Bernard-Reymond	UDF	3 April 1978	11 September 1978	Appointed to the Government
1st	René Serres	UDF	12 September 1978	22 May 1981	
2nd	Paul Dijoud	UDF	3 April 1978	7 May 1978	Appointed to the Government
2nd	Marcel Papet	UDF	8 May 1978	22 May 1981	

=== 7th legislature (1981-1986) ===
Constituency	deputy	party	term start	term end	notes
1st	Daniel Chevallier	PS	2 July 1981	1 April 1986	
2nd	Robert de Caumont	PS	2 July 1981	1 April 1986	

=== 8th legislature (1986-1988) ===
2 deputies, elected via proportional representation.

- Pierre Bernard-Reymond (UDF)
- Daniel Chevallier (PS)

=== 9th legislature (1988-1993) ===
Constituency	deputy	party	term start	term end	notes
1st	Daniel Chevallier	PS	23 June 1988	1 April 1993	
2nd	Patrick Ollier	RPR	23 June 1988	1 April 1993	

=== 10th legislature (1993-1997) ===
Constituency	deputy	party	term start	term end	notes
1st	Henriette Martinez	RPR	2 April 1993	21 April 1997	
2nd	Patrick Ollier	RPR	2 April 1993	21 April 1997	

=== 11th legislature (1997-2002) ===
Constituency	deputy	party	term start	term end	notes
1st	Daniel Chevallier	PS	1 June 1997	18 June 2002	
2nd	Patrick Ollier	RPR	1 June 1997	18 June 2002	

=== 12th legislature (2002-2007) ===
Constituency	deputy	party	term start	term end	notes
1st	Henriette Martinez	RPR then UMP	19 June 2002	19 June 2007	
2nd	Joël Giraud	PRG	19 June 2002	19 June 2007	

=== 13th legislature (2007-2012) ===
Constituency	deputy	party	term start	term end	notes
1st	Henriette Martinez	UMP	20 June 2007	19 June 2012	
2nd	Joël Giraud	PRG	20 June 2007	19 June 2012	

=== 14th legislature (2012-2017) ===
Constituency	deputy	party	term start	term end	notes
1st	Karine Berger	PS	20 June 2012	18 June 2017	
2nd	Joël Giraud	PRG	20 June 2012	18 June 2017	

=== 15th legislature (2017-2022) ===
Constituency	deputy	party	term start	term end	notes
1st	Pascale Boyer	LREM	18 June 2017	21 June 2022	
2nd	Joël Giraud	LREM	18 June 2017	21 June 2022	

=== 16th legislature (2022-2027) ===
Constituency	deputy	party	term start	term end	notes
1st	Pascale Boyer	LREM	22 June 2022		
2nd	Joël Giraud	PR / LREM	22 June 2022		
