= Saint-André-d'Embrun =

- Commune
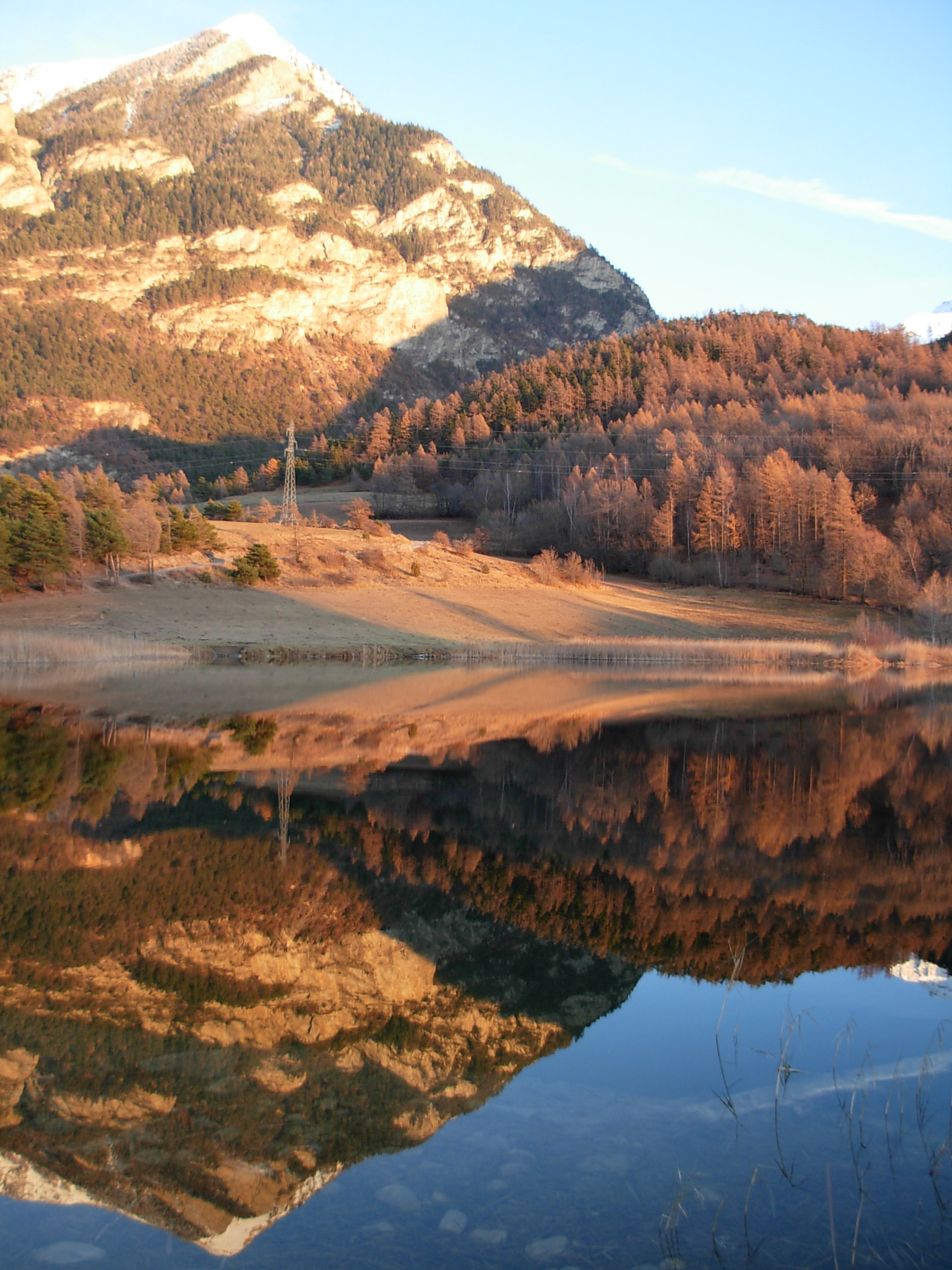
- Siguret Lake

- Coat of arms
- Location of Saint-André-d'Embrun
- Location within France Location within Provence-Alpes-Côte d'Azur
- Coordinates: 44°35′12″N 6°32′05″E
- Country: France
- Region: Provence-Alpes-Côte d'Azur
- Department: Hautes-Alpes
- Arrondissement: Gap
- Canton: Embrun

Government
  - Mayor (2026–32): Brigitte Gentilini
- Area^{1}: 38.63 km^{2} (14.92 sq mi)
- Elevation: 920 m (3,020 ft)
- Highest elevation: 2,934 m (9,626 ft)
- Lowest elevation: 796 m (2,612 ft)
- Population (2023): 705
  - Density: 18.3/km^{2} (47.3/sq mi)
- Time zone: UTC+01:00 (CET)
  - Summer (DST): UTC+02:00 (CEST)
- INSEE/Postal code: 05128 /05200
- ^{1} French Land Register data, which excludes lakes, ponds, glaciers > 1 km^{2} (0.386 sq mi or 247 acres) and river estuaries.

Saint-André-d'Embrun (French pronunciation: [sɛ̃.t‿ɑ̃dʁe dɑ̃bʁœ̃], literally Saint-André of Embrun; Occitan: Sant Andreu d'Ambrun) is a commune in the Hautes-Alpes department in southeastern France. Surrounded by the towns of Chateauroux-les-Alpes, Embrun and Crévoux, Saint-André-d'Embrun is located 36 km northeast of Gap, the largest city nearby.

== Population ==
Historical population
| Year | Pop. | ±% p.a. |
|---|---|---|
| 1968 | 415 | — |
| 1975 | 361 | −1.97% |
| 1982 | 462 | +3.59% |
| 1990 | 417 | −1.27% |
| 1999 | 495 | +1.92% |
| 2007 | 649 | +3.44% |
| 2012 | 631 | −0.56% |
| 2017 | 661 | +0.93% |
| 2023 | 705 | +1.08% |
Source: INSEE

== See also ==
- Communes of the Hautes-Alpes department
