= 2024 French legislative election in Hautes-Alpes =

Following the first round of the 2024 French legislative election on 30 June 2024, runoff elections in each constituency where no candidate received a vote share greater than 50 percent were scheduled for 7 July. Candidates permitted to stand in the runoff elections needed to either come in first or second place in the first round or achieve more than 12.5 percent of the votes of the entire electorate (as opposed to 12.5 percent of the vote share due to low turnout).

== Hautes-Alpes ==
=== 1st constituency ===
Candidate	Party or alliance		First round		Second round	
Candidate	Party or alliance		Votes	%	Votes	%
Jerôme Sainte-Marie	National Rally		15,772	38.24	18,955	48.36
Marie-José Allemand	New Popular Front	Socialist Party	12,568	30.47	20,242	51.64
Pascale Boyer	Ensemble	Renaissance	9,312	22.58		
Dorian Derringer	The Republicans		2,949	7.15		
Véronique Buisson	Far-left	Lutte Ouvrière	643	1.56		
Total			41,244	100.00	39,197	100.00
Valid votes			41,244	97.01	39,197	91.34
Invalid votes			457	1.07	936	2.18
Blank votes			815	1.92	2,778	6.47
Total votes			42,516	100.00	42,911	100.00
Registered voters/turnout			60,047	70.80	60,057	71.45

=== 2nd constituency ===
Candidate	Party or alliance		First round		Second round	
Candidate	Party or alliance		Votes	%	Votes	%
Louis Albrand	National Rally		13,115	33.88	15,902	43.68
Valérie Rossi	New Popular Front	Socialist Party	12,661	32.70	20,501	56.32
Sébastien Fine	Ensemble	Renaissance	10,338	26.70		
Johann Mondain	Independent		2,206	5.70		
Boris Guignard	Far-left	Lutte Ouvrière	394	1.02		
Total			38,714	100.00	36,403	100.00
Valid votes			38,714	97.48	36,403	91.07
Invalid votes			301	0.76	775	1.94
Blank votes			701	1.77	2,793	6.99
Total votes			39,716	100.00	39,971	100.00
Registered voters/turnout			54,517	72.85	54,530	73.30
