= Hautes-Alpes's 2nd constituency =

Constituency of the National Assembly of France

2nd constituency of the Hautes-Alpes
- inline Constituency of the National Assembly of France

- constituency in department

- Hautes-Alpes in France
- Deputy: Joël Giraud; PRV
- Department: Hautes-Alpes
- Cantons: Aiguilles, L'Argentière-la-Bessée, Briançon-Nord, Briançon-Sud, Embrun, La Grave, Guillestre, Le Monêtier-les-Bains, Orcières, Saint-Bonnet-en-Champsaur, Saint-Firmin, Savines-le-Lac

The 2nd constituency of the Hautes-Alpes is a French legislative constituency in the Hautes-Alpes department (Provence-Alpes-Côte d'Azur).

It consists of twelve cantons located in the arrondissements of Briançon and Gap: Aiguilles, L'Argentière-la-Bessée, Briançon-Nord, Briançon-Sud, Embrun, La Grave, Guillestre, Le Monêtier-les-Bains, Orcières, Saint-Bonnet-en-Champsaur, Saint-Firmin, Savines-le-Lac

== Members elected ==
| Election | Member | Party |
|---|---|---|
| 1958 | Robert Garraud | UNR |
| 1962 | Marie François-Bénard | RD |
| 1967 | Paul Dijoud | RI |
| 1968 | Paul Dijoud | RI |
| 1973 | Paul Dijoud | RI |
| 1978 | Paul Dijoud | UDF |
| 1981 | Robert de Caumont | PS |
| 1986 | Proportional representation - no election by constituency | |
| 1988 | Patrick Ollier | RPR |
| 1993 | Patrick Ollier | RPR |
| 1997 | Patrick Ollier | RPR |
| 2002 | Joël Giraud | PRG |
| 2007 | Joël Giraud | PRG |
| 2012 | Joël Giraud | PRG |
| 2017 | Joël Giraud | LREM |
| 2020 | Claire Bouchet | PRG |
| 2022 | Joël Giraud | PRV |
| 2024 | Valérie Rossi | PS |

== Election results ==
=== 2024 ===
| Candidate | Party | Alliance | First round | | Second round | |
| Candidate | Party | Alliance | Votes | % | Votes | % |
|---|---|---|---|---|---|---|
| Valérie Rossi | PS | NFP | 12,661 | 32.70 | 20,501 | 56.32 |
| Louis Albrand | RN | | 13,115 | 33.88 | 15,902 | 43.68 |
| Sébastien Fine | REN | Ensemble | 10,338 | 26.70 | | |
| Johann Mondain | DIV | | 2,206 | 5.70 | | |
| Boris Guinard | LO | | 394 | 1.02 | | |
| Valid votes | | | 38,714 | 97.48 | 36,403 | 91.07 |
| Blank votes | | | 704 | 1.77 | 2,793 | 6.99 |
| Null votes | | | 298 | 0.75 | 775 | 1.94 |
| Turnout | | | 39,716 | 72.85 | 39,971 | 73.30 |
| Abstentions | | | 14,801 | 27.15 | 14,559 | 26.70 |
| Registered voters | | | 54,517 | | 54,530 | |
| Result | | | PS GAIN | | | |

=== 2022 ===
Legislative Election 2022: Hautes-Alpes's 2nd constituency
| Party | Candidate | Votes | % | ±% |
|---|---|---|---|---|
| PRV (Ensemble) | Joël Giraud | 10,890 | 38.04 | -6.22 |
| LFI (NUPÉS) | Capucine Mounal | 8,365 | 29.22 | +9.57 |
| RN | Louis Albrand | 4,996 | 17.45 | +6.76 |
| LR (UDC) | Carole Chauvet | 1,549 | 5.41 | −7.56 |
| DVG | Rémi Roux | 1,077 | 3.76 | N/A |
| REC | Margot Pelissier | 883 | 3.08 | N/A |
| Others | N/A | 864 | 6.87 | 3.04 |
| Turnout | | 28,627 | 53.83 | −1.62 |
2nd round result
| PRV (Ensemble) | Joël Giraud | 15,056 | 56.58 | -9.58 |
| LFI (NUPÉS) | Capucine Mounal | 11,552 | 43.42 | N/A |
| Turnout | | 26,608 | 52.69 | +6.01 |
| PRV gain from LREM | | | | |

=== 2017 ===
| Candidate | Label | First round | | Second round | |
| Candidate | Label | Votes | % | Votes | % |
|---|---|---|---|---|---|
| Joël Giraud | REM | 12,566 | 44.26 | 14,823 | 68.16 |
| Arnaud Murgia | DVD | 3,683 | 12.97 | 6,923 | 31.84 |
| Christophe Tassaux | FI | 3,357 | 11.82 | | |
| Laurence Leguem | FN | 3,034 | 10.69 | | |
| Chantal Eyméoud | UDI | 3,029 | 10.67 | | |
| Agnès Antoine | ECO | 2,224 | 7.83 | | |
| Florian Demmel | DIV | 204 | 0.72 | | |
| Véronique Buisson | EXG | 148 | 0.52 | | |
| Yann Espinosa | DIV | 146 | 0.51 | | |
| Votes | | 28,391 | 100.00 | 21,746 | 100.00 |
| Valid votes | | 28,391 | 98.15 | 21,746 | 89.31 |
| Blank votes | | 383 | 1.32 | 1,875 | 7.70 |
| Null votes | | 151 | 0.52 | 727 | 2.99 |
| Turnout | | 28,925 | 55.45 | 24,348 | 46.68 |
| Abstentions | | 23,235 | 44.55 | 27,811 | 53.32 |
| Registered voters | | 52,160 | | 52,159 | |
Source: Ministry of the Interior

=== 2012 ===
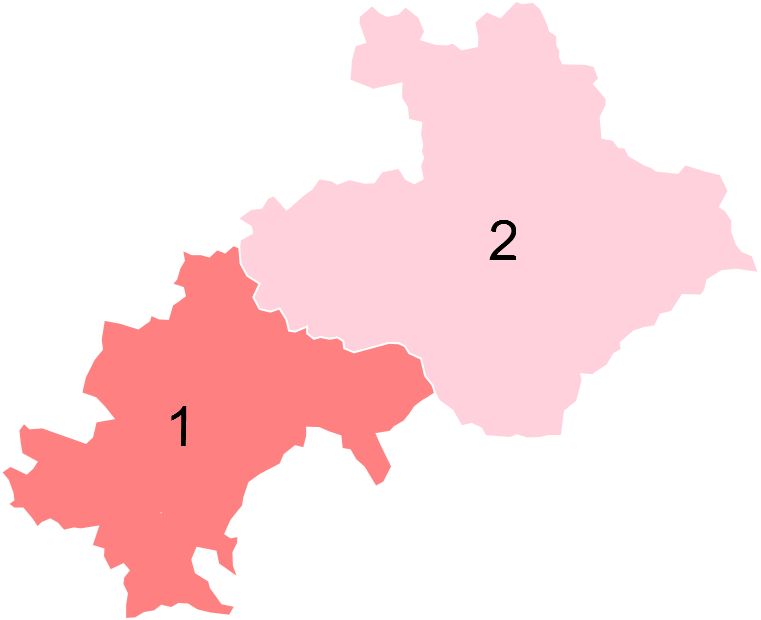
Results in the Hautes-Alpes' two constituencies in 2012 : pink (PS), pale pink (PRG)

Summary of the 10 June and 17 June 2012 French legislative in Hautes-Alpes' 2nd Constituency election results
| Candidate | Party | | 1st round | | 2nd round | |
| Candidate | Party | | Votes | % | Votes | % |
|---|---|---|---|---|---|---|
| Joël Giraud | Radical Party of the Left | PRG | 13,362 | 43.00% | 17,461 | 57.46% |
| Chantal Eymeoud | Union for a Popular Movement | UMP | 10,438 | 33.59% | 12,926 | 42.54% |
| Sophie Briand | National Front | FN | 3,126 | 10.06% | | |
| Catherine Guigli | Left Front | FG | 1,674 | 5.39% | | |
| Francine Daerden | The Greens | VEC | 1,665 | 5.36% | | |
| Sandrine Faidy | Miscellaneous Right | DVD | 276 | 0.89% | | |
| Monique Perrin Czekalski | Ecologist | ECO | 254 | 0.82% | | |
| Michel Ben-Haim | Other | AUT | 156 | 0.50% | | |
| Véronique Buisson | Far Left | EXG | 126 | 0.41% | | |
| Total | | | 31,077 | 100% | 30,387 | 100% |
| Registered voters | | | 50,805 | | 50,810 | |
| Blank/Void ballots | | | 625 | 1.97% | 1,022 | 3.25% |
| Turnout | | | 31,702 | 62.40% | 31,409 | 61.82% |
| Abstentions | | | 19,103 | 37.60% | 19,401 | 38.18% |
| Result | | | | | PRG HOLD | |

=== 2007 ===
Summary of the 10 June and 17 June 2007 French legislative in Hautes-Alpes' 2nd Constituency election results
| Candidate | Party | | 1st round | | 2nd round | |
| Candidate | Party | | Votes | % | Votes | % |
|---|---|---|---|---|---|---|
| Joël Giraud | Radical Party of the Left | PRG | 11,248 | 36.84% | 17,184 | 54.82% |
| Alain Bayrou | Union for a Popular Movement | UMP | 10,666 | 34.94% | 14,163 | 45.18% |
| Chantal Eymeoud | Democratic Movement | MoDem | 4,327 | 14.17% | | |
| Pierre Leroy | The Greens | VEC | 1,238 | 4.06% | | |
| Michel Louis Pellion | National Front | FN | 667 | 2.18% | | |
| Christian Schuller | Communist | COM | 618 | 2.02% | | |
| Vincent Chaboy | Far Left | EXG | 517 | 1.69% | | |
| André Garcia | Hunting, Fishing, Nature, Traditions | CPNT | 450 | 1.47% | | |
| Monique Perrin | Divers | DIV | 234 | 0.77% | | |
| Claude Bobin | Movement for France | MPF | 197 | 0.65% | | |
| Jacques Gollion | Ecologist | ECO | 151 | 0.49% | | |
| Gérard Sauge | Far Left | EXG | 134 | 0.44% | | |
| Jean-Pierre Bouteille | Far Right | EXD | 83 | 0.27% | | |
| Total | | | 30,530 | 100% | 31,347 | 100% |
| Registered voters | | | 45,853 | | 45,842 | |
| Blank/Void ballots | | | 495 | 1.60% | 855 | 2.66% |
| Turnout | | | 31,025 | 67.66% | 32,202 | 70.25% |
| Abstentions | | | 14,828 | 32.34% | 13,640 | 29.75% |
| Result | | | | | PRG HOLD | |

=== 2002 ===
Legislative Election 2002: Hautes-Alpes's 2nd constituency
| Party | Candidate | Votes | % | ±% |
|---|---|---|---|---|
| UMP | Jean-Yves Dusserre | 11,286 | 40.55 | |
| PRG | Joël Giraud | 9,676 | 34.77 | |
| FN | Nicole Samat | 1,991 | 7.15 | |
| LV | Francois Labande | 1,494 | 5.37 | |
| PCF | Antoine Guardabascio | 913 | 3.28 | |
| CPNT | Marie-Christine Pierre | 680 | 2.44 | |
| Others | N/A | 1,792 | | |
| Turnout | | 28,463 | 66.95 | |
2nd round result
| PRG | Joël Giraud | 13,947 | 50.90 | |
| UMP | Jean-Yves Dusserre | 13,454 | 49.10 | |
| Turnout | | 28,237 | 66.42 | |
| PRG gain from UMP | | | | |

=== 1997 ===
Legislative Election 1997: Hautes-Alpes's 2nd constituency
| Party | Candidate | Votes | % | ±% |
|---|---|---|---|---|
| RPR | Patrick Ollier | 8,213 | 33.41 | |
| PS | Alain Musson | 5,208 | 21.19 | |
| DIV | Joël Giraud | 3,947 | 16.06 | |
| FN | Vanessa Bickers-Garcia | 2,894 | 11.77 | |
| PCF | Antoine Guardabascio | 1,886 | 7.67 | |
| LV | Hervé Gasdon | 1,206 | 4.91 | |
| MPF | Jean-Luc Pierre | 641 | 2.61 | |
| Others | N/A | 588 | | |
| Turnout | | 26,026 | 67.23 | |
2nd round result
| RPR | Patrick Ollier | 13,438 | 51.03 | |
| PS | Alain Musson | 12,896 | 48.97 | |
| Turnout | | 28,168 | 72.78 | |
| RPR hold | | | | |

== Sources ==
- Notes and portraits of the French MPs under the Fifth Republic, National Assembly of France
- 2012 French legislative elections:Hautes-Alpes' 2nd constituency (first round and run-off), Minister of the Interior (France)
