= Departmental Council of Hautes-Alpes =

Departmental legislature in France

- Logo of the Council

Leadership
- President: Jean-Marie Bernard, LR since 2 April 2015

Meeting place
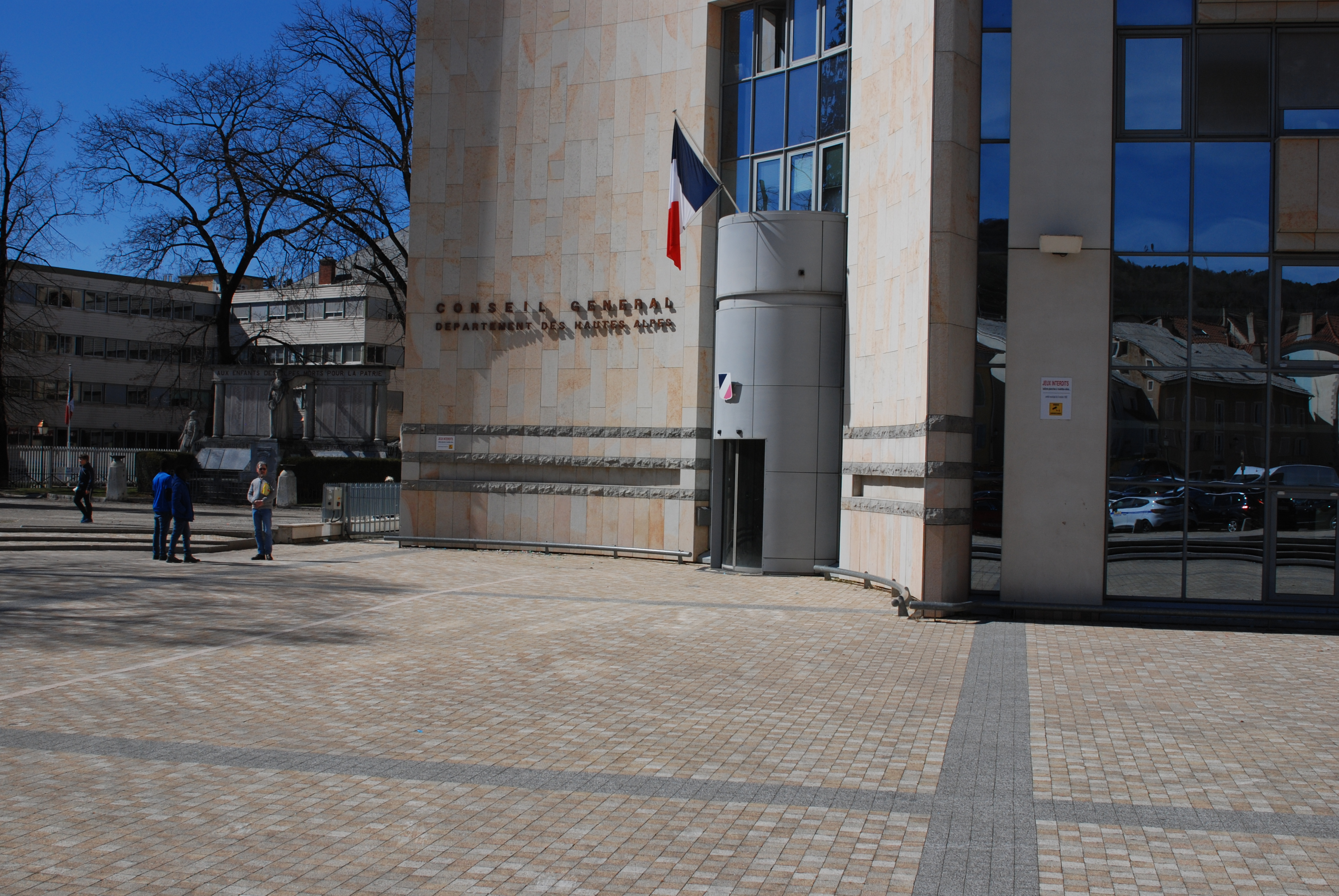
- Hôtel du Département, Place Saint Arnoux, Gap

Website
- www.hautes-alpes.fr

The Departmental Council of Hautes-Alpes (French: Conseil départemental des Hautes-Alpes) is the deliberative assembly of the Hautes-Alpes department in the region of Provence-Alpes-Côte d'Azur. It consists of 30 members (departmental councilors) from its 15 cantons and its headquarters are in Gap, capital of the department.

The president of the departmental council is Jean-Marie Bernard.

== Vice-Presidents ==
The president of the departmental council is assisted by 9 vice-presidents chosen from among the departmental advisors. Each of them has a delegation of authority.

List of vice-presidents of the Hautes-Alpes Departmental Council (as of 2021)
Order	Name	Party	Canton (constituency)	Delegation
1st	Patrick Ricou	LR	Saint-Bonnet-en-Champsaur	Finance, territorial attractiveness, the development agency and deputy chairman of the Tenders Commission.
2nd	Maryvonne Grenier	LR	Gap-2	Youth, colleges and education
3rd	Marine Michel	LR	Briançon-1	Sports
4th	Marcel Cannat	DVD	Guillestre	Roads, departmental buildings, aerodromes, military affairs and security
5th	Arnaud Murgia	LR	Briançon-1	Regional planning
6th	Ginette Mostachi	DVD	Gap-3	Social cohesion
7th	Marc Viossat	UDI	Embrun	Energy transition
8th	Bernadette Saudemont	DVD	Veynes	Culture, regional and European affairs
9th	Gérard Tenoux	DVD	Serres	Technology and housing

== Composition ==
The Hautes-Alpes departmental council includes 30 departmental councilors elected from the 15 cantons of Hautes-Alpes.

Political composition (as of 2021)
Party	Acronym	Seats	Groups
Majority (24 seats)
Miscellaneous right	DVD	17	Departmental majority
The Republicans	LR	5	Departmental majority
Union of Democrats and Independents	UDI	2	Departmental majority
Opposition (6 seats)
Miscellaneous left	DVG	4	Propositions pour les Hautes-Alpes
Sans étiquette	SE	2	Propositions pour les Hautes-Alpes
