= Château de Picomtal =

14th-century building in Hautes-Alpes, France

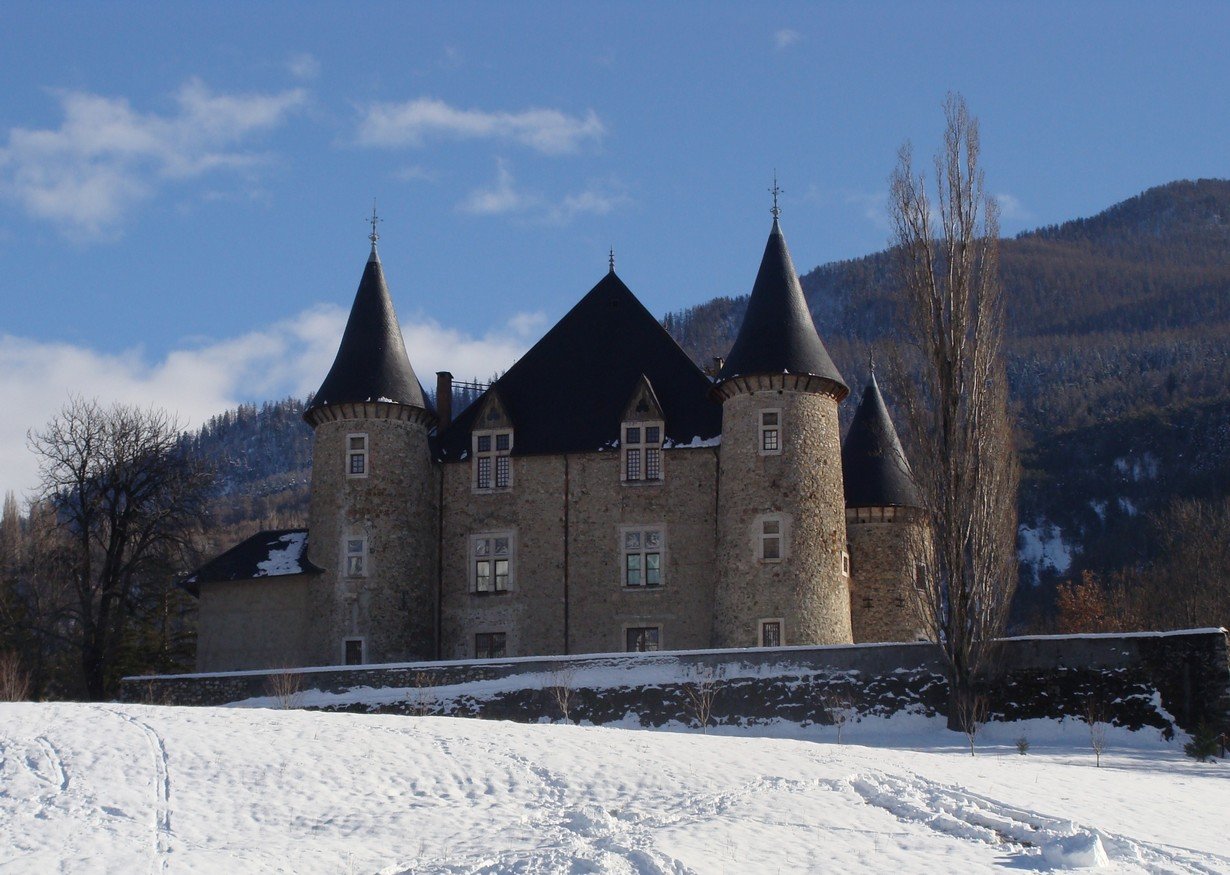
- Interactive map of the Château de Picomtal area
- Etymology: Derives from "Las crottos," meaning "cellars" in Provençal.

General information
- Status: Topped-out
- Type: Château
- Architectural style: Medieval, Neo-Gothic (19th century renovation)
- Location: Crots, Hautes-Alpes France, 295 avenue du Château 05200 Crots
- Coordinates: 44°31′55″N 6°28′21″E
- Construction started: c.1080 AD
- Renovated: 1270, 1375–1380, 1507–1510, 1724, 1831, c. 1880, 1999–2003
- Owner: Jacques Peureux and Sharon Halperin

Technical details
- Material: Stone, wood
- Floor count: 3

Design and construction
- Known for: Gardens, Floorboards

Website
- picomtal.fr

The Château de Picomtal is located at 295 Avenue du Château in the village of Crots, in the Hautes-Alpes department of France.

It falls within territory that is part of the Écrins National Park. It overlooks the Durance valley. The Château is in close proximity to the Lac de Serre-Ponçon and the town of Embrun.

== History ==
The structure was originally built as a wooden keep by the Embrun family in the 11th century. The family had acted as vigueries and vidames in the city of Embrun, assisting the local archbishop. The family was driven out of the city during a revolution around 1080 AD. They fled to the lower part of Saint Jean Parish, where they built the keep, thus founding Crottes.

In the 13th century the original wooden keep was replaced with one made of stone, which now is the southwest tower of the castle, also known as the Boniface Tower.

In the 14th century, the Embrun family added on to the stone keep, building it up into a château with four towers. Martin de la Vilette, who had inherited the château from the Embrun family, began an extensive remodeling of the building in 1507.

De la Vilette had two of the towers completely demolished, doubled the floor area, had two new towers built at the two new corners of the building, and made other structural improvements. At some point before 1692, more improvements were made, including French-style ceilings, modifying the floorplan, and the building of a wooden balcony which has since been removed. In 1692, Victor Amadeus II, Duke of Savoy, torched the eastern part of the castle.

In 1769 the heirs to the château ceded the property to Joseph Cellon, a retired infantry officer and bourgeoisie from Embrun. The building passed between many hands up until 1876, when it was purchased at an auction by a retired lawyer named Joseph Roman. Roman carried out extensive renovations of the building. One of the projects included having new wood floors put in, a task carried out by local carpenter Joachim Martin.

Unbeknownst to Roman, Martin wrote 72 diary entries on the bottoms of the floorboard before he nailed them down. The entries mainly detailed local gossip and scandals, including infanticide, a promiscuous local priest, stories of corruption, and more. The diary was uncovered during renovations in 2000, and made famous in the book Joaquim's Floorboard by Jacques-Olivier Boudon.

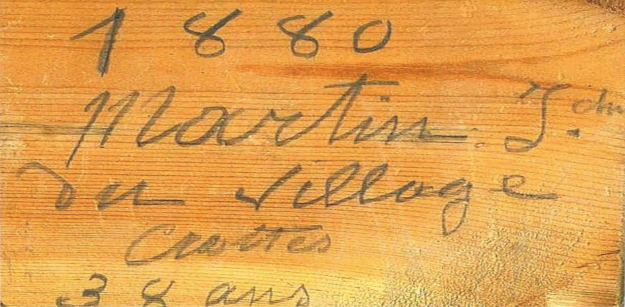
One of the floorboards featuring Joachim's Diary

== Hotel ==
In 1998, the château was purchased by Jacques Peureux and Sharon Halperin. They gave the building a major renovation, during which Martin's diary was discovered. The renovations were completed in 2003. Peureux and Haperin converted the residence into a bed-and-breakfast with 9 themed rooms. Each room has a different theme and name.
