= Marie-José Allemand =

French politician (born 1970)

Member of the National Assembly for Hautes-Alpes's 1st constituency
- Incumbent
- Assumed office 8 July 2024
- Preceded by: Pascale Boyer

Personal details
- Born: 27 January 1970 (age 56) Manosque, France
- Party: Socialist Party
- Occupation: Farmer, politician

Marie-José Allemand (French pronunciation: [maʁiʒoze almɑ̃]; born 27 January 1970) is a French politician and farmer who has represented the 1st constituency of Hautes-Alpes in the National Assembly since 2024. She is a member of the Socialist Party (PS).

== Career ==
Together with her husband Allemand owns a farm in Gap. She first became involved in politics in 1991 when she protested the closure of a local school, before joining the Socialist Party in the 2000s. In 2011 she ran for a seat in the General Council of Hautes-Alpes in the canton of Gap-Centre and placed third in the first round with 17% of the vote. She worked as a parliamentary staffer for local Socialist deputy Karine Berger (2012–2017).

In 2018 she became first secretary of the Socialist Party in Hautes-Alpes. In the 2020 municipal election, she led the Socialists in Gap, with her list earning 13% of the first-round vote.

Allemand ran in the 2024 legislative election under the New Popular Front (NFP) alliance and with 30.4% of the vote she placed second in the first round behind the National Rally (RN) candidate. Outgoing deputy Pascale Boyer of Renaissance (RE), who placed third, withdrew ahead of the second round, allowing Allemand to win with 51.6% of the vote.

In the National Assembly, she sits on the Committee on Laws. Alongside her committee assignments, she presides over the French-Moldovan Parliamentary Friendship Group and is a French member of the Assemblée parlementaire de la Francophonie.
