= Joachim Martin =

French joiner and memorialist

- Born: April 18, 1842; Les Crottes, Hautes-Alpes, Kingdom of France
- Died: 1897 (aged 54–55); Les Crottes, Hautes-Alpes, French Republic
- Occupation: Carpenter
- Known for: Hiding a diary under the floorboards of Château de Picomtal

Joachim Martin (April 18, 1842 – 1897) was a carpenter from the village of Les Crottes, in the French Alps, who left a secret diary underneath the floorboards of the Château de Picomtal.

== Diary ==
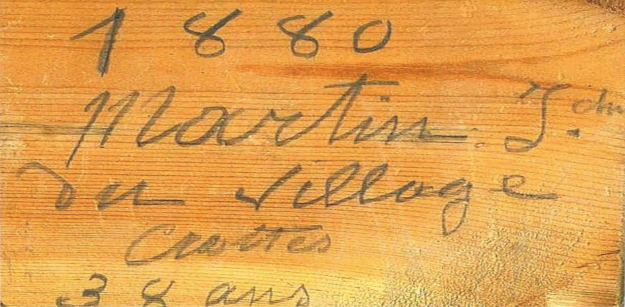
Signature of Joachim Martin (1880)

The diary is made up of 72 entries dated between 1880 and 1881. Varying between mundane observations and poignant personal opinions, the diary provides a frank look into the provincial lives of Martin and his neighbors. Among his revelations are the fact that another villager had committed infanticide multiple times and hidden the evidence under a stable. Martin refused to report the man, even when he tried to seduce Martin's wife, writing, "He's my old childhood friend. And his mother is my father's mistress."

The floorboards were excavated in the early 2000s, but the existence of the diary was not widely known until the publication of a book called Joaquim's Floorboard by historian Jacques-Olivier Boudon. He noted that the diary consists of "the words of an ordinary working man, a man of the people [...] saying things that are very personal, because he knows they will not ever be read except a long time in the future."
