= Claire Bouchet =

French politician (born 1954)

Member of the National Assembly for Hautes-Alpes's 2nd constituency
- In office 27 August 2020 – 20 June 2022
- Preceded by: Joël Giraud
- Succeeded by: Joël Giraud

Personal details
- Born: 9 January 1954 (age 72) Gap, France
- Party: Renaissance; Radical Movement

Claire Bouchet (French pronunciation: [klɛʁ buʃɛ]; born 9 January 1954) is a French politician of the Radical Movement who served as Member of Parliament for Hautes-Alpes's 2nd constituency from 2020 to 2022.

== Early life ==
Bouchet was born in Gap, Hautes-Alpes.

== Political career ==
She was mayor of La Motte-en-Champsaur from 2001 to 2014.

In the 2017 French legislative election, she was a substitute candidate. She replaced Joël Giraud in the National Assembly when he was appointed to government.

She did not seek re-election in the 2022 French legislative election.
