= Canton of La Grave =

Coordinates: 45°02′49″N 6°18′24″E

La Grave
- Former canton
- Interactive map of La Grave
- Country: France
- Region: Provence-Alpes-Côte d'Azur
- Department: Hautes-Alpes
- No. of communes: {{{nbcomm}}}
- Disbanded: 2015
- Area: 204.42 km^{2} (78.93 sq mi)
- Population (2012): 797
  - Density: 3.90/km^{2} (10.1/sq mi)

The canton of La Grave is a former administrative division in southeastern France. It was disbanded following the French canton reorganisation which came into effect in March 2015. It consisted of 2 communes, which joined the new canton of Briançon-1 in 2015. It had 797 inhabitants (2012).

The canton comprised the following communes:

- La Grave
- Villar-d'Arêne

== Demographics ==
Historical population Canton of La Grave
Year	1962	1968	1975	1982	1990	1999
Pop.	697	722	668	637	633	730
±%	—	+3.6%	−7.5%	−4.6%	−0.6%	+15.3%
From the year 1962 on: No double counting – residents of multiple communes (e.g. students and military personnel) are counted only once. Source: INSEE

== See also ==
- Cantons of the Hautes-Alpes department
