= Pascale Boyer =

French politician (born 1965)

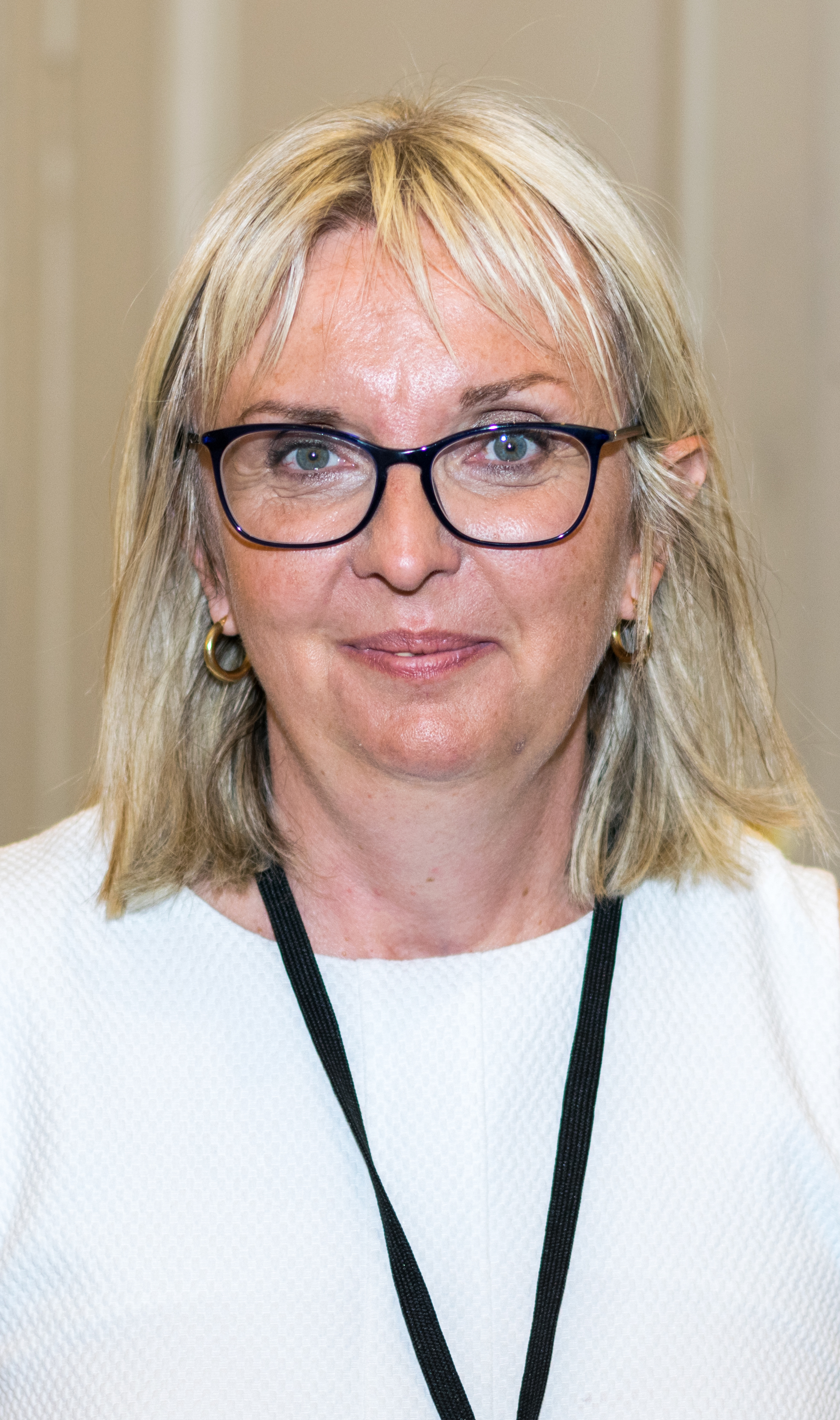

Member of the National Assembly for Hautes-Alpes's 1st constituency
- In office 21 June 2017 – 9 June 2024
- Preceded by: Karine Berger
- Succeeded by: Marie-José Allemand

Personal details
- Born: 28 September 1965 (age 60) Saint-Mandé, France
- Party: Renaissance (2017–present)
- Other political affiliations: Socialist (until 2016)

Pascale Boyer (French pronunciation: [paskal bwaje]; born 28 September 1965) is a French politician of Renaissance (RE) who represented the 1st constituency of Hautes-Alpes in the National Assembly from 2017 to 2024. A former member of the Socialist Party (PS), which she left in 2016, she also held a seat in the Departmental Council of Hautes-Alpes from 2016 to 2021 for the canton of Gap-1.

In the 2017 legislative election, Boyer won 57.9% of the second-round vote against the candidate of The Republicans. In 2022, after placing second in the first round, she was narrowly re-elected in the second round with 50.3% of the vote, defeating the candidate of the La France Insoumise. In 2024, she lost her seat while seeking a third term, placing third in the first round with 22.5%.

== See also ==
- List of MPs who lost their seat in the 2024 French legislative election
