= Baratier =

- Commune
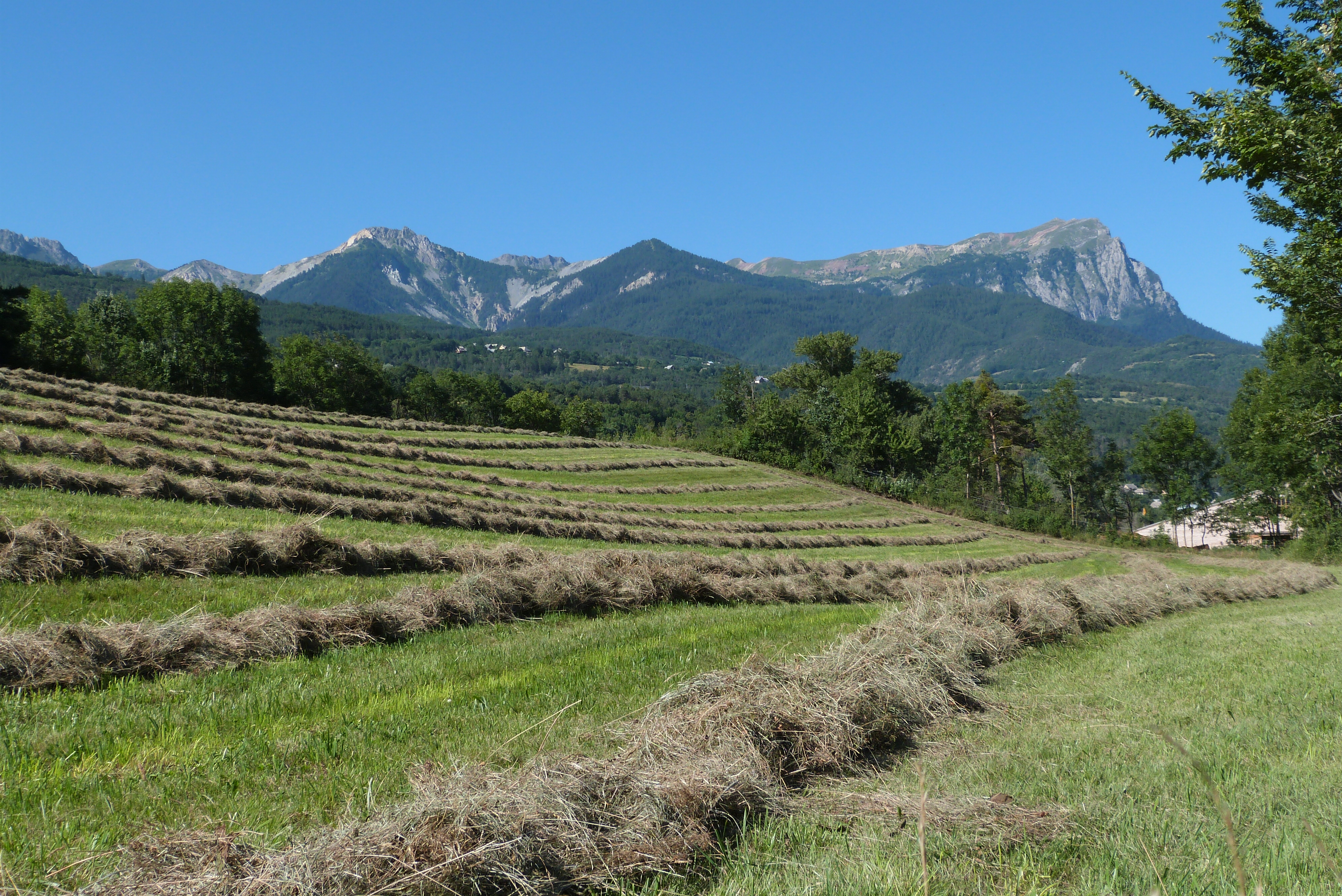

- Coat of arms
- Location of Baratier
- Location within France Location within Provence-Alpes-Côte d'Azur
- Coordinates: 44°32′19″N 6°29′45″E
- Country: France
- Region: Provence-Alpes-Côte d'Azur
- Department: Hautes-Alpes
- Arrondissement: Gap
- Canton: Embrun
- Intercommunality: Serre-Ponçon

Government
  - Mayor (2026–32): Christine Maximin
- Area^{1}: 15.99 km^{2} (6.17 sq mi)
- Elevation: 861 m (2,825 ft)
- Highest elevation: 2,858 m (9,377 ft)
- Lowest elevation: 780 m (2,560 ft)
- Population (2023): 648
  - Density: 40.5/km^{2} (105/sq mi)
- Time zone: UTC+01:00 (CET)
  - Summer (DST): UTC+02:00 (CEST)
- INSEE/Postal code: 05012 /5200
- ^{1} French Land Register data, which excludes lakes, ponds, glaciers > 1 km^{2} (0.386 sq mi or 247 acres) and river estuaries.

Baratier (French pronunciation: [baʁatje]) is a commune in the Hautes-Alpes department in southeastern France.

== Population ==
Historical population
Year	Pop.	±% p.a.
1965	222	—
1975	209	−0.60%
1982	243	+2.18%
1990	356	+4.89%
1999	463	+2.96%
2007	512	+1.27%
2012	499	−0.51%
2017	603	+3.86%
2023	648	+1.21%
Source: INSEE

== See also ==
- Communes of the Hautes-Alpes department
