= Canton of Briançon-Sud =

Coordinates: 44°53′47″N 6°38′08″E

Briançon-Sud
- Former canton
- Interactive map of Briançon-Sud
- Country: France
- Region: Provence-Alpes-Côte d'Azur
- Department: Hautes-Alpes
- No. of communes: {{{nbcomm}}}
- Disbanded: 2015
- Population (2012): 10,572

The canton was created in 1973. The canton of Briançon-Sud is a former administrative division in southeastern France. It was disbanded following the French canton reorganisation which came into effect in March 2015. It had 10,572 inhabitants (2012).

The canton comprised the following communes:

- Briançon (partly)
- Cervières
- Puy-Saint-André
- Puy-Saint-Pierre
- Villar-Saint-Pancrace

== Demographics ==
Historical population
Year	Pop.	±%
1990	9,391	—
1999	9,671	+3.0%
2012	10,572	+9.3%

== See also ==
- Cantons of the Hautes-Alpes department
