= Arnaud Murgia =

French politician (born 1984)

Mayor of Briançon
- Incumbent
- Assumed office 4 July 2020
- Preceded by: Gérard Fromm

Personal details
- Born: 16 November 1984 (age 41)
- Party: Independent (since 2022)
- Other political affiliations: The Republicans (until 2022)

Arnaud Murgia (born 16 November 1984) is a French politician serving as mayor of Briançon since 2020. He concurrently serves as president of Écrins National Park since 2021. He is a member of the Departmental Council of Hautes-Alpes, and has served as its 5th vice president since 2021. In the 2017 legislative election, he was a candidate for Hautes-Alpes's 2nd constituency.
