= Joël Giraud =

French politician (born 1959)

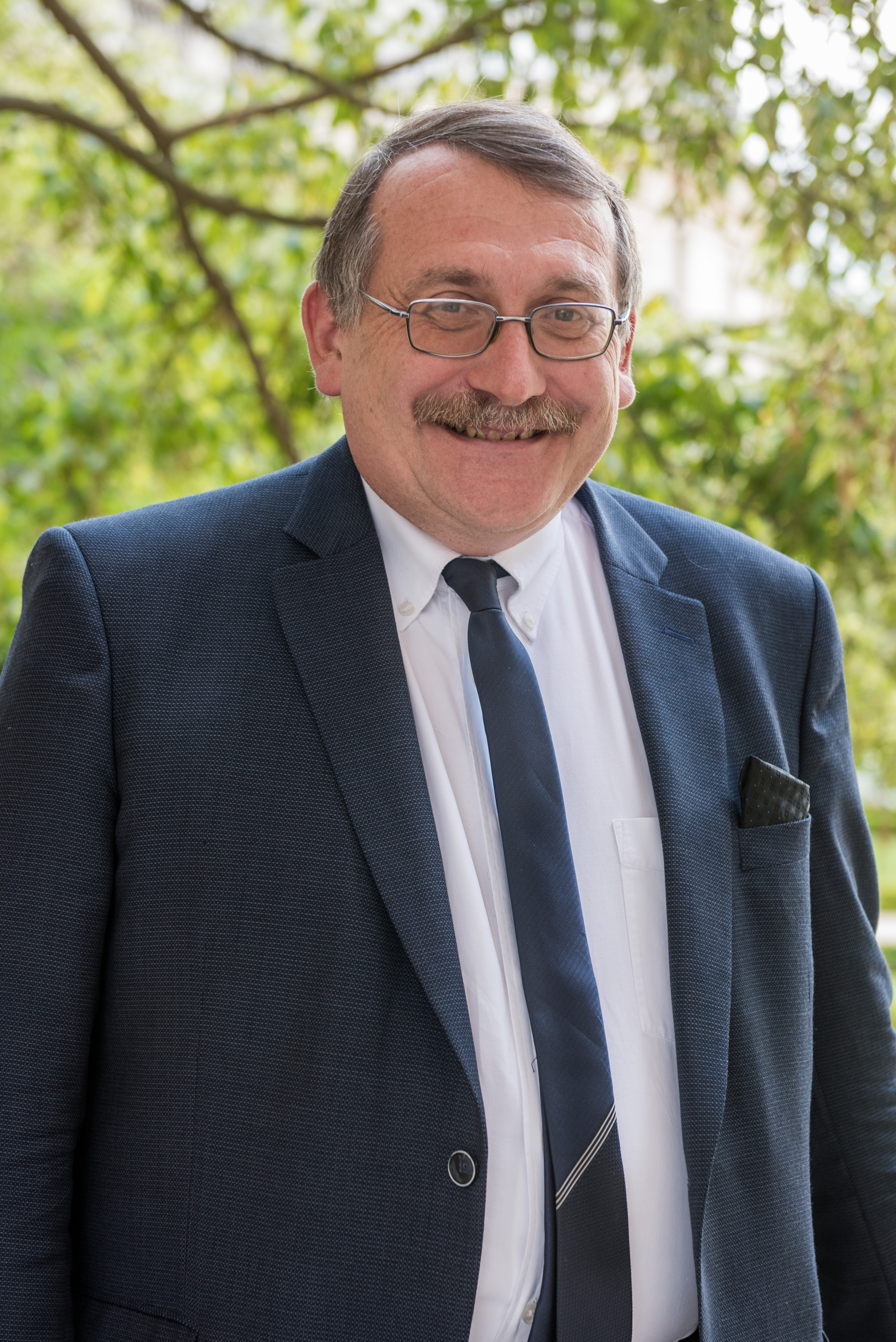
- Giraud in 2017

Minister of Territorial Cohesion and Relations with Local Authorities
- In office 5 March 2022 – 20 May 2022
- Prime Minister: Jean Castex
- Preceded by: Jacqueline Gourault
- Succeeded by: Amélie de Montchalin

Secretary of State for Rurality
- In office 26 July 2020 – 5 March 2022
- Prime Minister: Jean Castex
- Preceded by: Jean-Michel Baylet (Note: As Minister of Spatial Planning, Rurality and Territorial Collectivities in 2017.)
- Succeeded by: Dominique Faure

Member of the National Assembly for Hautes-Alpes's 2nd constituency
- In office 22 June 2022 – 9 June 2024
- Preceded by: Claire Bouchet
- Succeeded by: Valérie Rossi
- In office 18 June 2002 – 26 August 2020
- Preceded by: Patrick Ollier
- Succeeded by: Claire Bouchet

Mayor of L'Argentière-la-Bessée
- In office 20 March 1989 – 29 July 2017
- Preceded by: Auguste Toye
- Succeeded by: Patrick Vigne

Personal details
- Born: Joël Pierre Gilles Giraud; 14 October 1959 (age 66) Gap, France
- Party: Renaissance (2016–present)
- Other political affiliations: Radical Party of the Left (1998–2017)
- Education: École nationale supérieure des postes, télégraphes et téléphones École nationale d'administration
- Profession: Civil servant

Joël Pierre Gilles Giraud (French pronunciation: [ʒɔɛl ʒiʁo]; born 14 October 1959) is a French retired politician who briefly served as Minister of Territorial Cohesion and Relations with Local Authorities under Prime Minister Jean Castex in 2022. A member of both Renaissance (RE) and the Radical Movement (MR), he previously represented the 2nd constituency of the Hautes-Alpes department in the National Assembly from 2002 to 2020 and served as Secretary of State for Rurality from 2020 until 2022.

== Political career ==
=== Career in local politics ===
An alumnus of the École nationale d'administration, Giraud first entered the municipal council of L'Argentière-la-Bessée in 1986. He held the mayorship of L'Argentière-la-Bessée from 1989 to 2017, as well as one of the vice presidencies of the Regional Council of Provence-Alpes-Côte d'Azur under President Michel Vauzelle from 2004 to 2014.

=== Career in national politics ===
Elected to Parliament in Hautes-Alpes's 2nd constituency in 2002, he was reelected in 2007, 2012 and 2017. He is a former Secretary of the Economic Affairs Committee. He was a member of the Radical Party of the Left until 2017, when it was merged with the Radical Party into Radical Movement, which Giraud joined. He has also been a member of Renaissance since 2016.

In addition to his committee assignments, Giraud has been a member of the French delegation to the Franco-German Parliamentary Assembly from 2019 to 2020 and again since 2022. He also chaired the French-Italian Parliamentary Friendship Group from 2012 to 2017.

Giraud was appointed to the Castex government in 2020 as Secretary of State for Rurality under Minister Jacqueline Gourault. Upon her appointment to the Constitutional Council in 2022, he succeeded her as Minister of Territorial Cohesion and Relations with Local Authorities.

Following the 2022 legislative election, Giraud stood as a candidate for the National Assembly's presidency; in an internal vote, he lost against Yaël Braun-Pivet.

On 9 June 2024, Giraud announced the end of his political career after the announcement of the dissolution of the National Assembly. Giraud denounced a potential government of cohabitation "between the president and the far-right".

== Personal life ==
Giraud is openly gay.

== Honours ==
- Knight of the Legion of Honour (2025)

== See also ==
- List of deputies from Hautes-Alpes
