= Saint-Sauveur, Hautes-Alpes =

Saint-Sauveur
- Commune
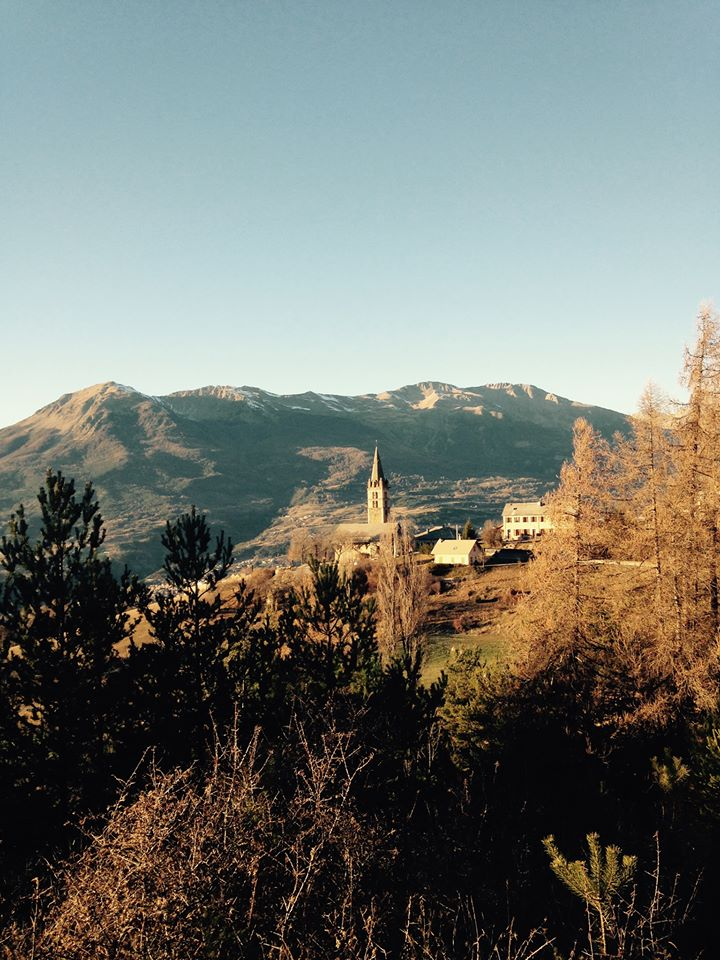

- Coat of arms
- Location of Saint-Sauveur
- Location within France Location within Provence-Alpes-Côte d'Azur
- Coordinates: 44°32′30″N 6°31′16″E
- Country: France
- Region: Provence-Alpes-Côte d'Azur
- Department: Hautes-Alpes
- Arrondissement: Gap
- Canton: Embrun

Government
  - Mayor (2026–32): Julien Pichon
- Area^{1}: 24.18 km^{2} (9.34 sq mi)
- Elevation: 1,212 m (3,976 ft)
- Highest elevation: 2,420 m (7,940 ft)
- Lowest elevation: 791 m (2,595 ft)
- Population (2023): 481
  - Density: 19.9/km^{2} (51.5/sq mi)
- Time zone: UTC+01:00 (CET)
  - Summer (DST): UTC+02:00 (CEST)
- INSEE/Postal code: 05156 /05200
- ^{1} French Land Register data, which excludes lakes, ponds, glaciers > 1 km^{2} (0.386 sq mi or 247 acres) and river estuaries.

Saint-Sauveur (French pronunciation: [sɛ̃ sovœʁ]; Vivaro-Alpine: Sant Sauvaire) is a commune in the Hautes-Alpes department in southeastern France.

== Population ==
Historical population
Year	Pop.	±% p.a.
1968	202	—
1975	202	+0.00%
1982	270	+4.23%
1990	298	+1.24%
1999	392	+3.09%
2007	436	+1.34%
2012	430	−0.28%
2017	499	+3.02%
2023	481	−0.61%
Source: INSEE

== See also ==
- Communes of the Hautes-Alpes department
