= Hautes-Alpes's 1st constituency =

Constituency of the National Assembly of France

1st constituency of Hautes-Alpes
- inline Constituency of the National Assembly of France

- constituency in department

- Hautes-Alpes in France
- Deputy: Pascale Boyer; RE
- Department: Hautes-Alpes
- Cantons: Aspres-sur-Buëch, Barcillonnette, La Bâtie-Neuve, Gap-Campagne, Gap-Centre, Gap-Nord-Est, Gap-Nord-Ouest, Gap-Sud-Est, Gap-Sud-Ouest, Laragne-Monteglin, Orpierre, Ribiers, Rosans, Saint-Étienne-en-Dévoluy, Serres, Tallard, Veynes
- Registered voters: 73,462

The 1st constituency of the Hautes-Alpes is a French legislative constituency in the Hautes-Alpes département.

== Members elected ==
Election	Member	Party
1958	Robert Lecourt	MRP
1959	Armand Barniaudy	MRP
1962	Armand Barniaudy	MRP
1966	Armand Barniaudy	DC
1967	Émile Didier	PRV
1968	Émile Didier	PRV
1971	Pierre Bernard-Reymond	CDP
1973	Pierre Bernard-Reymond	CDP
1976	Pierre Bernard-Reymond	CDS
1977	René Serres	CDS
1978	René Serres	UFD
1978	Pierre Bernard-Reymond	UFD
1978	René Serres	UFD
1981	Daniel Chevallier	PS
1986	Proportional representation - no election by constituency	
1988	Daniel Chevallier	PS
1993	Henriette Martinez	RPR
1997	Daniel Chevallier	PS
2002	Henriette Martinez	UMP
2007	Henriette Martinez	UMP
2012	Karine Berger	PS
2017	Pascale Boyer	LREM
2022	Pascale Boyer	RE
2024	Marie-José Allemand	PS

== Election results ==
=== 2024 ===
Candidate	Party	Alliance	First round		Second round	
Candidate	Party	Alliance	Votes	%	Votes	%
Marie-José Allemand	PS	NFP	12,568	30.47	20,242	51.64
Jérôme Sainte-Marie	RN		15,774	38.24	18,955	48.36
Pascale Boyer	REN	Ensemble	9,312	22.58		
Dorian Deininger	LR	UDC	2,950	7.15		
Véronique Buisson	LO		643	1.56		
Valid votes			41,257	97.01	39,197	91.34
Blank votes			833	1.96	2,778	6.47
Null votes			440	1.03	936	2.18
Turnout			42,520	70.81	42,911	71.45
Abstentions			17,527	29.19	17,146	28.55
Registered voters			60,047		60,057	
Result			PS GAIN			

=== 2022 ===
Legislative Election 2022: Hautes-Alpes's 1st constituency
Party	Candidate	Votes	%	±%
LFI (NUPÉS)	Michel Philippo	8,562	28.27	+1.53
LREM (Ensemble)	Pascale Boyer	7,543	24.90	-7.03
RN	Eric Sarlin	6,552	21.63	+8.05
LR (UDC)	Kevin Para	3,803	12.56	−1.53
REC	Patricia Hours	1,116	3.68	N/A
DVE	Christine Gamerre	629	2.08	+0.61
Others	N/A	2,084	6.87	
Turnout		30,289	52.24	+0.70
2nd round result
LREM (Ensemble)	Pascale Boyer	13,767	50.36	-7.56
LFI (NUPÉS)	Michel Philippo	13,569	49.64	N/A
Turnout		27,336	51.18	−7.65
LREM hold				

=== 2017 ===
Candidate	Label	First round		Second round	
Candidate	Label	Votes	%	Votes	%
Pascale Boyer	REM	9,258	31.93	12,151	57.92
Catherine Asso	LR	4,084	14.09	8,828	42.08
Patrick Deroin	FN	3,938	13.58		
Éléonore Flandin	FI	3,548	12.24		
Karine Berger	PS	3,320	11.45		
Jean-Marc Passeron	DIV	2,317	7.99		
Pierre Villard	PCF	884	3.05		
Jean-Pierre Coyret	DVD	547	1.89		
Chantal Sarrut	ECO	427	1.47		
Marcelle Buchlin-Schwendemann	ECO	314	1.08		
Brigitte Bourg	DIV	197	0.68		
Boris Guignard	EXG	160	0.55		
Votes		28,994	100.00	20,979	100.00
Valid votes		28,994	97.40	20,979	83.47
Blank votes		575	1.93	2,966	11.80
Null votes		200	0.67	1,189	4.73
Turnout		29,769	51.54	25,134	43.53
Abstentions		27,988	48.46	32,609	56.47
Registered voters		57,757		57,743	
Source: Ministry of the Interior

=== 2012 ===
Summary of the 10 June and 17 June 2012 French legislative in Hautes-Alpes' 1st Constituency election results
Candidate	Party		1st round		2nd round	
Candidate	Party		Votes	%	Votes	%
Karine Berger	Socialist Party	PS	10,181	29.92%	17,804	54.71%
Jean Cointe	Union for a Popular Movement	UMP	9,206	27.05%	14,738	45.29%
Elodie Monier	National Front	FN	4,999	14.69%		
Guy Blanc	Miscellaneous Left	DVG	3,650	10.73%		
Jean-Claude Eyraud	Left Front	FG	3,404	10.00%		
Bernard Derbez	The Greens	VEC	1,315	3.86%		
Thierry Pajot		CEN	630	1.85%		
Danielle Fay	Miscellaneous Right	DVD	264	0.78%		
Guy Hadji	Ecologist	ECO	154	0.45%		
Jacques Daudon	Other	AUT	121	0.36%		
Fabrice Rosay	Far Left	EXG	107	0.31%		
Total			VALID VOTES	100%	VALID VOTES	100%
Registered voters						
Blank/Void ballots				%		%
Turnout				%		%
Abstentions				%		%
Result					PS GAIN	

=== 2007 ===
Summary of the 10 June and 17 June 2007 French legislative in Hautes-Alpes' 1st Constituency election results
Candidate	Party		1st round		2nd round	
Candidate	Party		Votes	%	Votes	%
Henriette Martinez	Union for a Popular Movement	UMP	14,736	39.81%	18,621	51.77%
Karine Berger	Socialist Party	PS	7,972	21.54%	17,345	48.23%
Jean-Michel Arnaud	Democratic Movement	MoDem	6,244	16.87%		
Jean-Claude Eyraud	Far Left	EXG	3,434	9.28%		
Marie Tarbouriech	The Greens	VEC	1,269	3.43%		
Martine Lelievre	National Front	FN	1,093	2.95%		
Patrick Faure	Hunting, Fishing, Nature, Traditions	CPNT	682	1.84%		
Marcelle Schwendemann	Ecologist	ECO	359	0.97%		
Colette Faure	Movement for France	MPF	339	0.92%		
Elisabeth Thomas	Far Left	EXG	306	0.83%		
Brigitte Krief	Divers	DIV	249	0.67%		
Aurore Leforestier	Far Right	EXD	142	0.38%		
Denis Dupre	Ecologist	ECO	135	0.36%		
Jacques Daudon	Divers	DIV	57	0.15%		
Total			37,017	100%	35,966	100%
Registered voters			57,668		57,664	
Blank/Void ballots			760	2.01%	1,517	4.05%
Turnout			37,777	65.51%	37,483	65.00%
Abstentions			19,891	34.49%	20,181	35.00%
Result					UMP HOLD	

=== 2002 ===
Legislative Election 2002: Hautes-Alpes's 1st constituency
Party	Candidate	Votes	%	±%
PS	Daniel Chevallier	10,200	28.51	
UMP	Henriette Martinez	8,337	23.30	
UDF	Jean-Michel Arnaud	5,876	16.42	
FN	Martine Lelievre-Maaziz	2,785	7.78	
DL	Jean-Louis Geiger	2,723	7.61	
PCF	Jean-Jacques Ferrero	1,691	4.73	
LV	Marie-Christine Bouchez	1,063	2.97	
CPNT	Patrick Faure	862	2.41	
Others	N/A	2,246		
Turnout		36,654	69.36	
2nd round result
UMP	Henriette Martinez	17,655	52.70	
PS	Daniel Chevallier	15,847	47.30	
Turnout		35,375	66.95	
UMP gain from PS				

=== 1997 ===
Legislative Election 1997: Hautes-Alpes's 1st constituency
Party	Candidate	Votes	%	±%
RPR	Henriette Martinez	11,027	34.11	
PS	Daniel Chevallier	10,230	31.65	
FN	Michel Mattei	3,907	12.09	
PCF	Florence Vercueil	3,342	10.34	
LV	Patrick Marsauche	1,703	5.27	
LDI	Claude Arnaud	935	2.89	
Others	N/A	1,183		
Turnout		34,296	70.06	
2nd round result
PS	Daniel Chevallier	17,976	51.26	
RPR	Henriette Martinez	17,094	48.47	
Turnout		37,358	76.32	
PS gain from RPR				

== Sources ==
- Official results of French elections from 1998: "Résultats électoraux officiels en France" (in French). Archived from the original on 20 December 2011.
