= Châteauroux-les-Alpes =

Châteauroux-les-Alpes Chasteurós los Aups (Occitan)
- Commune
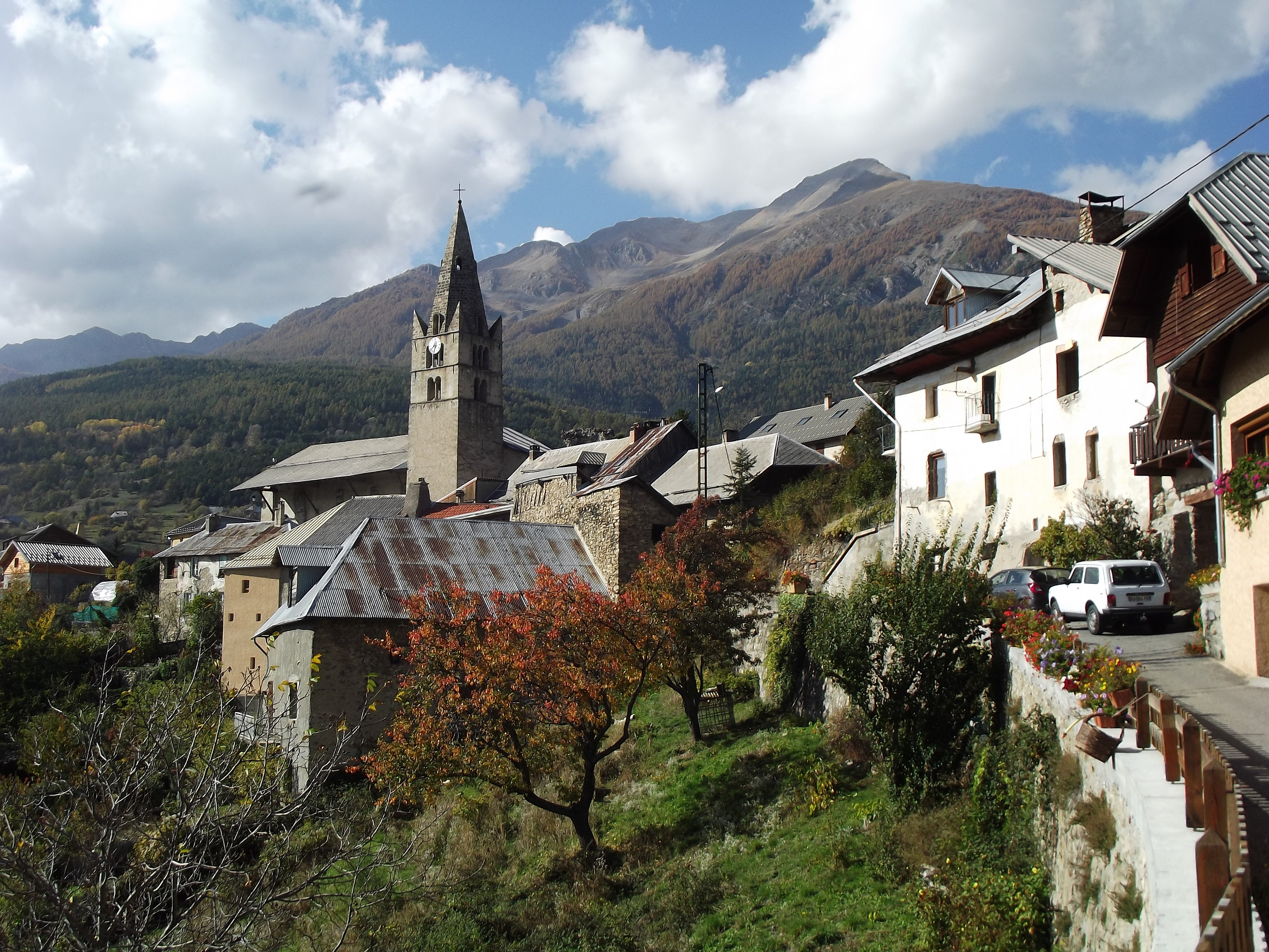
- The village of Saint-Marcellin, in Châteauroux-les-Alpes

- Coat of arms
- Location of Châteauroux-les-Alpes
- Location within France Location within Provence-Alpes-Côte d'Azur
- Coordinates: 44°36′55″N 6°31′21″E
- Country: France
- Region: Provence-Alpes-Côte d'Azur
- Department: Hautes-Alpes
- Arrondissement: Gap
- Canton: Embrun

Government
  - Mayor (2026–32): Lydie Rignon
- Area^{1}: 92.84 km^{2} (35.85 sq mi)
- Elevation: 928 m (3,045 ft)
- Highest elevation: 3,120 m (10,240 ft)
- Lowest elevation: 811 m (2,661 ft)
- Population (2023): 1,234
  - Density: 13.29/km^{2} (34.43/sq mi)
- Time zone: UTC+01:00 (CET)
  - Summer (DST): UTC+02:00 (CEST)
- INSEE/Postal code: 05036 /05380
- ^{1} French Land Register data, which excludes lakes, ponds, glaciers > 1 km^{2} (0.386 sq mi or 247 acres) and river estuaries.

Châteauroux-les-Alpes (French pronunciation: [ʃɑtoʁu lez‿alp]; Occitan: Chasteurós los Aups, before 1996: Châteauroux) is a commune in the Hautes-Alpes department, administrative region of Provence-Alpes-Côte d'Azur, southeastern France.

== Population ==
Historical population
Year	Pop.	±% p.a.
1968	683	—
1975	578	−2.36%
1982	649	+1.67%
1990	766	+2.09%
1999	927	+2.14%
2007	1,097	+2.13%
2012	1,116	+0.34%
2017	1,197	+1.41%
2023	1,234	+0.51%
Source: INSEE

== See also ==
- Communes of the Hautes-Alpes department
