= Crévoux =

- Commune
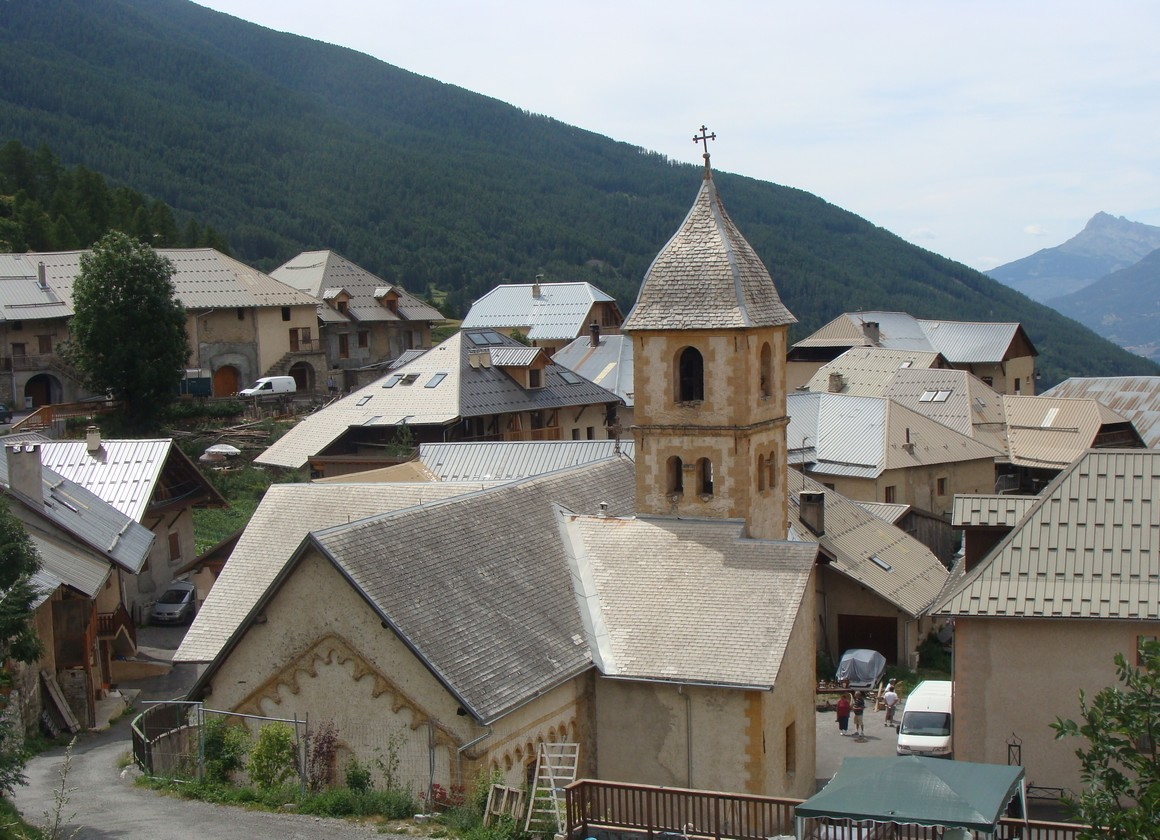
- The church and the surrounding village of Crévoux

- Coat of arms
- Location of Crévoux
- Location within France Location within Provence-Alpes-Côte d'Azur
- Coordinates: 44°32′56″N 6°36′29″E
- Country: France
- Region: Provence-Alpes-Côte d'Azur
- Department: Hautes-Alpes
- Arrondissement: Gap
- Canton: Embrun

Government
  - Mayor (2026–32): Audrey Lejeune
- Area^{1}: 56.26 km^{2} (21.72 sq mi)
- Elevation: 1,575 m (5,167 ft)
- Highest elevation: 2,989 m (9,806 ft)
- Lowest elevation: 1,169 m (3,835 ft)
- Population (2023): 122
  - Density: 2.17/km^{2} (5.62/sq mi)
- Time zone: UTC+01:00 (CET)
  - Summer (DST): UTC+02:00 (CEST)
- INSEE/Postal code: 05044 /05200
- ^{1} French Land Register data, which excludes lakes, ponds, glaciers > 1 km^{2} (0.386 sq mi or 247 acres) and river estuaries.

Crévoux (French pronunciation: [kʁevu]; Occitan: Crevós) is a commune in the Hautes-Alpes department in southeastern France.

== Population ==
Historical population
Year	Pop.	±% p.a.
1968	131	—
1975	127	−0.44%
1982	115	−1.41%
1990	117	+0.22%
1999	103	−1.41%
2007	127	+2.65%
2012	134	+1.08%
2017	130	−0.60%
2023	122	−1.05%
Source: INSEE

== See also ==
- Communes of the Hautes-Alpes department
