= Victor Peytral =

French politician

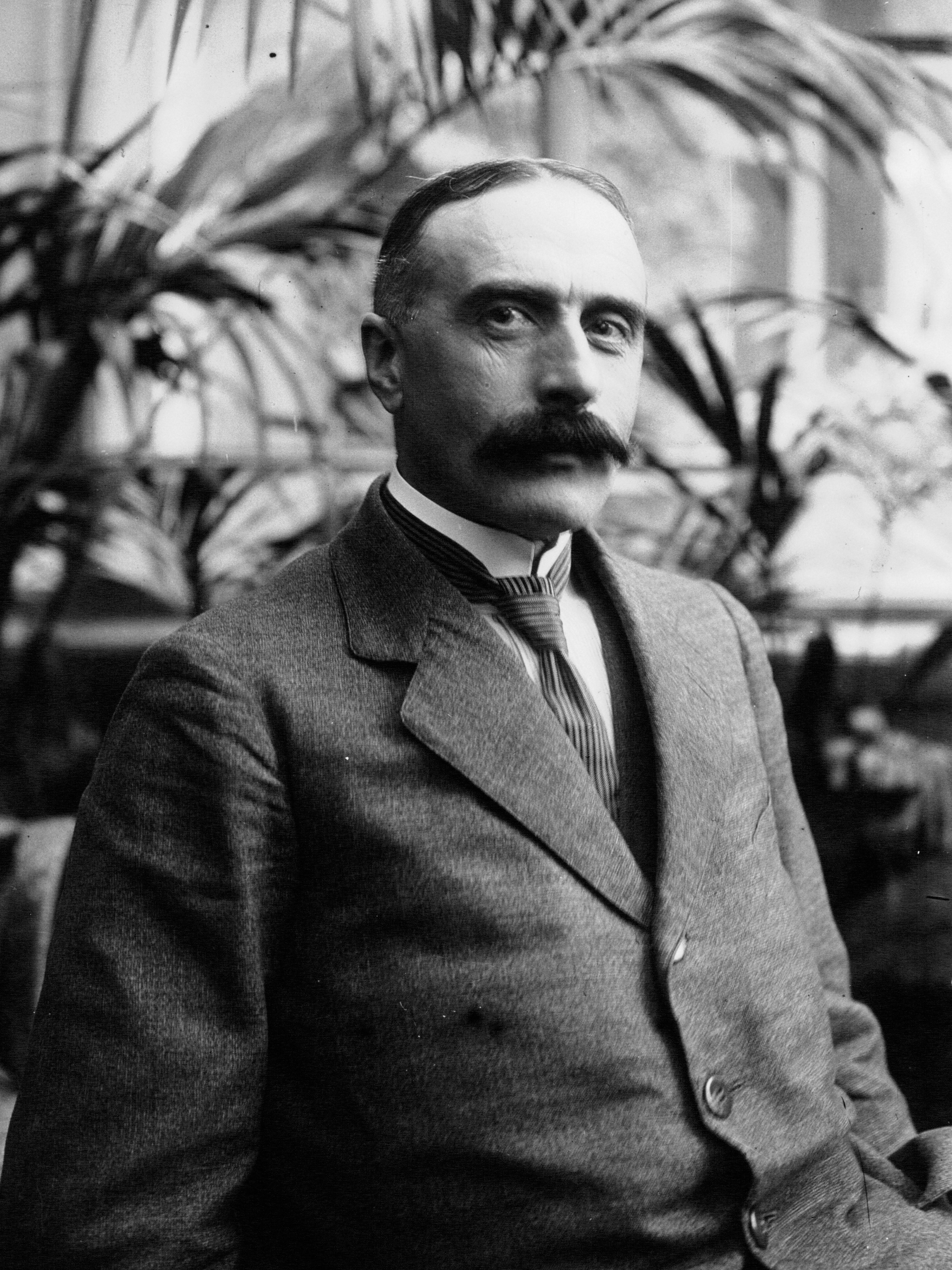
Victor Peytral

Victor Peytral (1876-1954) was a French politician. He served as a member of the National Assembly of France from 1912 to 1919 and as French Senator from 1920 to 1930. He also served as Under-Secretary of the Interior from September 12, 1917, to November 16, 1917, and as Minister of Public Works from June 14, 1924, to April 17, 1925.

== Biography ==
Victor Peytral was born on October 18, 1874, in Marseille, Bouches-du-Rhône, France.

He served as a member of the National Assembly of France from 1912 to 1919 and as French Senator from 1920 to 1930. He also served as Under-Secretary of the Interior from September 12, 1917, to November 16, 1917, and as Minister of Public Works from June 14, 1924, to April 17, 1925.

He died on April 19, 1964, in Draguignan, Var, France.
