= Henriette Martinez =

French politician

- Parliamentary group: Rally for the Republic (1993-1997); Union for a Popular Movement (2002-2012)

Deputy for Hautes-Alpes' 1st constituency in the National Assembly of France
- In office 1993–1997
- Preceded by: Daniel Chevallier
- Succeeded by: Daniel Chevallier

Deputy for Hautes-Alpes' 1st constituency in the National Assembly of France
- In office 2002–2012
- Preceded by: Daniel Chevallier
- Succeeded by: Karine Berger

Personal details
- Born: 10 July 1949 (age 76)

Henriette Martinez (born 10 July 1949 in Laragne-Montéglin, Hautes-Alpes) was a member of the National Assembly of France. She represented Hautes-Alpes' 1st constituency, as a member of the Rally for the Republic from 1993 to 1997 and again as a member of Union for a Popular Movement from 2002 to 2012.
