= Karine Berger =

French politician (born 1973)

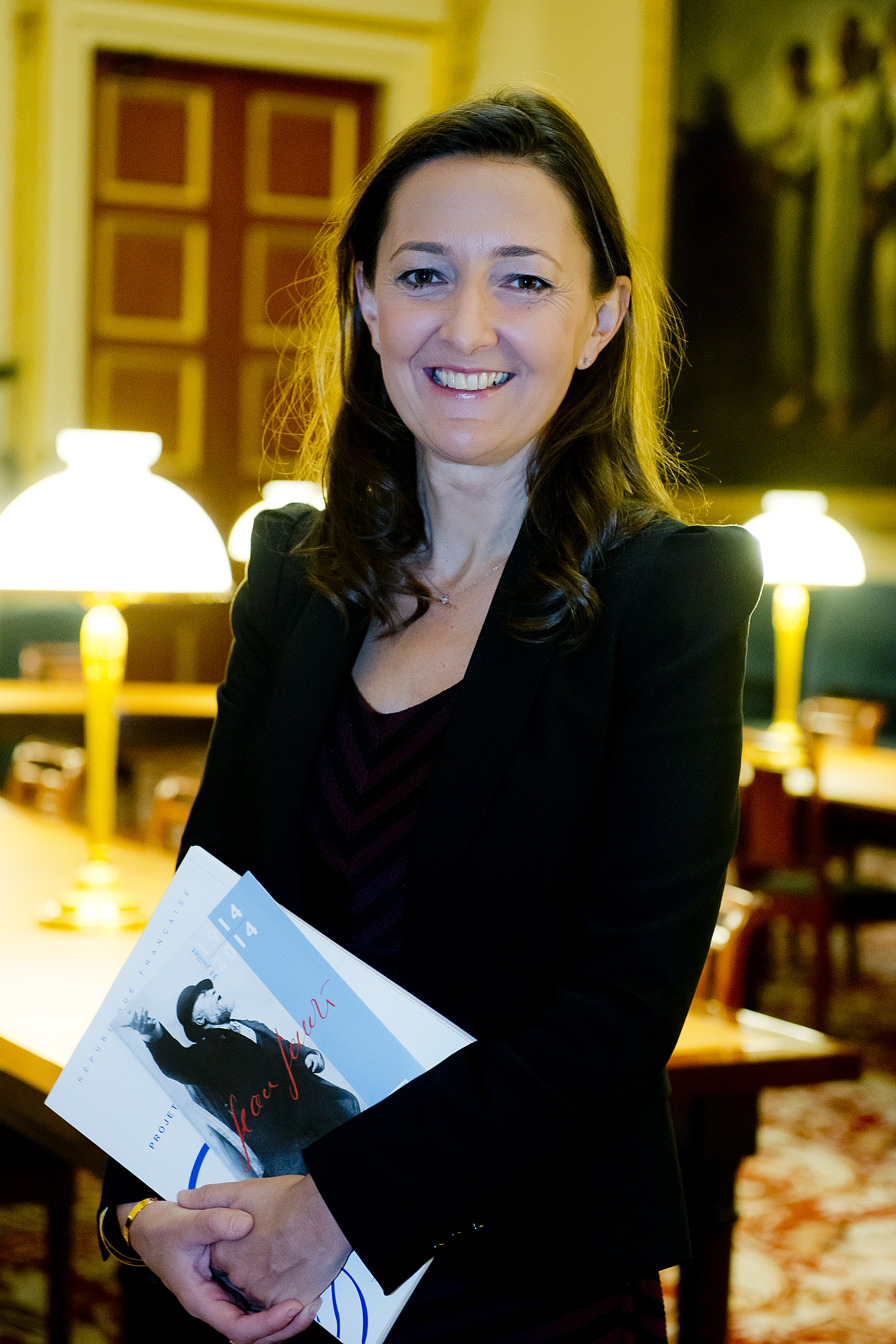

Member of the National Assembly for Hautes-Alpes's 1st constituency
- In office 20 June 2012 – 20 June 2017
- Preceded by: Henriette Martinez
- Succeeded by: Pascale Boyer

Personal details
- Born: 11 March 1973 (age 53) Limoges, France
- Party: Socialist Party
- Education: Lycée Louis-le-Grand
- Alma mater: École Polytechnique; ENSAE ParisTech; Sciences Po

Karine Berger (born 11 March 1973) is a French politician, member of the French National Assembly representing Hautes-Alpes between 2012 and 2017. She was the national secretary for the economy of the French Socialist Party.

== Political career ==
Berger won her seat at the 2012 parliamentary election.

Ahead of the Socialist Party's 2017 primaries, Berger endorsed Vincent Peillon as the party's candidate for the presidential election later that year.

In 2017 Berger lost her seat by a landslide, coming in fifth place in the first round. Her seat was won by En Marche candidate Pascale Boyer.
