= Cantons of the Hautes-Alpes department =

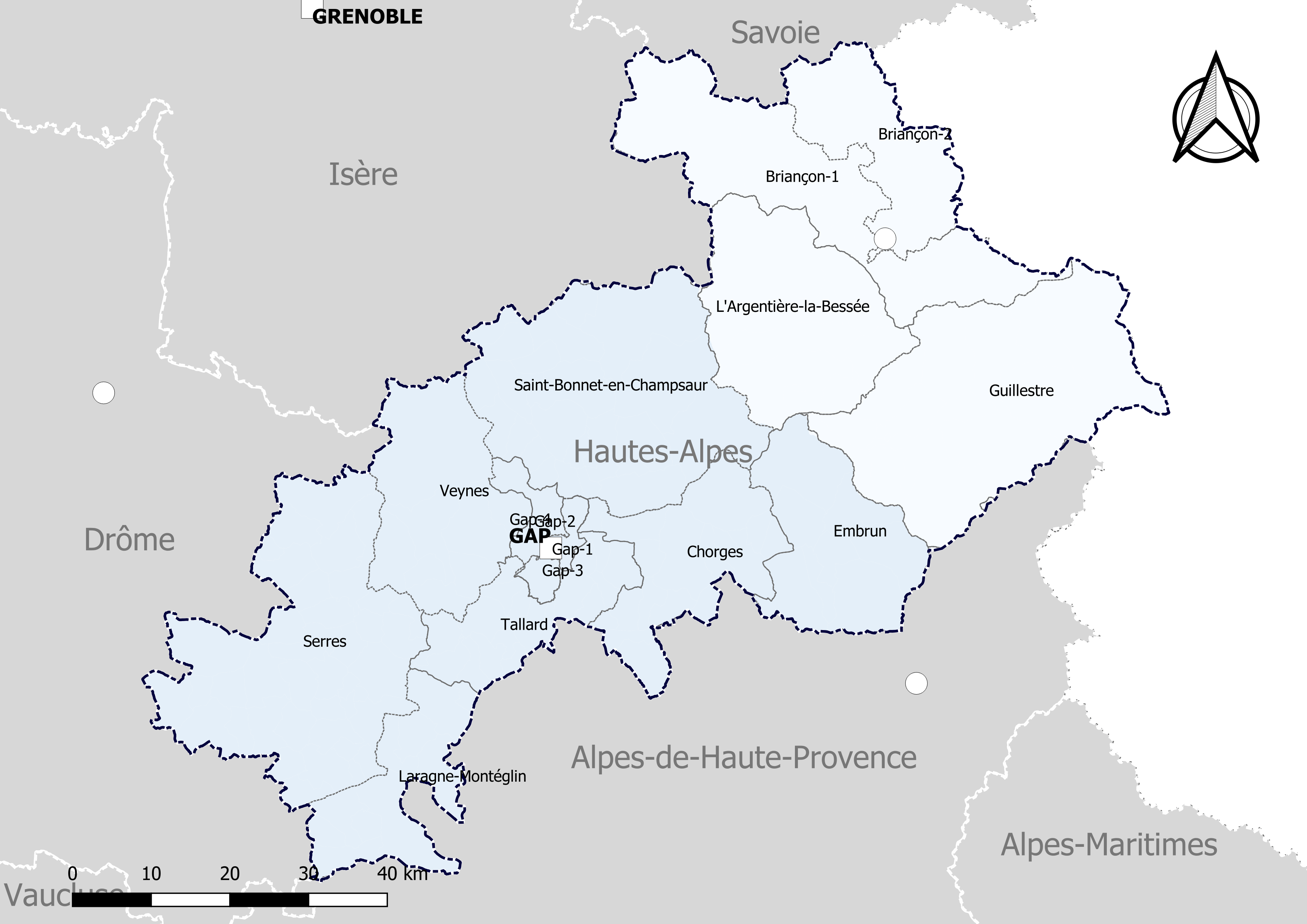
A map of the cantons of Hautes-Alpes

The following is a list of the 15 cantons of the Hautes-Alpes department (with their respective seats), in France, following the canton reorganisation that came into effect in March 2015:

- L'Argentière-la-Bessée (L'Argentière-la-Bessée): 8 communes
- Briançon-1 (Briançon): 9 communes and part of Briançon
- Briançon-2 (Briançon): 3 communes and part of Briançon
- Chorges (Chorges): 17 communes
- Embrun (Embrun): 8 communes
- Gap-1 (Gap): part of Gap
- Gap-2 (Gap): part of Gap
- Gap-3 (Gap): part of Gap
- Gap-4 (Gap): part of Gap
- Guillestre (Guillestre): 16 communes
- Laragne-Montéglin (Laragne-Montéglin): 11 communes
- Saint-Bonnet-en-Champsaur (Saint-Bonnet-en-Champsaur): 25 communes
- Serres (Serres): 37 communes
- Tallard (Tallard): 19 communes
- Veynes (Veynes): 8 communes
