= Crots =

- Commune
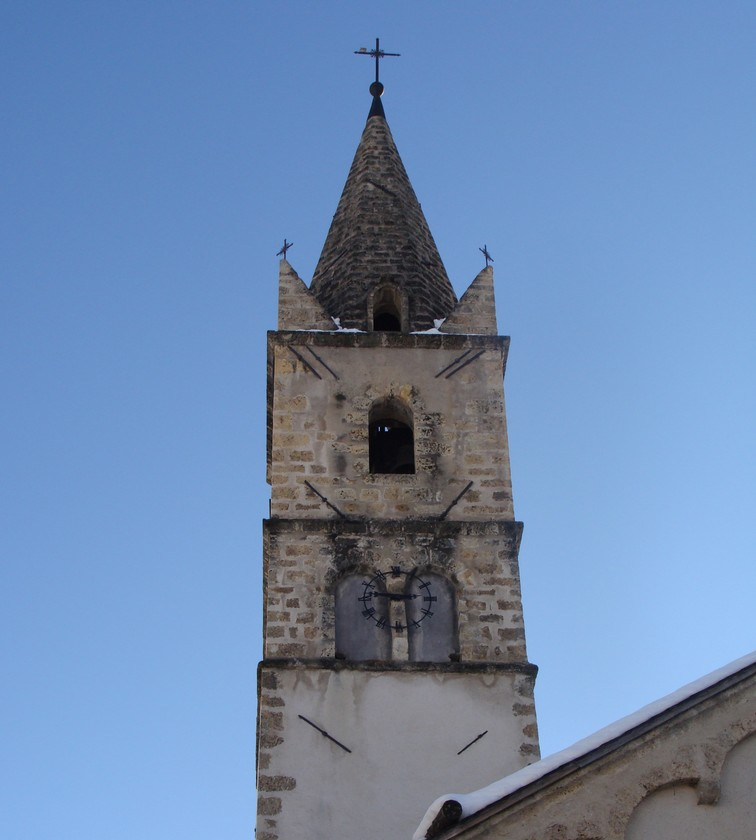
- The bell tower of the church in Crots

- Coat of arms
- Location of Crots
- Location within France Location within Provence-Alpes-Côte d'Azur
- Coordinates: 44°32′04″N 6°28′19″E
- Country: France
- Region: Provence-Alpes-Côte d'Azur
- Department: Hautes-Alpes
- Arrondissement: Gap
- Canton: Embrun

Government
  - Mayor (2026–32): Jean-Pierre Gandois
- Area^{1}: 53.84 km^{2} (20.79 sq mi)
- Elevation: 790 m (2,590 ft)
- Highest elevation: 2,896 m (9,501 ft)
- Lowest elevation: 778 m (2,552 ft)
- Population (2023): 1,195
  - Density: 22.20/km^{2} (57.49/sq mi)
- Time zone: UTC+01:00 (CET)
  - Summer (DST): UTC+02:00 (CEST)
- INSEE/Postal code: 05045 /05200
- ^{1} French Land Register data, which excludes lakes, ponds, glaciers > 1 km^{2} (0.386 sq mi or 247 acres) and river estuaries.

Crots (French pronunciation: [kʁo]; Occitan: Las Cròtas) is a commune in the Hautes-Alpes department in southeastern France. The territory of the commune belongs to the Écrins National Park.

== Population ==
Historical population
Year	Pop.	±% p.a.
1968	463	—
1975	469	+0.18%
1982	563	+2.64%
1990	670	+2.20%
1999	744	+1.17%
2007	906	+2.49%
2012	985	+1.69%
2017	1,075	+1.76%
2023	1,195	+1.78%
Source: INSEE

== See also ==
- Communes of the Hautes-Alpes department
