= Canton of Embrun =

Coordinates: 44°33′57″N 6°29′46″E

Embrun
- Canton
- Country: France
- Region: Provence-Alpes-Côte d'Azur
- Department: Hautes-Alpes
- No. of communes: {{{nbcomm}}}
- Area: 392.92 km^{2} (151.71 sq mi)
- Population (2023): 11,307
  - Density: 28.777/km^{2} (74.532/sq mi)
- INSEE code: 05 05

The canton of Embrun is an administrative division in southeastern France. It includes the following communes:

- Baratier
- Châteauroux-les-Alpes
- Crévoux
- Crots
- Embrun
- Les Orres
- Saint-André-d'Embrun
- Saint-Sauveur

== Demographics ==
Historical population
Year	Pop.	±% p.a.
2013	10,495	—
2018	11,003	+0.95%
Source: INSEE

== See also ==
- Cantons of the Hautes-Alpes department
