= Pierre Bernard-Reymond =

French politician

Pierre Bernard-Reymond (born 16 January 1944 in Gap, Hautes-Alpes) was a member of the Senate of France, representing the Hautes-Alpes department as a member of the Union for a Popular Movement.

== Bibliography ==
- Page on the Senate website
