= Cantons of Gap =

Coordinates: 44.56°N 6.08°E

The cantons of Gap are administrative divisions of the Hautes-Alpes department, in southeastern France. Since the French canton reorganisation which came into effect in March 2015, the town of Gap is subdivided into 4 cantons. Their seat is in Gap.

== Population ==
Name	Population (2019)	Cantonal Code
Canton of Gap-1	10,426	0506
Canton of Gap-2	10,395	0507
Canton of Gap-3	10,238	0508
Canton of Gap-4	9,572	0509
