= Canton of Aiguilles =

Coordinates: 44°46′57″N 6°52′11″E

Canton d'Aiguilles
- Former canton
- Interactive map of Canton d'Aiguilles
- Country: France
- Region: Provence-Alpes-Côte d'Azur
- Department: Hautes-Alpes
- No. of communes: {{{nbcomm}}}
- Disbanded: 2015
- Area: 437.36 km^{2} (168.87 sq mi)
- Population (2012): 2,145
  - Density: 4.904/km^{2} (12.70/sq mi)

The canton of Aiguilles is a former administrative division in southeastern France. It was disbanded following the French canton reorganisation which came into effect in March 2015. It consisted of 7 communes, which joined the canton of Guillestre in 2015. It had 2,145 inhabitants (2012).

The canton comprised the following communes:

- Abriès
- Aiguilles
- Arvieux
- Château-Ville-Vieille
- Molines-en-Queyras
- Ristolas
- Saint-Véran

== Demographics ==
Historical population Canton of Aiguilles
Year	1962	1968	1975	1982	1990	1999
Pop.	1,611	1,674	1,677	1,902	1,948	2,138
±%	—	+3.9%	+0.2%	+13.4%	+2.4%	+9.8%
From the year 1962 on: No double counting – residents of multiple communes (e.g. students and military personnel) are counted only once. Source: INSEE

== See also ==
- Cantons of the Hautes-Alpes department
