= Arvieux =

- Commune
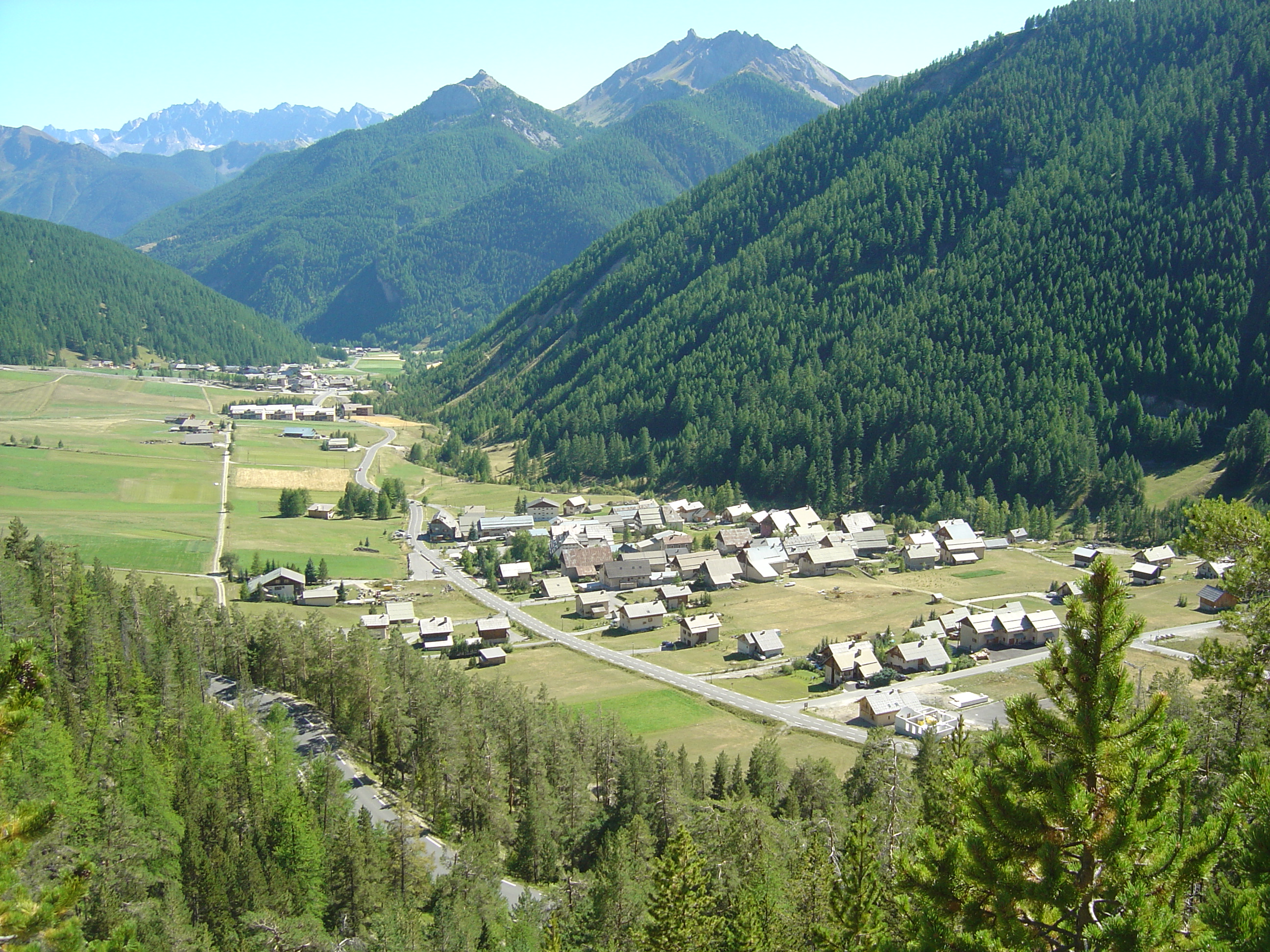
- The valley between Brunissard and Arvieux

- Coat of arms
- Location of Arvieux
- Location within France Location within Provence-Alpes-Côte d'Azur
- Coordinates: 44°46′02″N 6°44′23″E
- Country: France
- Region: Provence-Alpes-Côte d'Azur
- Department: Hautes-Alpes
- Arrondissement: Briançon
- Canton: Guillestre
- Intercommunality: Guillestrois et Queyras

Government
  - Mayor (2026–32): Christian Blanc
- Area^{1}: 72.62 km^{2} (28.04 sq mi)
- Elevation: 1,545 m (5,069 ft)
- Highest elevation: 2,905 m (9,531 ft)
- Lowest elevation: 1,138 m (3,734 ft)
- Population (2023): 340
  - Density: 4.7/km^{2} (12/sq mi)
- Time zone: UTC+01:00 (CET)
  - Summer (DST): UTC+02:00 (CEST)
- INSEE/Postal code: 05007 /05350
- ^{1} French Land Register data, which excludes lakes, ponds, glaciers > 1 km^{2} (0.386 sq mi or 247 acres) and river estuaries.

Arvieux (French pronunciation: [aʁvjø]; Occitan: Arvieus) is a commune of the Hautes-Alpes department in the Provence-Alpes-Côte d'Azur region of south-eastern France.

== Geography ==
Arvieux lies at the foot of the Col d'Izoard in the Arvieux Valley some 20 km south by south-east of Briançon and 13 km east by north-east of La Roche-de-Rame. It is surrounded by the high mountains of the Massif du Queyras whose highest point is in the commune at Pic du Béal Traversier at 2912 m. Access to the commune is by the D902 from Cervières in the north which goes by a tortuous route through the commune to the village then continues south-east to Guillestre. Apart from the village there are the hamlets of La Draye, Brunissard La Chalp, and Le Coin north of the village and La Cassiere, Les Maisons, Le Pasquier, Villargaudin, Les Moulins, Les Escoyeres, and Les Esponces south of the village. The commune is a high alpine commune with snow-covered mountains and rugged terrain.

Details of some of the hamlets are:

- Les Escoyères, the first hamlet, is located at the end of a small winding road starting west of the Guil valley and is 1,532 m above sea level on a south-facing slope. The Chapel of St. Mary Magdalene, built in the 17th century, whose door lintels are made with a Roman stele (see History section) and two sundials by Giovanni Francesco Zarbula are there.
- Villargaudin or Villard-Gaudin is at 1593 m altitude on another road to the west at the bottom of the valley after the Queyron.
- Les Moulins (The Mills) is at 1410 m and was so named because there were once several mills here built to use the power of the Aigue d'Arvieux.
- Le Pasquier is located at 1570 m altitude at mid-slope on the eastern side.

Les Maisons is located at 1690 m a little higher on the same side of the valley.

- Arvieux village at 1550 m is in the centre of the valley. It is the capital of the commune. The St Lawrence Church dating from the 16th century and the Protestant church are located there. The village can be accessed on foot from Furfande.
- Le Coin is a small hamlet at 1600 m west of Arvieux.
- La Chalp is 2 km north of Arvieux and is the highest in the valley at 1680 m altitude. La Chalp is a common name in the Alps and means pastureland. There is a mountain resort here.
- Brunissard is the last village of the commune situated amidst meadows which rise to 1760 m altitude. The valley is separated into two with the north-west branch the path to the Col des Ayes, the alpine pastures of Clapeyto and the Col de Néal; the north-east branch leads to the Col d'Isoard (or Izoard).

The commune also has several hamlets consisting of alpine chalets. The most important are those of Furfande and Clapeyto.

The Guil forms the southern border as it flows south-west to join the Durance at Réotier. The Torrent de l'Izoard rises in the north of the commune and flows south through the centre fed by many tributaries, changing to the Torrent de la Rivière at Brunissard then back to the Torrent de l'Izoard at Le Coin, as it continues south to join the Guil. The Torrent de la Rabanelle rises in the west of the commune and flows east to join the Torrent de la Rivière at Brunissard.

=== Climate ===
Arvieux has a humid continental climate (Köppen climate classification Dfb). The average annual temperature in Arvieux is 5.5 °C (41.9 °F). The average annual rainfall is 858.9 mm (33.81 in) with October as the wettest month. The temperatures are highest on average in July, at around 14.6 °C (58.3 °F), and lowest in January, at around −2.5 °C (27.5 °F). The highest temperature ever recorded in Arvieux was 32.2 °C (90.0 °F) on 26 June 2019; the coldest temperature ever recorded was −28.7 °C (−19.7 °F) on 10 February 1986.

Climate data for Arvieux la Chalp, 1690m (1991−2020 normals, extremes 1951−present)
Month	Jan	Feb	Mar	Apr	May	Jun	Jul	Aug	Sep	Oct	Nov	Dec	Year
Record high °C (°F)	16.4 (61.5)	17.0 (62.6)	19.5 (67.1)	22.8 (73.0)	26.3 (79.3)	32.2 (90.0)	31.5 (88.7)	33.4 (92.1)	30.4 (86.7)	26.0 (78.8)	20.5 (68.9)	18.2 (64.8)	33.4 (92.1)
Mean daily maximum °C (°F)	3.4 (38.1)	4.7 (40.5)	7.8 (46.0)	10.7 (51.3)	15.2 (59.4)	19.8 (67.6)	22.7 (72.9)	22.6 (72.7)	18.3 (64.9)	13.5 (56.3)	7.4 (45.3)	3.8 (38.8)	12.5 (54.5)
Daily mean °C (°F)	−2.1 (28.2)	−1.6 (29.1)	1.6 (34.9)	4.5 (40.1)	8.7 (47.7)	12.5 (54.5)	14.9 (58.8)	14.9 (58.8)	11.1 (52.0)	7.2 (45.0)	2.1 (35.8)	−1.3 (29.7)	6.0 (42.9)
Mean daily minimum °C (°F)	−7.5 (18.5)	−7.8 (18.0)	−4.6 (23.7)	−1.6 (29.1)	2.2 (36.0)	5.3 (41.5)	7.1 (44.8)	7.2 (45.0)	3.9 (39.0)	0.9 (33.6)	−3.2 (26.2)	−6.5 (20.3)	−0.4 (31.3)
Record low °C (°F)	−22.0 (−7.6)	−28.7 (−19.7)	−25.0 (−13.0)	−16.8 (1.8)	−11.0 (12.2)	−6.0 (21.2)	−1.5 (29.3)	−2.6 (27.3)	−6.0 (21.2)	−12.5 (9.5)	−18.0 (−0.4)	−21.2 (−6.2)	−28.7 (−19.7)
Average precipitation mm (inches)	58.1 (2.29)	47.8 (1.88)	54.4 (2.14)	68.5 (2.70)	74.6 (2.94)	82.5 (3.25)	67.4 (2.65)	69.3 (2.73)	75.5 (2.97)	105.1 (4.14)	98.7 (3.89)	72.7 (2.86)	874.6 (34.44)
Average precipitation days (≥ 1.0 mm)	6.5	5.7	6.7	8.9	9.7	9.6	8.3	7.9	7.4	8.9	8.2	7.3	95.1
Source: Meteociel

Climate data for Arvieux Brunissard, 1825m (1991−2020 normals, extremes 2007−present)
Month	Jan	Feb	Mar	Apr	May	Jun	Jul	Aug	Sep	Oct	Nov	Dec	Year
Record high °C (°F)	16.8 (62.2)	17.8 (64.0)	16.9 (62.4)	20.3 (68.5)	24.1 (75.4)	30.4 (86.7)	29.4 (84.9)	30.6 (87.1)	27.1 (80.8)	22.6 (72.7)	19.4 (66.9)	14.8 (58.6)	30.6 (87.1)
Mean daily maximum °C (°F)	3.5 (38.3)	3.9 (39.0)	6.3 (43.3)	9.8 (49.6)	13.5 (56.3)	18.5 (65.3)	21.5 (70.7)	21.4 (70.5)	17.4 (63.3)	12.8 (55.0)	6.8 (44.2)	4.0 (39.2)	11.6 (52.9)
Daily mean °C (°F)	−1.2 (29.8)	−1.2 (29.8)	1.3 (34.3)	4.8 (40.6)	8.2 (46.8)	12.7 (54.9)	15.2 (59.4)	15.1 (59.2)	11.4 (52.5)	7.6 (45.7)	2.6 (36.7)	−0.5 (31.1)	6.3 (43.4)
Mean daily minimum °C (°F)	−6.0 (21.2)	−6.4 (20.5)	−3.6 (25.5)	−0.2 (31.6)	2.9 (37.2)	6.9 (44.4)	8.9 (48.0)	8.9 (48.0)	5.5 (41.9)	2.4 (36.3)	−1.7 (28.9)	−4.9 (23.2)	1.1 (33.9)
Record low °C (°F)	−16.1 (3.0)	−19.0 (−2.2)	−15.3 (4.5)	−10.7 (12.7)	−7.0 (19.4)	0.2 (32.4)	0.0 (32.0)	0.2 (32.4)	−4.6 (23.7)	−10.5 (13.1)	−15.9 (3.4)	−17.0 (1.4)	−19.0 (−2.2)
Average precipitation mm (inches)	58.5 (2.30)	57.9 (2.28)	58.8 (2.31)	72.2 (2.84)	93.3 (3.67)	83.3 (3.28)	70.0 (2.76)	77.8 (3.06)	58.5 (2.30)	87.9 (3.46)	113.9 (4.48)	88.5 (3.48)	920.6 (36.22)
Average precipitation days (≥ 1.0 mm)	6.6	7.5	6.7	9.1	12.6	11.1	8.9	8.0	6.4	7.2	9.5	8.1	101.8
Source: Meteociel

== Toponymy ==
The name Arvieux comes from the Latin arviolum meaning "small field".

The Campanile Brunissard is one of the oldest monuments in the village and the Izoard Valley. It reflects aspects of the historical economic, cultural and social life of the Hautes-Alpes region, particularly the Quesyras area.

== History ==
=== Antiquity ===
The ancient history of Arvieux is not well known. Occupied since antiquity, Arvieux was the first valley which was reached when passing through the Col Néal which was probably the ancient access route to the upper Queyras. The second access road, probably dominant, linked directly to the Durance basin at Queyras via a Roman road that ran from the hamlet of Gros passing through Escoyères which was probably in Roman times a place of testing "taxes". Part of this pathway, under overhanging cliffs, is still visible today (the Chemin de Charve).

During antiquity the area was inhabited by Gallic people called Quariates by the Romans whose name is probably formed from a Celtic root meaning "those of the cauldron" and from which Queyras is derived. The name Quariates is attested on a Roman stone found in the Chapel of Sainte-Marie-Madeleine at Escoyères. On this truncated stone there is a Latin inscription which mentions a man named Albanus Bussulus who was prefect of Capillates, Savincates (probably people living in the Savines valley), Brigani (people from Briançon), and Quariates.

=== Middle Ages - the Escarton of Queyras ===
The region suffered several invasions after the end of the Roman Empire with many Saracen incursions. Some say that on this occasion Queyras was deserted but an eventual abandonment that left no trace remains unlikely.

The Dauphins of Vienne received the Briançonnais and therefore the Queyras in fief in 1050. Arvieux was then part of the Kingdom of Dauphiné. The Briançonnais were divided into five entities called Escartons of which Queyras was part. Each Escarton was composed of communities called "universities". Arvieux was then one of the seven universities of Queyras, the others being: Abriès, Aiguilles, Molines, Ristolas, Saint-Véran, and Vielle-Ville.

At the end of the Middle Ages the Dauphin Humbert II, while short of money, gave a little more independence to the Escartons in exchange for an annual rent. Arvieux became part of what was later called abusively the Republic of Escartons.

This feudal entity was specifically created by the Charter signed in 1343 between the Dauphin and the Briançon communities. The Escarton of Queyras was an administrative unit responsible for collecting taxes. The Escarton Communities obtained from the Dauphin the right to manage paying their taxes themselves.

The Arvieux community was one of the seven "Universities" in the Escarton of Queyras and the capital was located at Ville-Vieille. There were a total of five Escartons.

The charter gave the inhabitants of the escartons the status of "francs-bourgeois", that is to say they were exempt from feudal service in exchange for an annual rent. The people had the right to elect their representatives called "consuls". They also had the right to hunt. Justice however remained a privilege of the Dauphin and the inhabitants of the escartons had to participate in the defence of the Dauphiné.

In 1349, six years after the signing of the charter, the Dauphiné was ceded to France who perpetuated these rights until the French Revolution. Under the ancien regime Arvieux was thus a relatively wealthy town in the French Alps. The relative prosperity of the village community was achieved despite numerous calamities. The wars of religion did not spare Arvieux. In 1630 the plague came from Italy and ravaged the region. The town was burned in 1638.

=== Modern era - Catholics and Protestants ===
Protestantism arrived in Arvieux during the second half of the 16th century. Queyrassins adhered in large numbers to the Reformation. Disorders occurred in the valley. After the Edict of Nantes Arvieux had a Protestant church. After the Revocation of the Edict of Nantes many people emigrated. During the war against the Catholic League of Augsburg from 1690 to 1696 Arvieux is crossed by the troops of the King of France and had to provide wood, fodder, food, and animals for the army. Militiamen from Vaud crossed the border several times and burned villages. Around 1700 Arvieux and Queyras generally was weakened but the region regained its prosperity before the Revolution.

The Revolution abolished the status of Escartons and the university of Arvieux became a commune. The Edict of Tolerance (1787) and the Revolution agreed to new freedoms of worship for Protestants.

=== Recent history ===
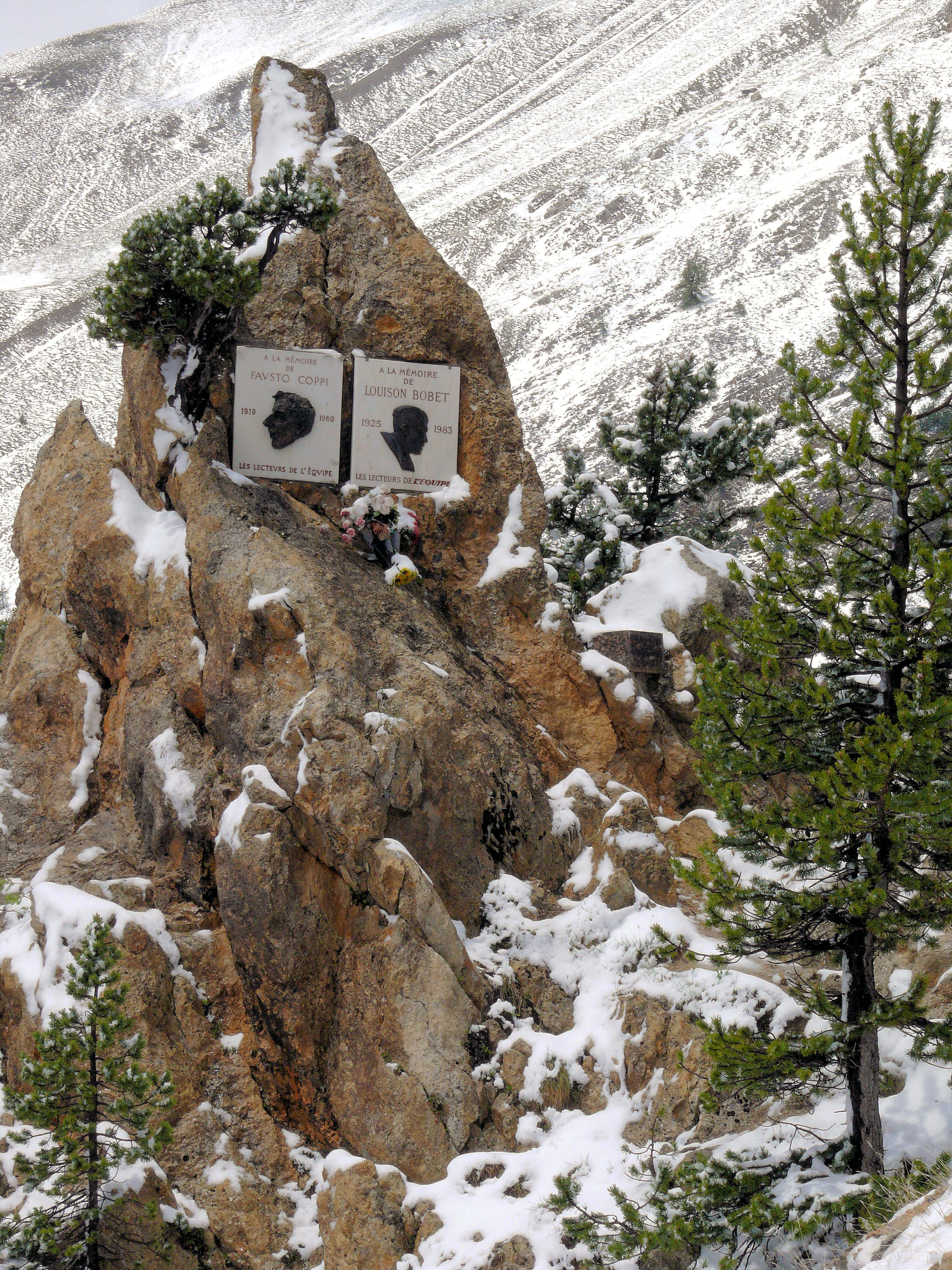
Monument to Fausto Coppi and Louison Bobet on the Col d'Izoard road

After the Revolution some of the inhabitants became officially Protestant and the inhabitants of Arvieux were divided between the two religious communities: the majority of Catholics were in the village of Arvieux and at the bottom of the valley while there were mainly Protestants in the present top of the valley at Brunissard and La Chalp which was the place of residence of their pastor.

Arvieux, as with all communes in Queyras suffered severe depopulation from 1830. First seasonally during the cold season, emigration became permanent in the middle of the 19th century. Having reached a maximum of 1,004 inhabitants in 1841, the population was reduced by two thirds in 150 years. The exodus, which stopped from that point, was to the cities (mainly Marseille). The difficult living conditions in the mountains as well as more specific calamities (Brunissard was completely destroyed by fire in 1882) explain this phenomenon. Nevertheless, to maintain perspective, Arvieux preserved its population more than any other in Queyras.

During the 20th century the economy was gradually transformed. Originally a fully agro-pastoral economy, it now relied mainly on tourism. This transition was nevertheless late in Arvieux and it was the commune in Queyras where agro-pastoral culture lasted the longest - up to about World War II.

By the relative weakness of emigration and by maintaining agro-pastoral activity for a relatively long time, Arvieux was a somewhat atypical commune in Queyras. This originality is probably related to the relative mild weather in the Arvieux Valley for agriculture compared to other communes in Queyras.

The use of French among the inhabitants is relatively recent in Arvieux as they spoke a dialect in the early 20th century. Literacy, however, was relatively advanced due to the Protestant culture of part of the population.

The opening of the Col d'Izoard in 1934 made the commune one of the highlights of the Tour de France. The pass is closed in winter.

In 1977 the Regional Natural Park of Queyras was established with Arvieux being one of the communes it covers.

=== The Belle and the Renon ===
Life in Arvieux was different for historians because of a unique organization. Arvieux society was historically divided into two castes:

1. The Gens du Renom or Race des Sorciers who were the lower caste people 2. The Gens de la Belle who formed a kind of local aristocracy

This distinction (which was not related to Protestants and Catholics) lasted until the town opened to the outside world in the second half of the 20th century. Its origin is uncertain but it did not prevent solidarity among villagers. In Arvieux, priority was given to widows and orphans.

=== Heraldry ===
Arms of Arvieux	These arms were adopted by the town council on 10 August 1968: the Mayor at that time was Louis Blanc-Chabrand Blazon: Azure, three fesses wavy Argent debruised by a dolphin of Or barbed, crested, eared, and scaled Gules.

== Administration ==
List of Successive Mayors

Mayors from the French Revolution to 1940

From	To	Name
1790	1891	Jacques Borel
1791	1792	Jacques Meissimilly
1792	1795	Laurent Albert
1795	1800	Jacques Laurent Eymar
1800	1805	Jacques Albert
1805	1809	Jacques Eymar
1809	1813	Jean Antoine Eymar
1813	1818	Jean Meissimilly
1818	1832	Claude Meissimilly
1832	1835	Jean Antoine Meissimilly
1835	1838	Jacques Simond
1838	1840	Claude Eymar
1840	1848	Claude Meissimilly
1848	1852	André Albert
1852	1860	Jean Eymar
1860	1871	Jean Garcin
1871	1892	Jean Désiré Blanc
1892	1896	Charles Nicolas Meissimily
1896	1902	Jean Laurent Albert
1902	1904	Charles Nicolas Meissimily
1904	1914	Jacques Philip
1914	1917	Antoine Eymar
1917	1929	Jacques Philip
1929	1937	Charles Simond
1937	1940	Jean-Baptiste Eymar

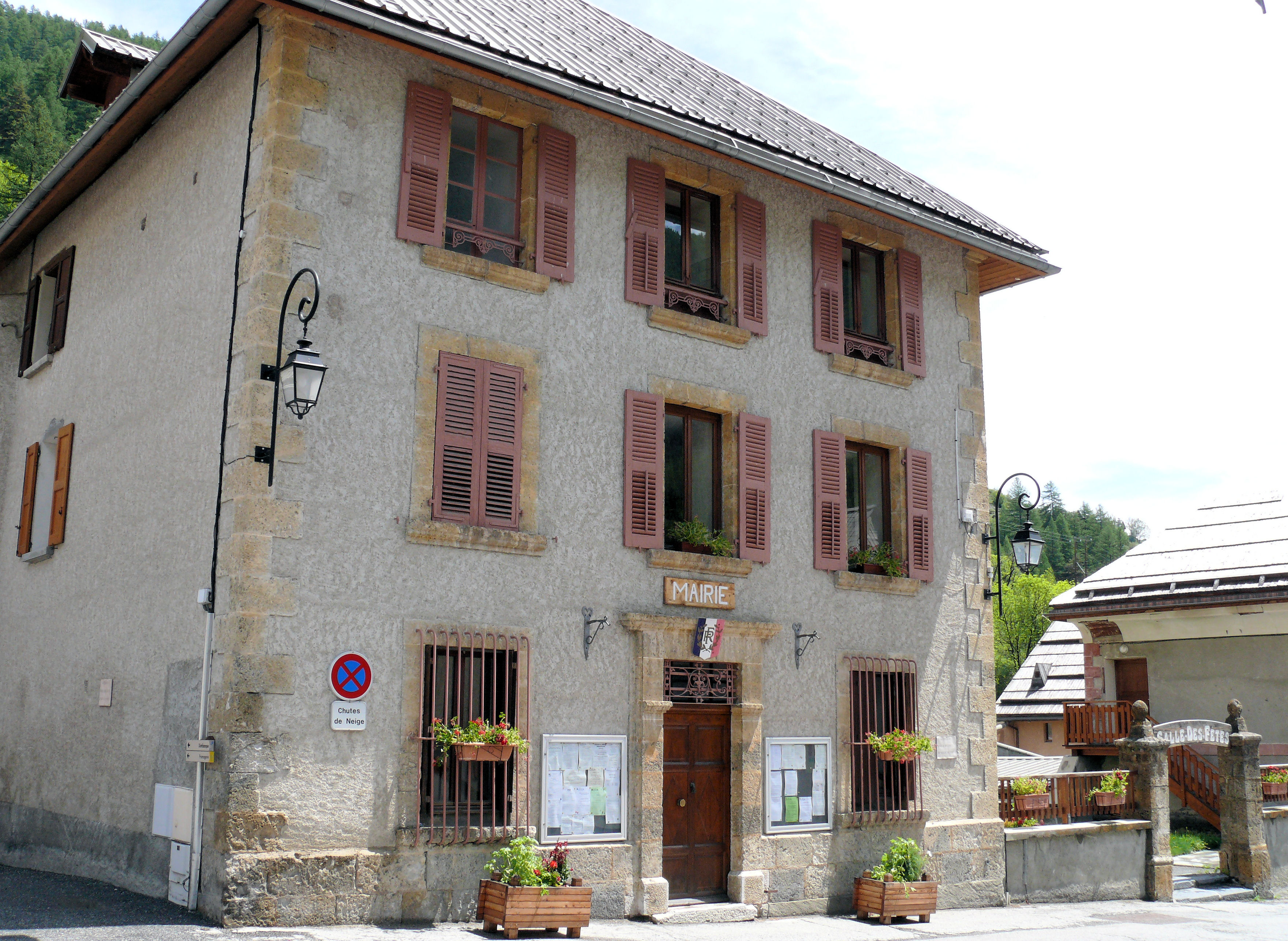
Arvieux Town Hall

Mayors from 1940

From	To	Name	Party
1940	1945	Pierre Borel	
1945	1947	Pierre Albert	
1947	1959	Laurent Nicolas Meissimily	
1959	1977	Louis Blanc Chabrand	
1977	1995	Pierre Blanc	
1995	2001	Alain Blanc	
2001	2008	Pierre Blanc	
2008	2014	Alain Blanc	DVG
2014	2020	Philippe Chabrand	LR
2020	Current	Christian Blanc	

== Population ==
The inhabitants of the commune are known as Arvidants or Arvidantes in French.

Historical population
Year	Pop.	±% p.a.
1968	412	—
1975	324	−3.37%
1982	351	+1.15%
1990	338	−0.47%
1999	355	+0.55%
2007	353	−0.07%
2012	371	+1.00%
2017	365	−0.33%
2023	340	−1.18%
Source: INSEE

== Economy ==
Arvieux has a tourism economy both in winter and summer. In winter there is alpine skiing, cross country skiing, and ski touring. Summer is the season for hiking. Crafts (pottery, manufacture of wooden toys of Queyras, carved furniture) and livestock (for cheese making) also have an important role.

== Culture and heritage ==
=== Civil heritage ===
The commune has many buildings and structures that are registered as historical monuments:

- The Fantin House (1731)
- The Route over the Col de l'Izoard (1710)
- A Bakery at Villargaudin (18th century)
- Le Veyer (13th century)
- A Flour Mill (1803)
- Furfande
- A Fountain Boundary Stone (1865)
- A Bakery at Les Escoyeres (18th century)
- The Cooperative Cheese Factory at Les Escoyeres (1927)
- A Bakery at Brunissard (18th century)
- The Town Hall (19th century)
- Arvieux Town

In addition the commune has a very large number of Farmhouses that are registered as historical monuments.

Other sites of interest

- The Bell Tower at Brunissard
- Many interesting Sundials. Two are located at Escoyėres and signed Zarbula: one from 1842 (Baroque) and one at Saint-Roch dated 1857 (period of birds).
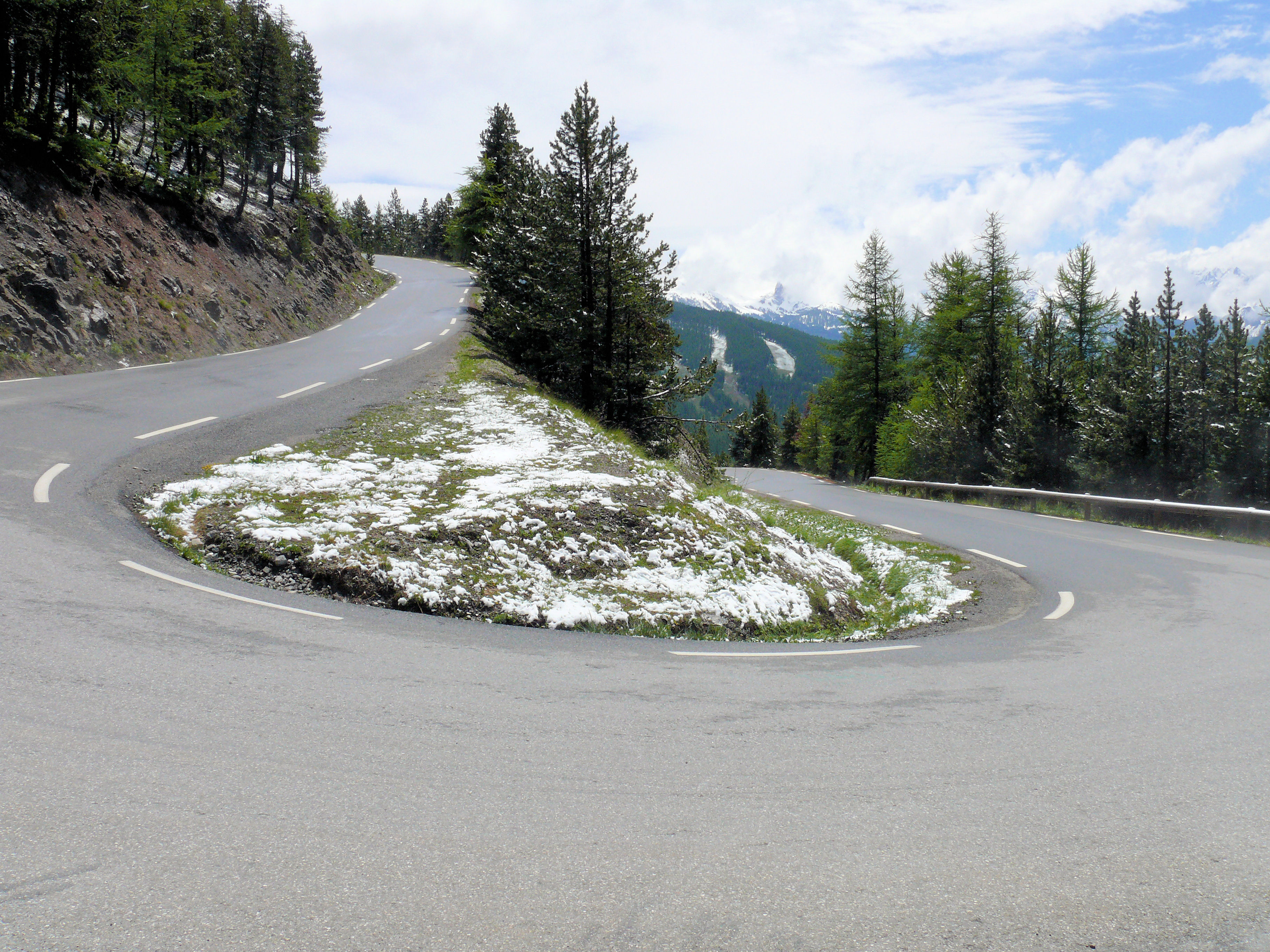
The Col d'Izoard route

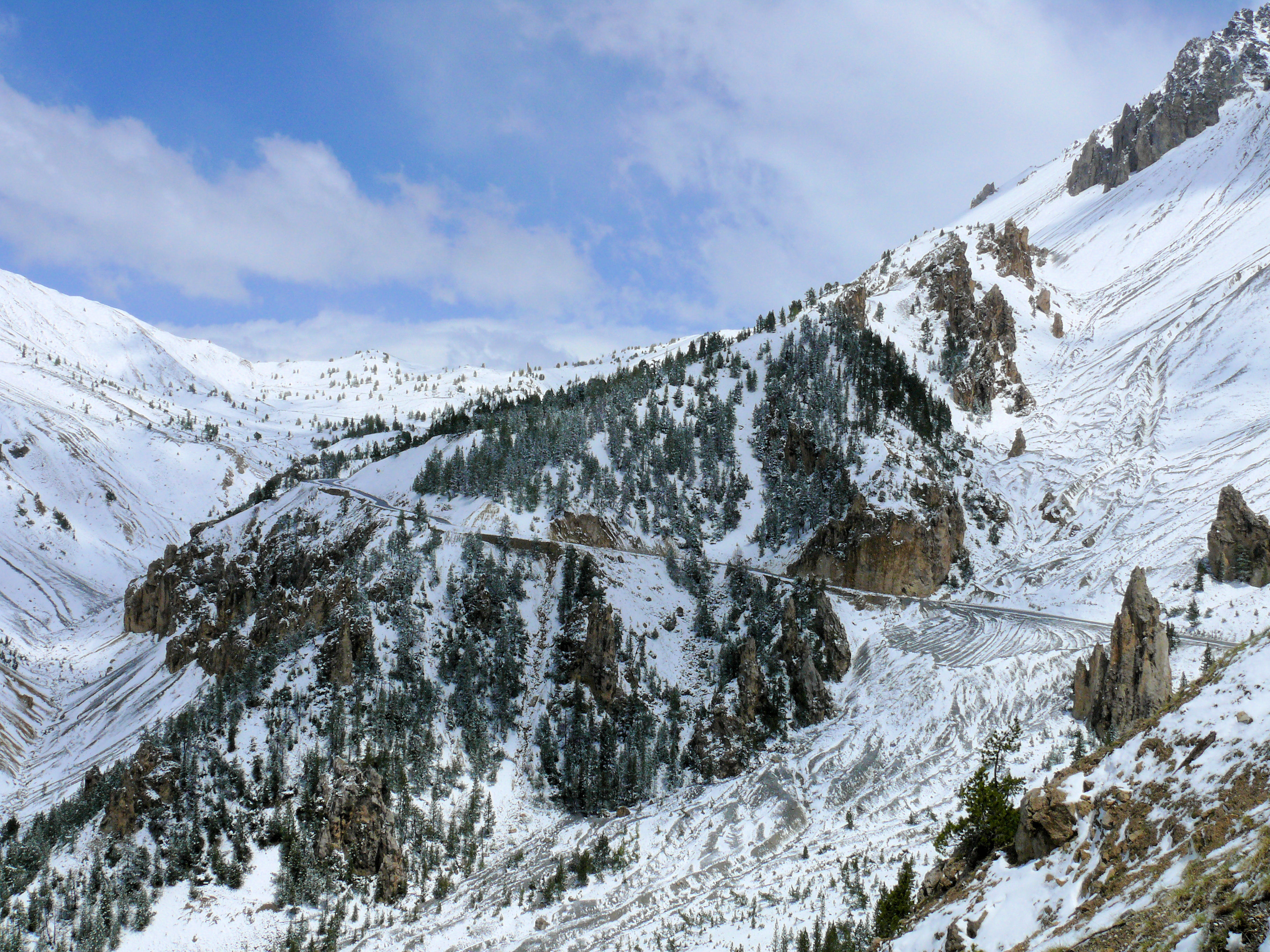
The Col d'Izoard route

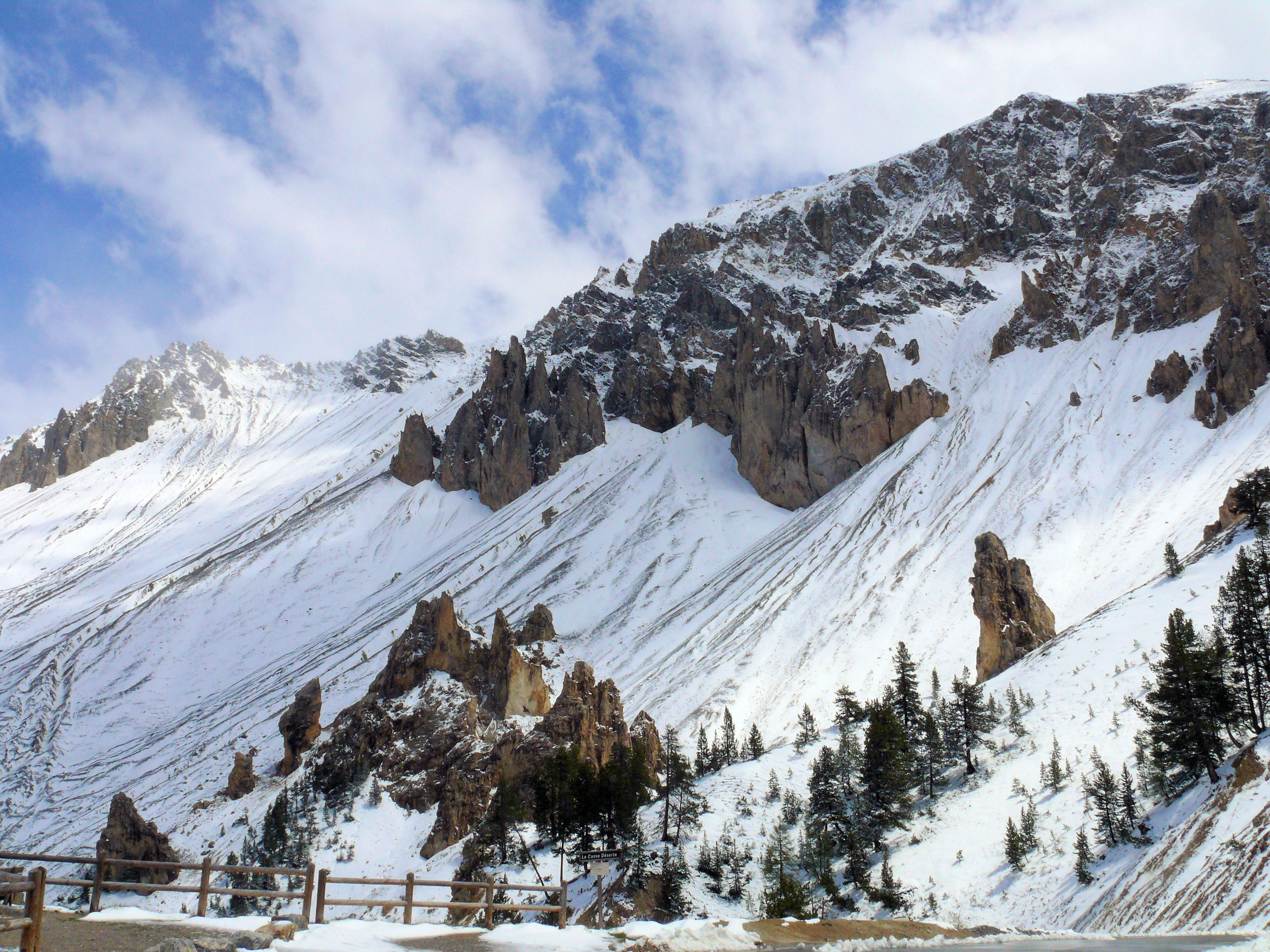
The Col d'Izoard in winter

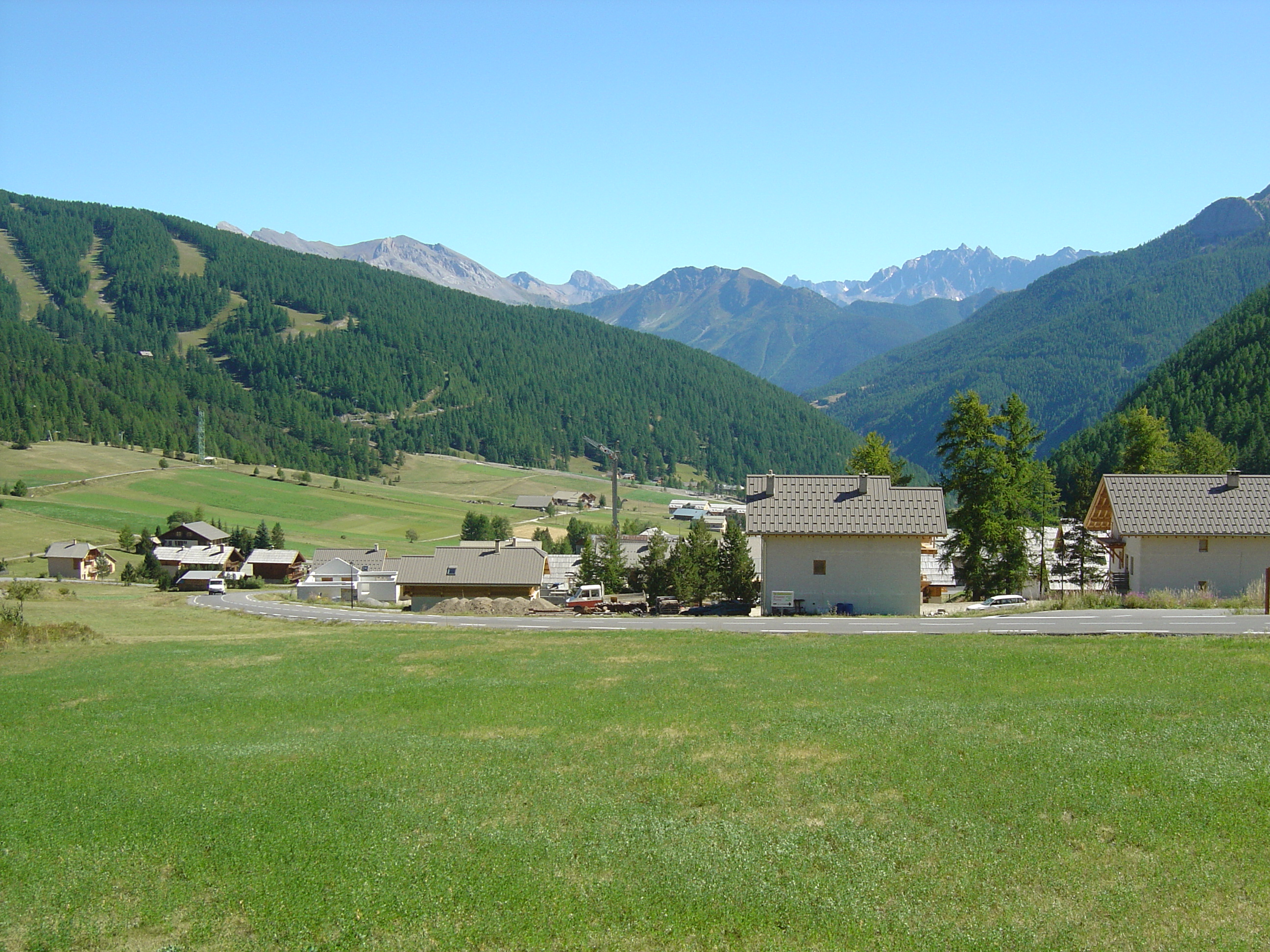
Brunissard

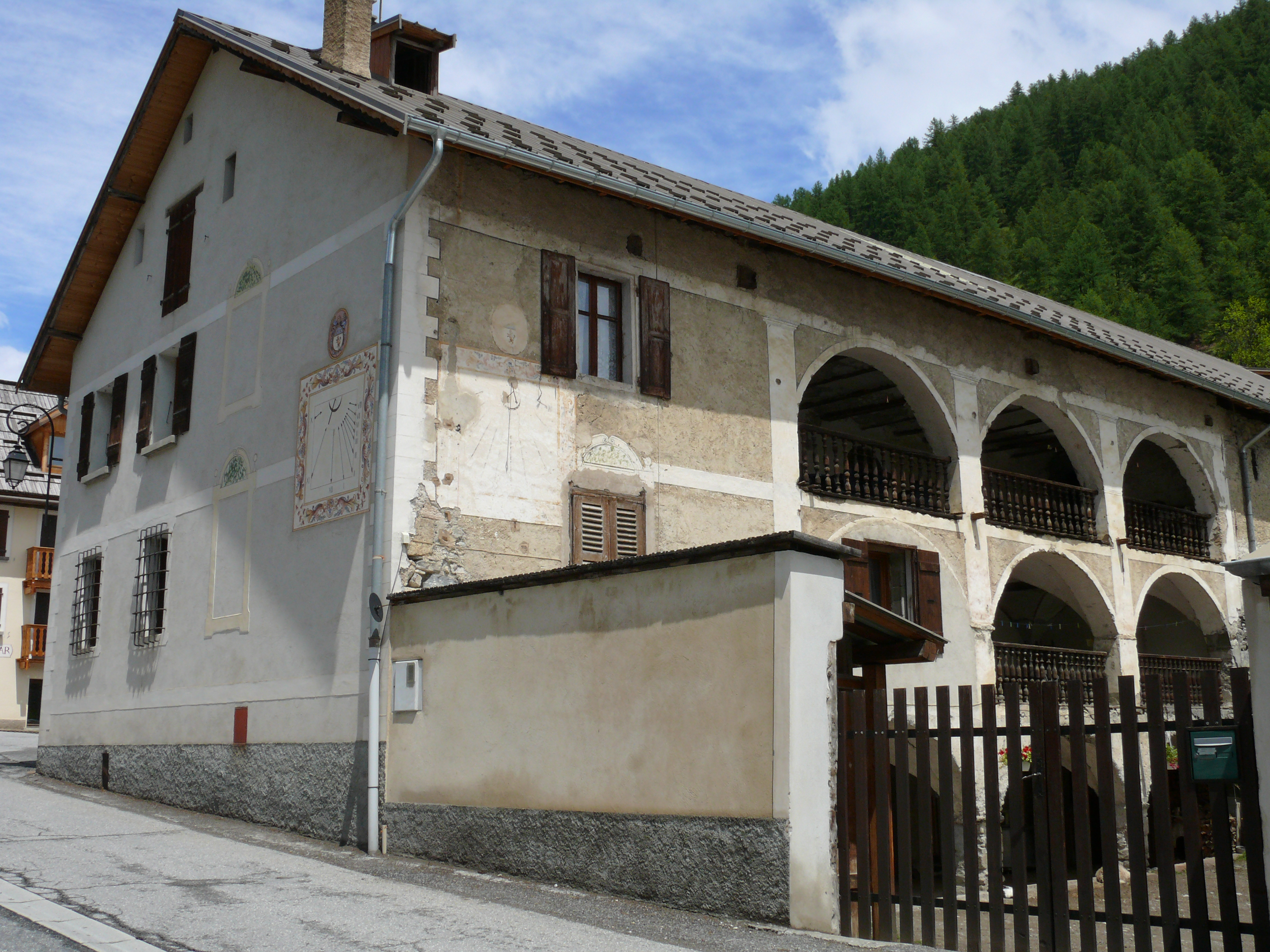
A Farmhouse in the town

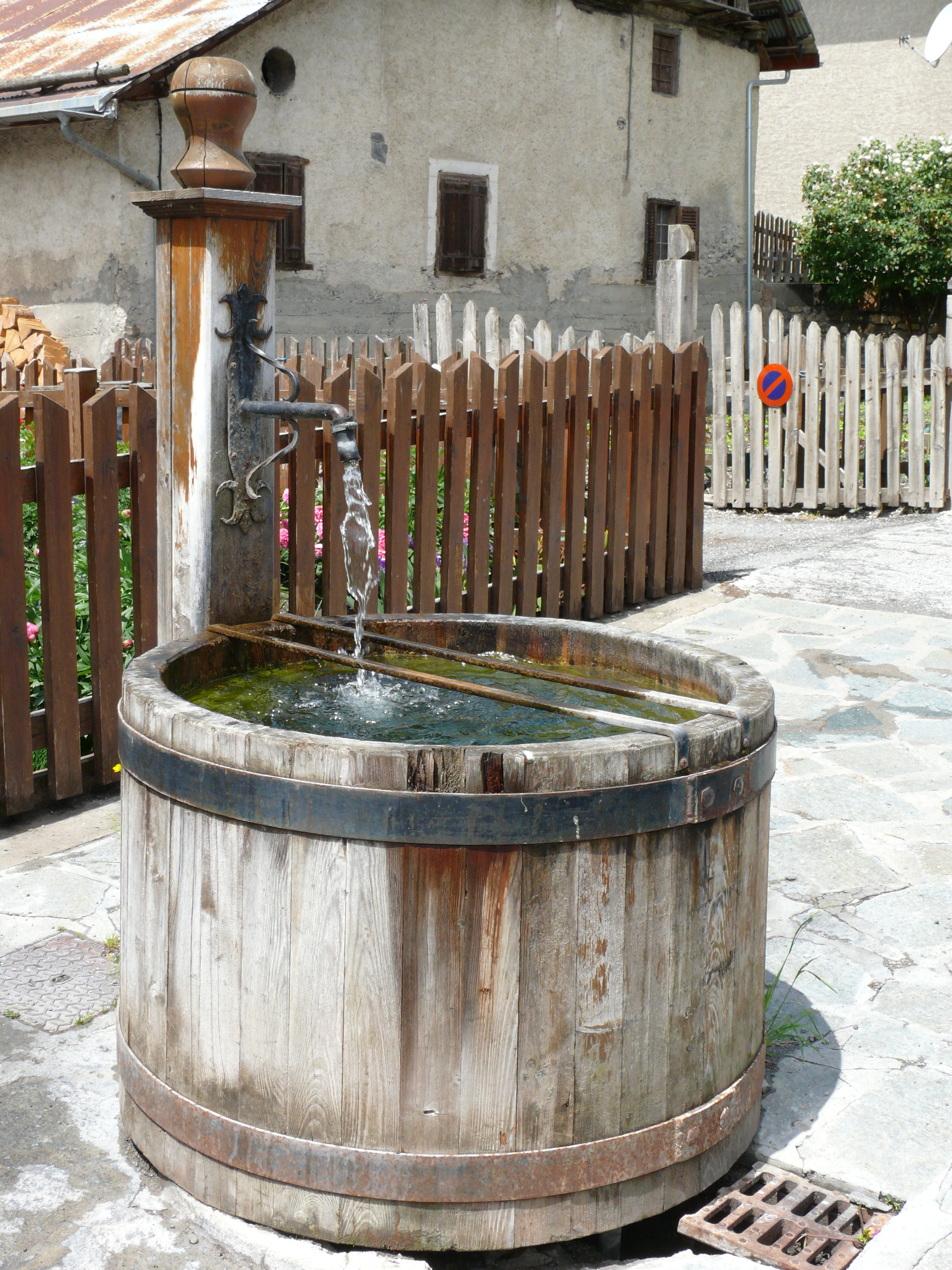
A fountain in the town

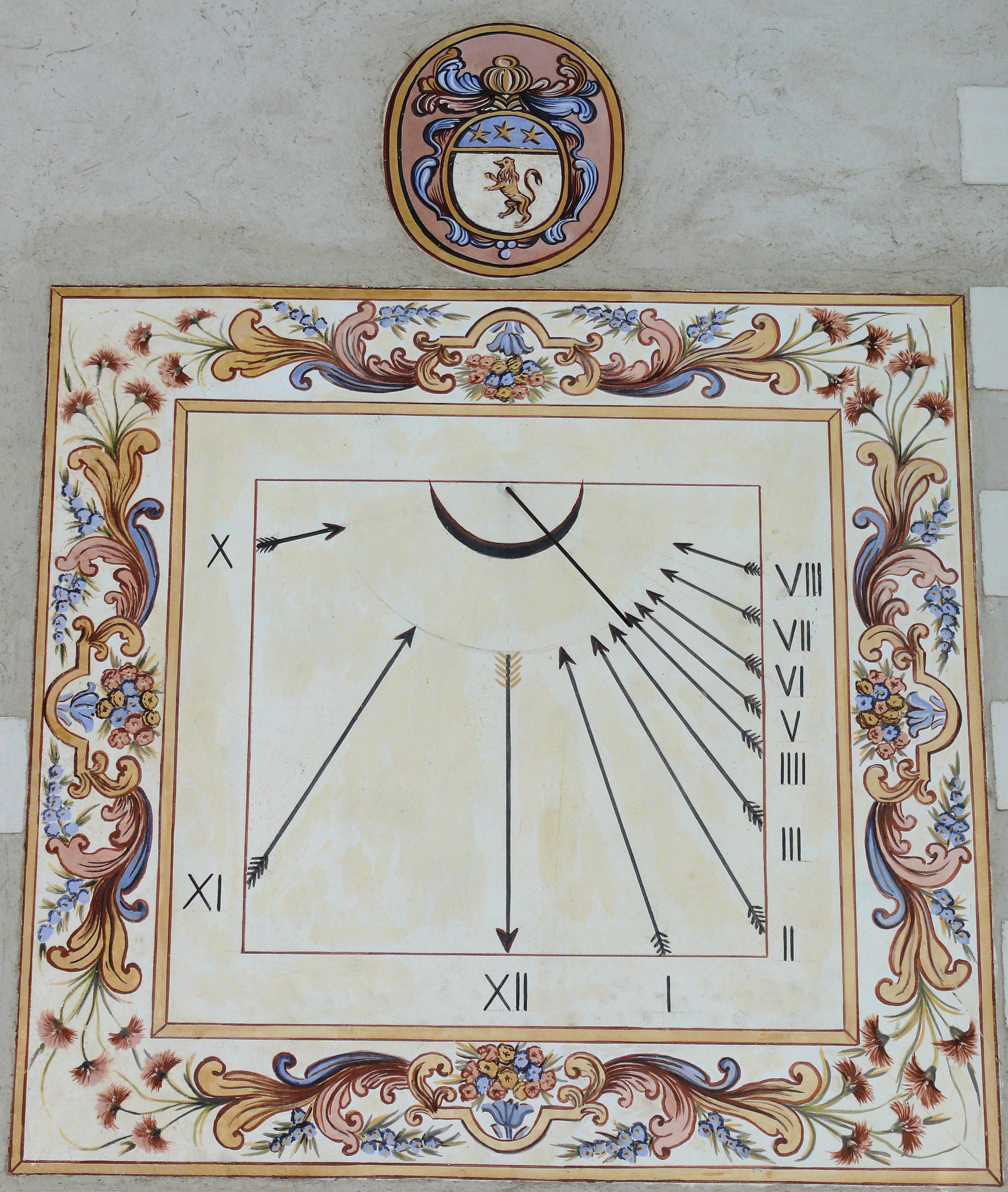
The Queyras sundial

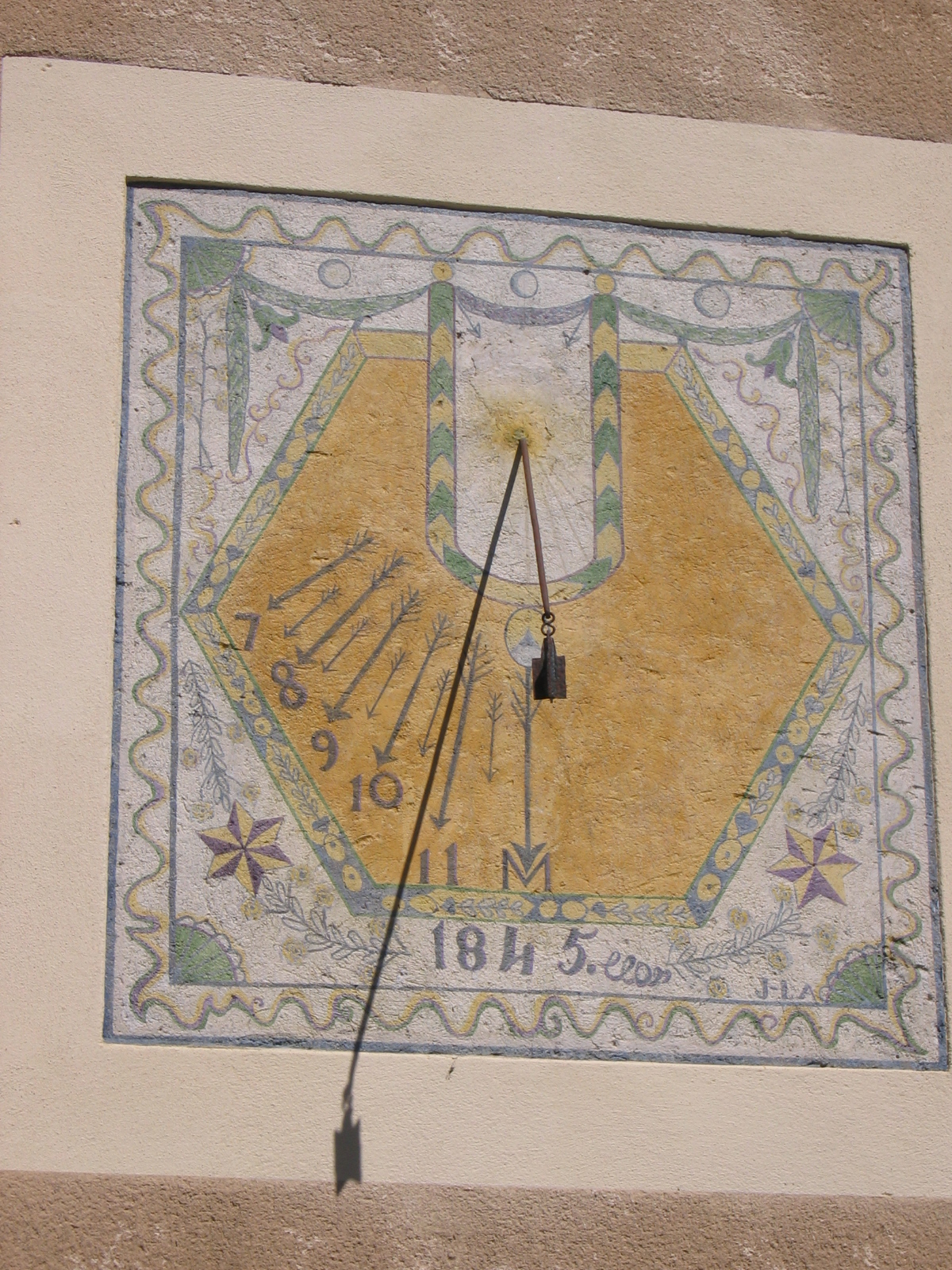
A sundial at Arvieux

=== Religious heritage ===
The commune has many religious buildings and structures that are registered as historical monuments:

- The Benedictine Chapel of Sainte-Marie-Madeleine (1700) The church contains several items that are registered as historical objects:
  - 2 Lintels (1st century)
  - A Reliquary (1604)
  - 2 Statues: Angels (17th century)
  - The Furniture in the Chapel (17th century)
- The Church (16th century)
- The Chapel of Saint-Jacques le Majeur at Villargaudin (18th century). The church contains several items that are registered as historical objects:
  - 2 Hanging Cabinets (19th century)
  - A Painting: Saint Jacques le Majeur (1733)
  - A Retable (18th century)
  - An Altar (19th century)
  - The Furniture in the Chapel
- The Parish Church of Saint-Claude at Le Veyer (15th century) The church contains many items that are registered as historical objects:
  - A Painting: Annunciation (19th century)
  - A Painting with frame: Apparition of the Virgin and child to Saint Antoine (17th century)
  - A Painting: Apparition of the Virgin and child to Saint Antoine (19th century)
  - A Painting: Saint Claude de Besançon (17th century)
  - 2 Busts-Reliquaries: Saints (18th century)
  - A Celebrant's Chair (1675)
  - A Sacristy Cabinet (1) (19th century)
  - A Sacristy Cabinet (2) (19th century)
  - An Altar Pulpit (1828)
  - A Stoup (1865)
  - The Furniture in the Church
- The Chapel of Saint-Romuald near Serre (1785)
- The Chapel of Saint-Roche at Les Escoyeres (1720) The church contains a large number of items that are registered as historical objects.
- The Chapel of Saint-Marcellin at Le Chatelard (1793). The chapel contains several items that are registered as historical objects:
  - A Host Box (1727)
  - A Statuette: Virgin and child (18th century)
  - A Statuette: Immaculate Conception (19th century)
  - A Painting with frame: Saint Pape Martyr (18th century)
  - A Painting with frame: Saint Pape Martyr (18th century)
  - 2 rows of seats (18th century)
  - A Cabinet (18th century)
  - The Furniture in the Chapel
- The Chapel Evangelique at Brunissard (19th century). The chapel contains one item that is registered as an historical object:
  - A Pastoral Pulpit (19th century)
- The Chapel of Saint-Pierre at Brunissard (1845) The chapel contains two items that are registered as historical objects:
  - A Painting: Miraculous Rescue (19th century)
  - The Furniture in the Chapel
- The Protestant Church (1887)
- The Parish Church of Saint-Laurent (15th century) The church contains a very large number of items that are registered as historical objects.
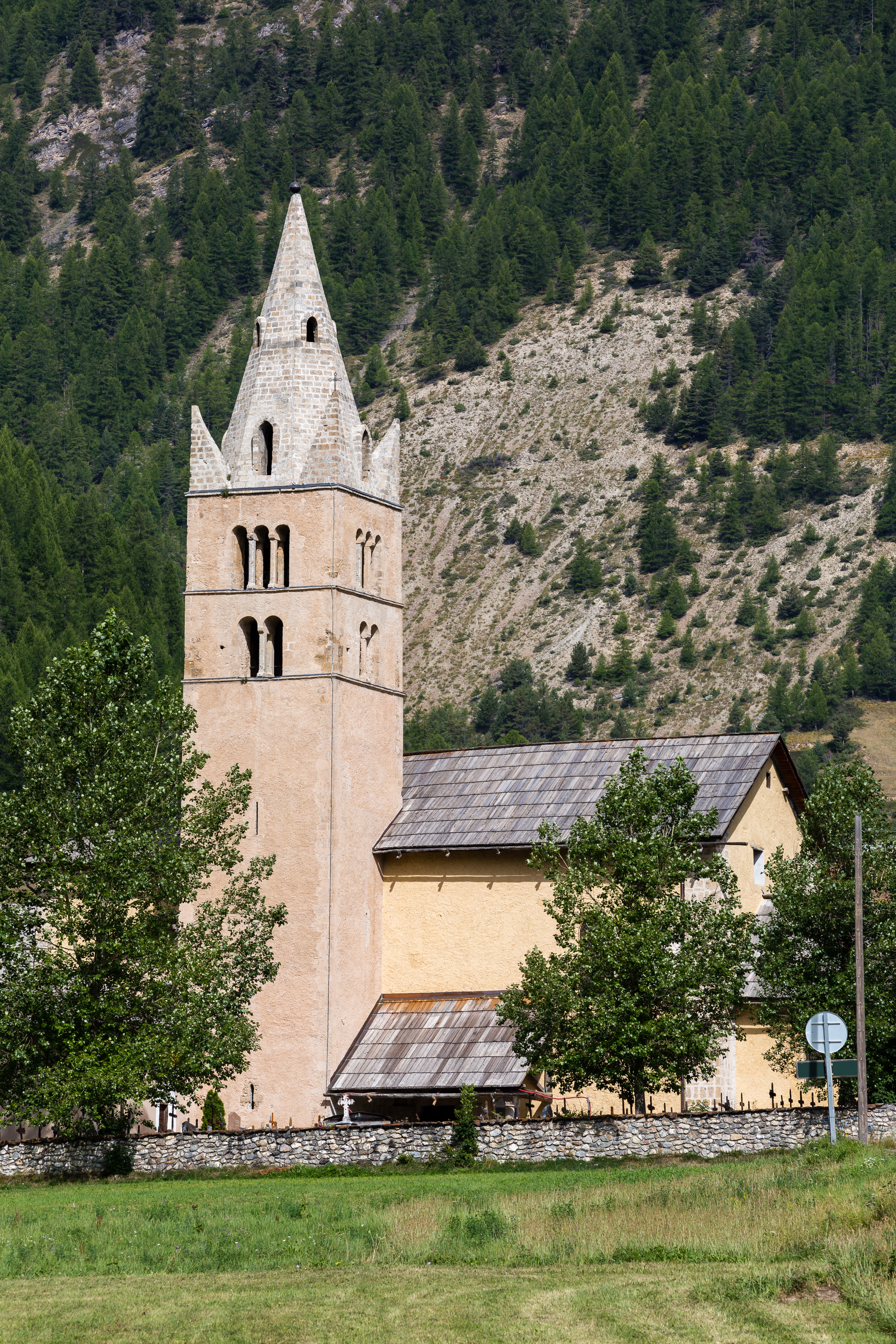
Church of Saint-Laurent.

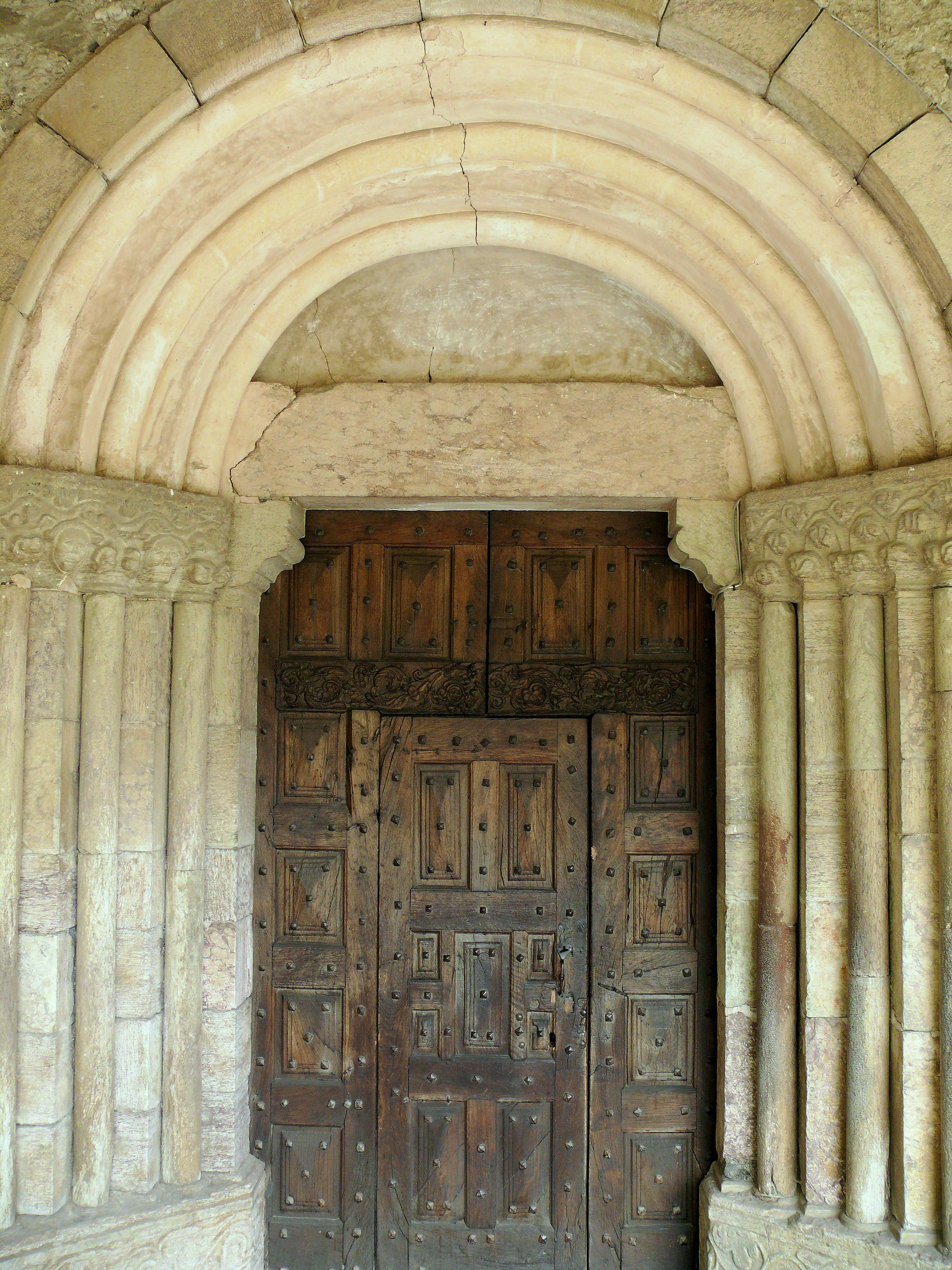
The Church Door

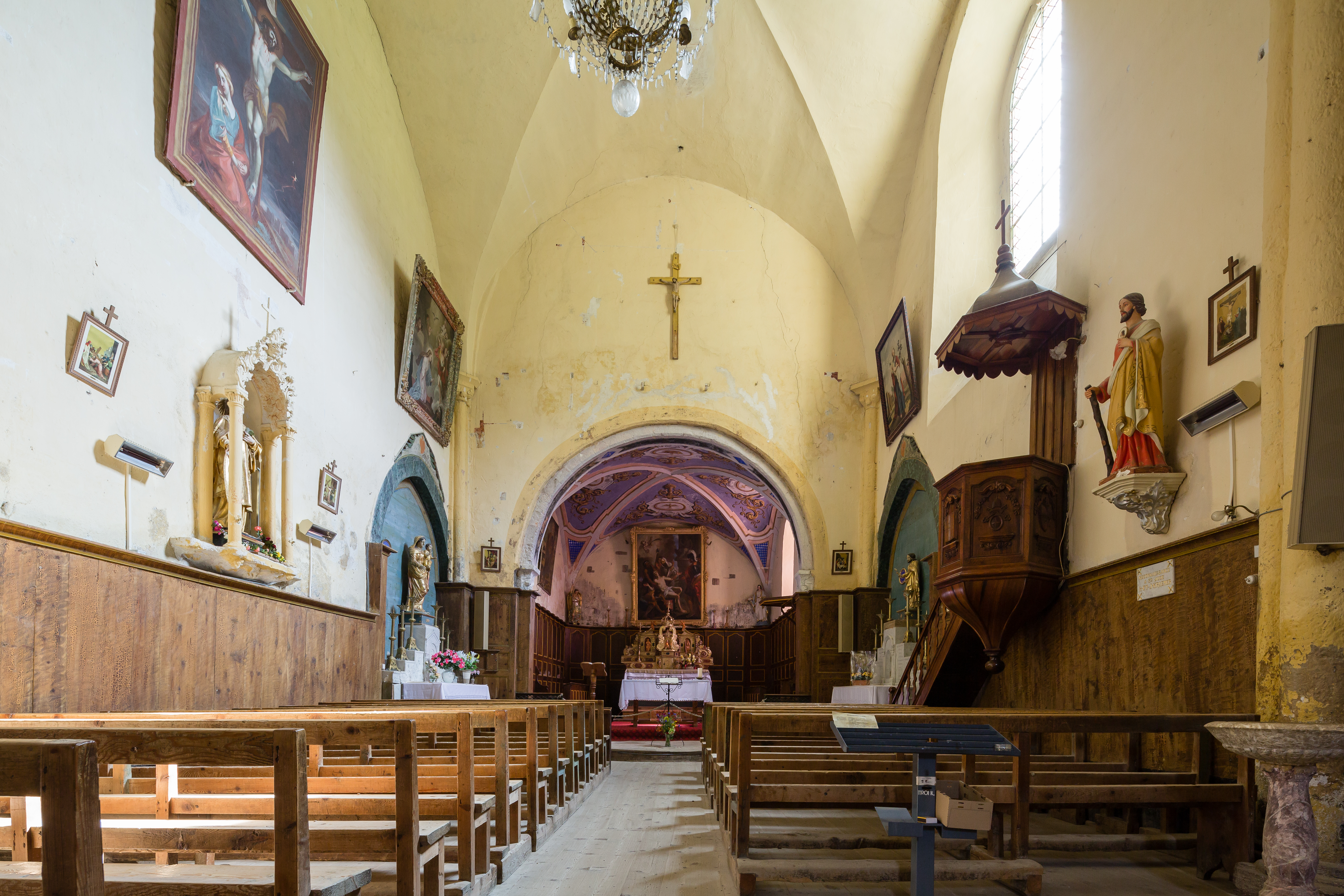
The Nave of the Church.

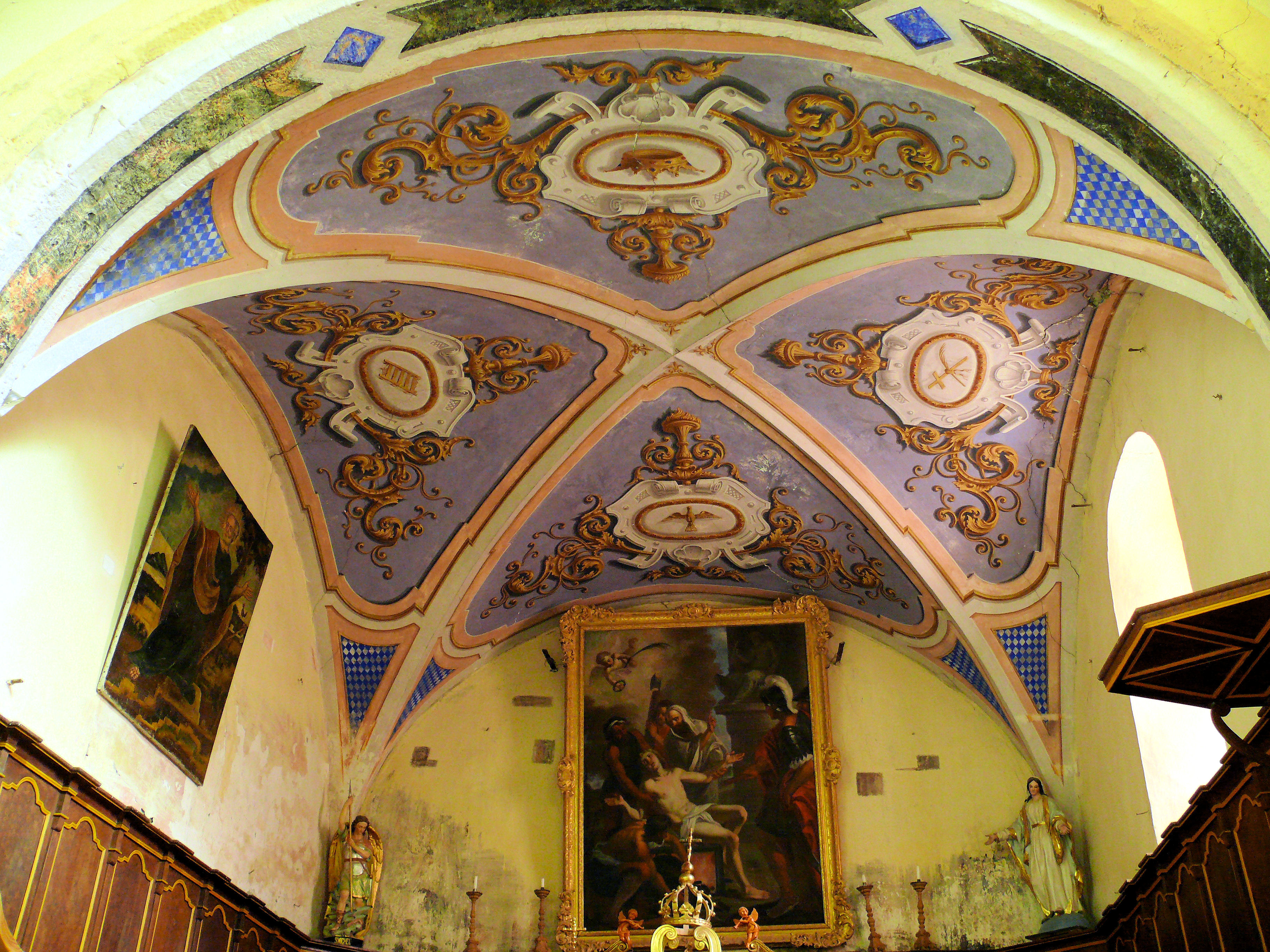
The vault of the choir.

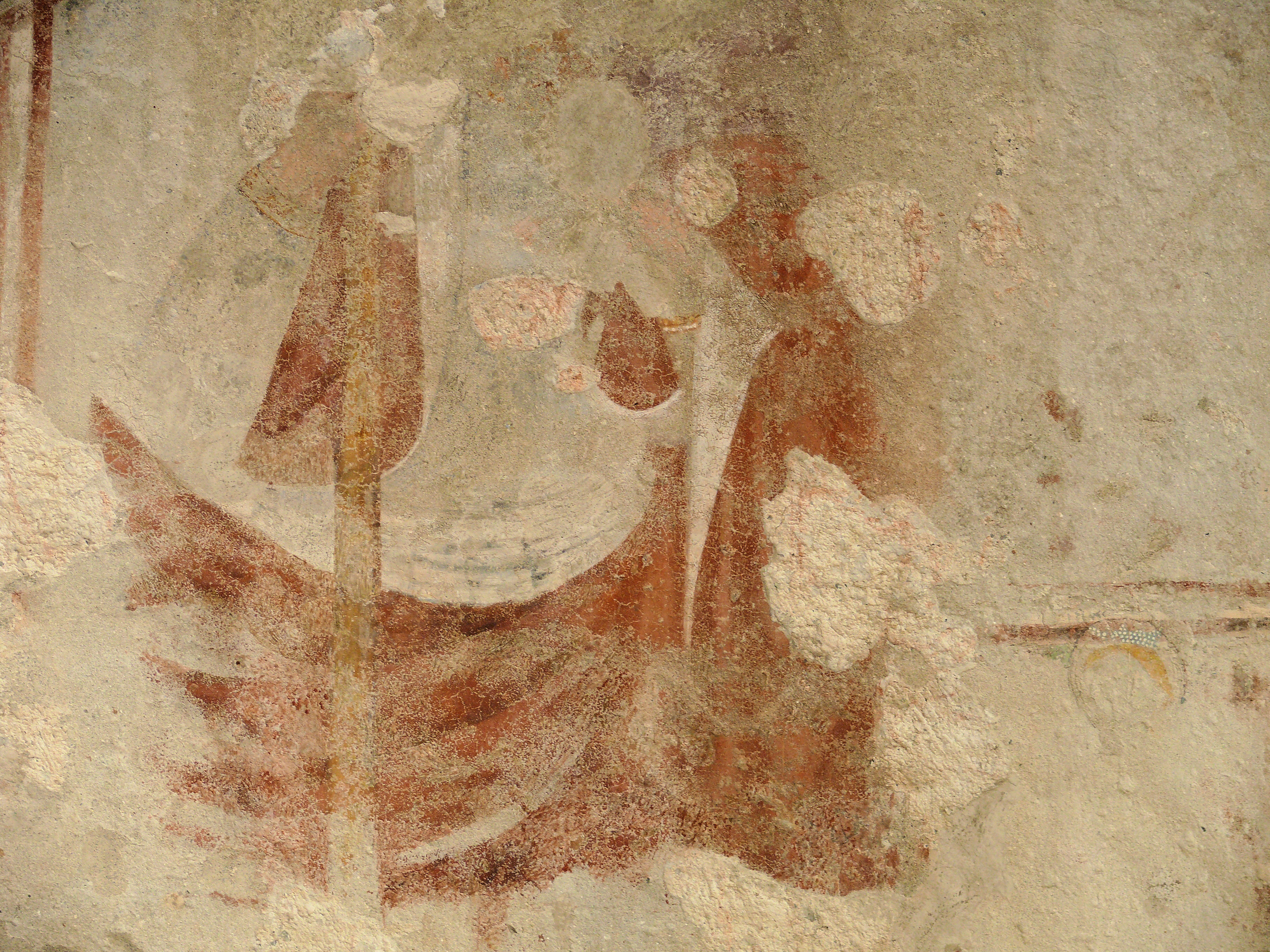
Remains of a mural in the porch

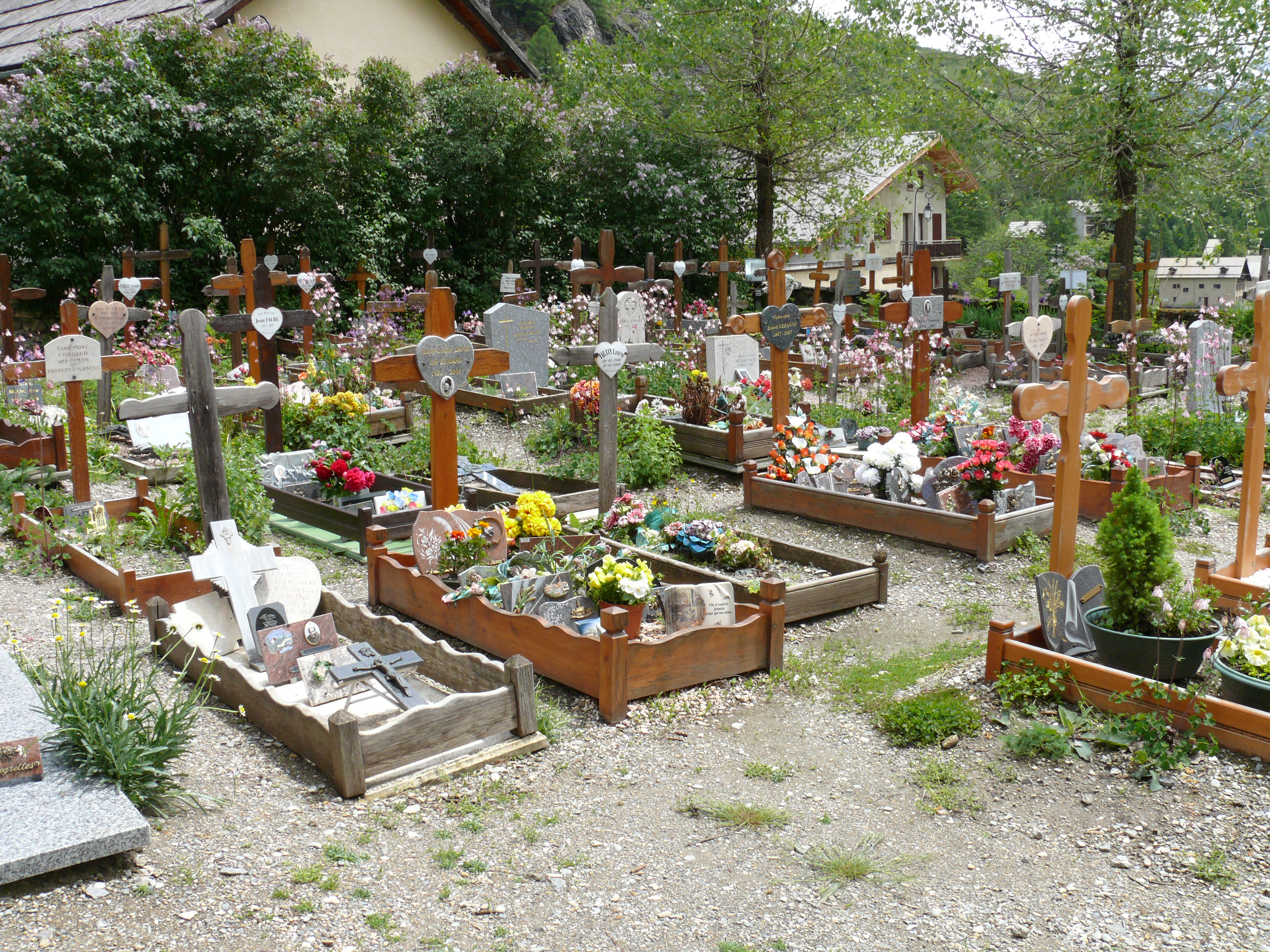
The Cemetery

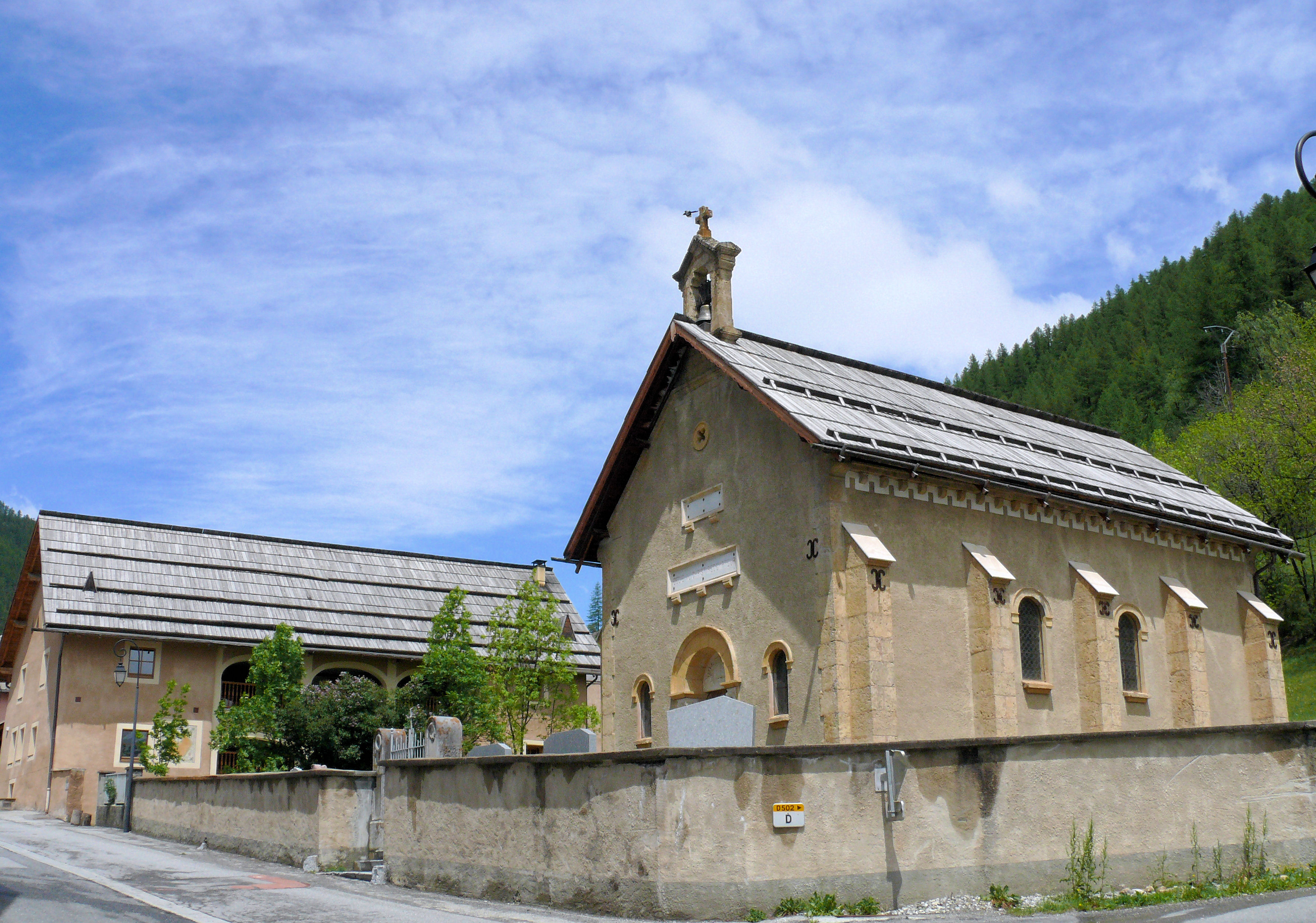
The Arvieux Protestant Church.

== Notable people linked to the commune ==
- Albanus, prefect of the western Alps in the 1st century

== See also ==
- Communes of the Hautes-Alpes department
