= Eygliers =

Eygliers Aigliers (Occitan)
- Commune
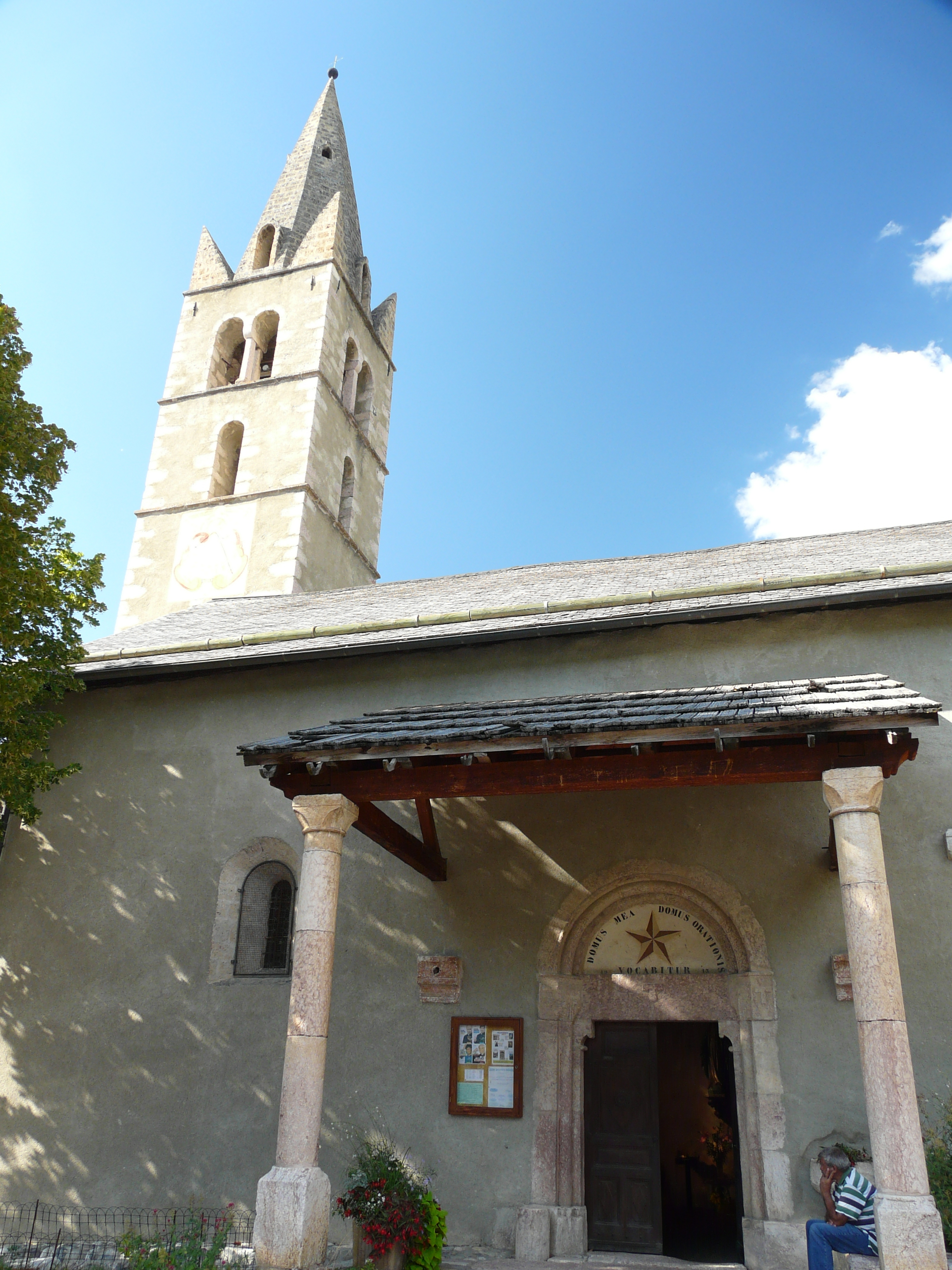
- The church of Saint-Antoine, in Eygliers

- Coat of arms
- Location of Eygliers
- Location within France Location within Provence-Alpes-Côte d'Azur
- Coordinates: 44°40′37″N 6°38′04″E
- Country: France
- Region: Provence-Alpes-Côte d'Azur
- Department: Hautes-Alpes
- Arrondissement: Briançon
- Canton: Guillestre
- Intercommunality: CC du Guillestrois et du Queyras

Government
  - Mayor (2026–32): Aubérie Dimpre
- Area^{1}: 30.04 km^{2} (11.60 sq mi)
- Elevation: 1,029 m (3,376 ft)
- Highest elevation: 2,670 m (8,760 ft)
- Lowest elevation: 881 m (2,890 ft)
- Population (2023): 882
  - Density: 29.4/km^{2} (76.0/sq mi)
- Time zone: UTC+01:00 (CET)
  - Summer (DST): UTC+02:00 (CEST)
- INSEE/Postal code: 05052 /05600
- ^{1} French Land Register data, which excludes lakes, ponds, glaciers > 1 km^{2} (0.386 sq mi or 247 acres) and river estuaries.

Eygliers (French pronunciation: [ɛɡlije]; Occitan: Aigliers) is a commune in the Hautes-Alpes department in the Provence-Alpes-Côte d'Azur region in Southeastern France.

== Geography ==
The river Guil forms all of the commune's southeastern and southern borders; the Durance forms part of its western border; most of the human settlements in the commune are located in its southwestern part, near the confluence of the two rivers. The commune lies to the northwest of the larger town Guillestre, and encloses the fortress town Mont-Dauphin.

== Population ==
Historical population
Year	Pop.	±% p.a.
1968	414	—
1975	403	−0.38%
1982	502	+3.19%
1990	596	+2.17%
1999	697	+1.75%
2007	744	+0.82%
2012	750	+0.16%
2017	791	+1.07%
2023	882	+1.83%
Source: INSEE

== See also ==
- Communes of the Hautes-Alpes department
