= Arrondissement of Briançon =

Coordinates: 44°54′00″N 6°38′40″E

Briançon
- Arrondissement
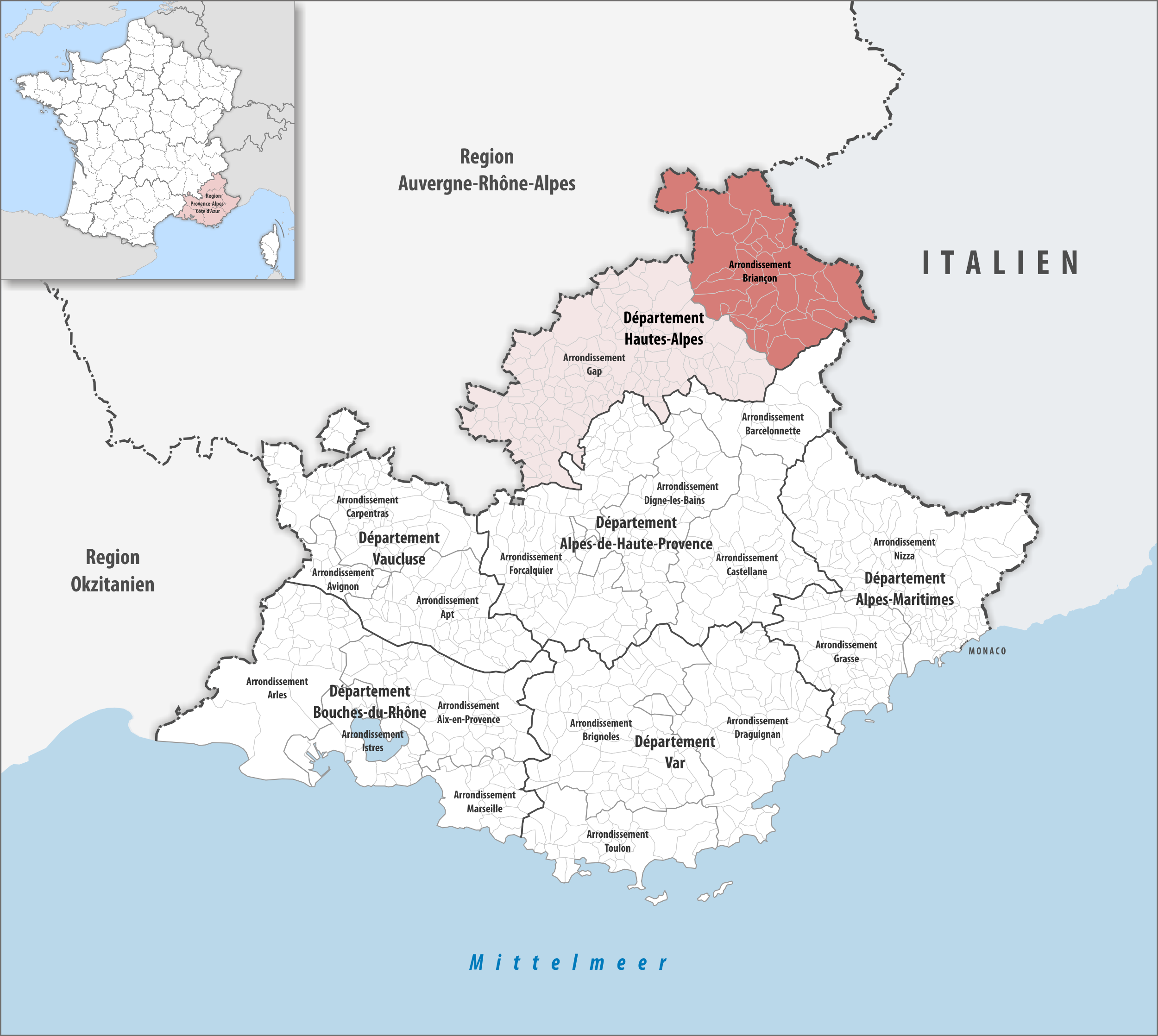
- Location within the region Provence-Alpes-Côte d'Azur
- Country: France
- Region: Provence-Alpes-Côte d'Azur
- Department: Hautes-Alpes
- No. of communes: {{{nbcomm}}}
- Area: 2,138.1 km^{2} (825.5 sq mi)
- Population (2023): 34,129
  - Density: 15.962/km^{2} (41.342/sq mi)
- INSEE code: 051

The arrondissement of Briançon is an arrondissement of France in the Hautes-Alpes department in the Provence-Alpes-Côte d'Azur region. It has 36 communes. Its population is 33,304 (2021), and its area is 2,138.1 km^{2} (825.5 sq mi).

== Composition ==
The communes of the arrondissement of Briançon, and their INSEE codes, are:

1. Abriès-Ristolas (05001)
2. Aiguilles (05003)
3. L'Argentière-la-Bessée (05006)
4. Arvieux (05007)
5. Briançon (05023)
6. Ceillac (05026)
7. Cervières (05027)
8. Champcella (05031)
9. Château-Ville-Vieille (05038)
10. Eygliers (05052)
11. Freissinières (05058)
12. La Grave (05063)
13. Guillestre (05065)
14. Molines-en-Queyras (05077)
15. Le Monêtier-les-Bains (05079)
16. Mont-Dauphin (05082)
17. Montgenèvre (05085)
18. Névache (05093)
19. Puy-Saint-André (05107)
20. Puy-Saint-Pierre (05109)
21. Puy-Saint-Vincent (05110)
22. Réotier (05116)
23. Risoul (05119)
24. La Roche-de-Rame (05122)
25. Saint-Chaffrey (05133)
26. Saint-Clément-sur-Durance (05134)
27. Saint-Crépin (05136)
28. Saint-Martin-de-Queyrières (05151)
29. Saint-Véran (05157)
30. La Salle-les-Alpes (05161)
31. Val-des-Prés (05174)
32. Vallouise-Pelvoux (05101)
33. Vars (05177)
34. Les Vigneaux (05180)
35. Villar-d'Arêne (05181)
36. Villar-Saint-Pancrace (05183)

== History ==
The arrondissement of Briançon was created in 1800.

As a result of the reorganisation of the cantons of France which came into effect in 2015, the borders of the cantons are no longer related to the borders of the arrondissements. The cantons of the arrondissement of Briançon were, as of January 2015:

1. Aiguilles
2. L'Argentière-la-Bessée
3. Briançon-Nord
4. Briançon-Sud
5. La Grave
6. Guillestre
7. Le Monêtier-les-Bains
