= Lac Miroir =

Lac Miroir, Lac des Prés Soubeyran
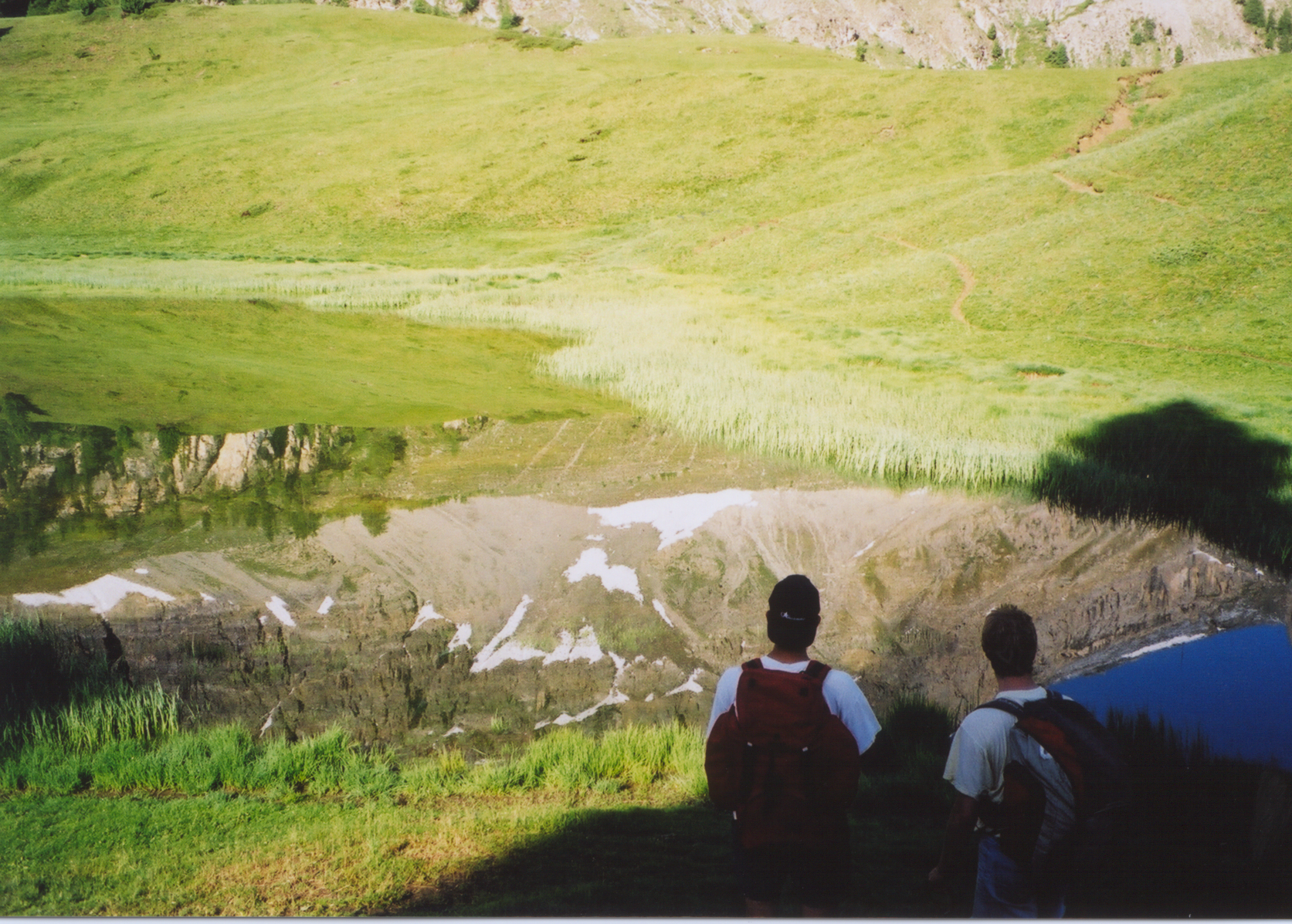

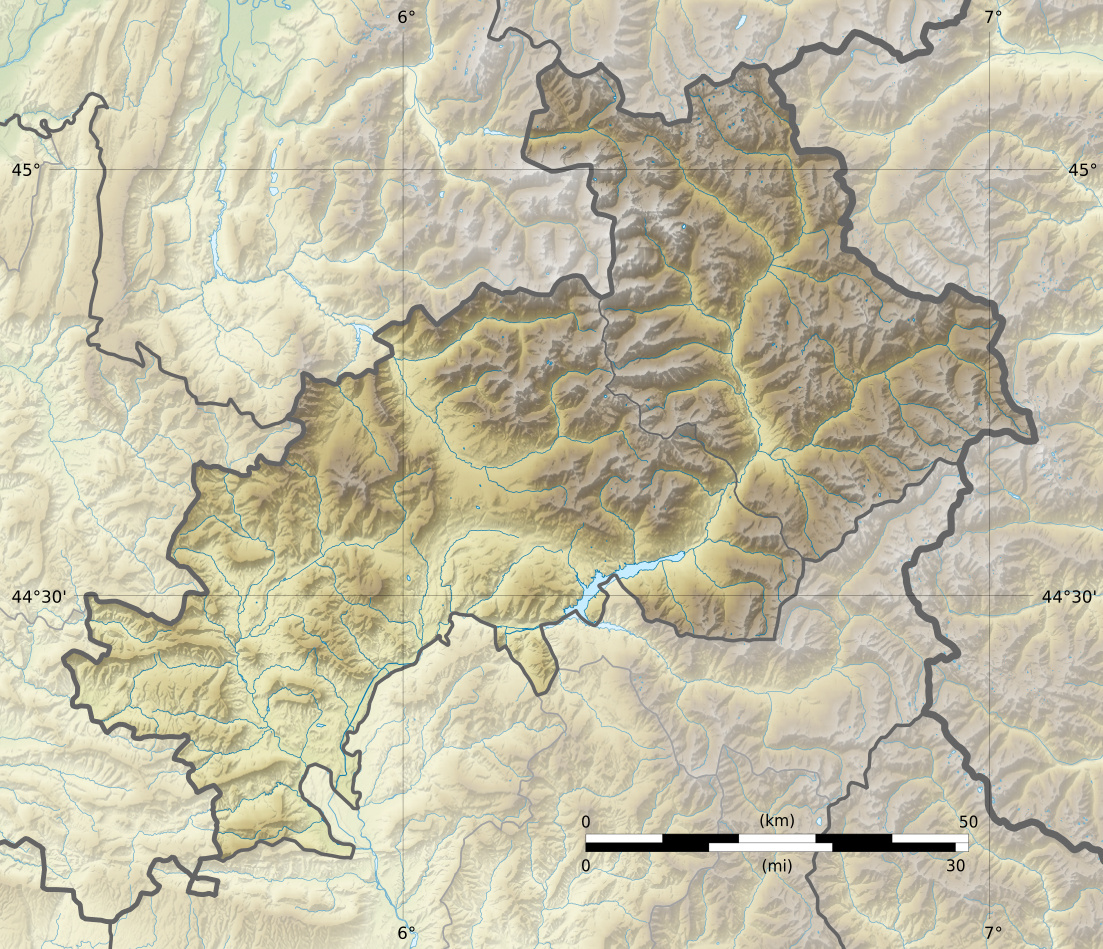
- Location within Hautes-Alpes
- Location: Ceillac, Hautes-Alpes
- Coordinates: 44°38′3″N 6°47′31″E
- Type: Natural freshwater lake
- Basin countries: France
- Max. length: 125 m (410 ft)
- Max. width: 60 m (200 ft)
- Surface elevation: 2,215 m (7,267 ft)

Lac Miroir is a lake in Hautes-Alpes, France.
