= Abriès =

Commune in Haute-Alpes department, France

- Part of Abriès-Ristolas
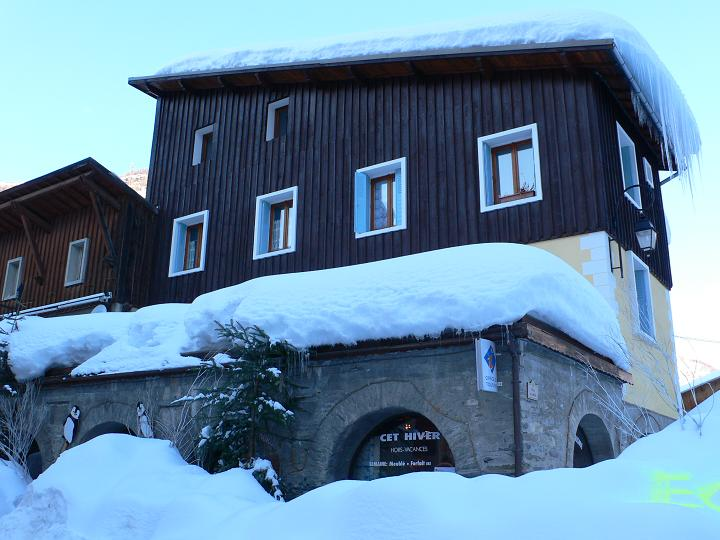
- Town hall
- Location of Abriès
- Location within France Location within Provence-Alpes-Côte d'Azur
- Coordinates: 44°47′46″N 6°55′40″E
- Country: France
- Region: Provence-Alpes-Côte d'Azur
- Department: Hautes-Alpes
- Arrondissement: Briançon
- Canton: Guillestre
- Commune: Abriès-Ristolas
- Area^{1}: 77 km^{2} (30 sq mi)
- Elevation: 1,547 m (5,075 ft)
- Highest elevation: 3,305 m (10,843 ft)
- Lowest elevation: 1,513 m (4,964 ft)
- Population (2021): 285
  - Density: 3.7/km^{2} (9.6/sq mi)
- Time zone: UTC+01:00 (CET)
  - Summer (DST): UTC+02:00 (CEST)
- Postal code: 05460
- ^{1} French Land Register data, which excludes lakes, ponds, glaciers > 1 km^{2} (0.386 sq mi or 247 acres) and river estuaries.

Abriès (Vivaro-Alpine: Abrièrs) is a former commune in the Hautes-Alpes department in southeastern France. On 1 January 2019, it was merged into the new commune of Abriès-Ristolas.

It belongs to the Queyras Regional Park. It is located in the valley of the Guil and is appreciated for its position along long and medium distance footpaths in a rural and preserved environment. It also hosts a small ski resort.

== Geography ==
The elevation of Abriès is between 1,513 and 3,305 meters, and before the second half of the 20th century, it was difficult to access because of its location in the end of the Guil valley. It has always has been a path between Italy and the southern Alps in France.

== Population ==
Historical population

Year	Pop.	±% p.a.
1793	1,511	—
1800	1,935	+3.60%
1806	2,078	+1.20%
1821	1,803	−0.94%
1831	1,838	+0.19%
1836	1,829	−0.10%
1841	1,626	−2.33%
1846	1,726	+1.20%
1851	1,512	−2.61%
1856	1,528	+0.21%
1861	1,346	−2.50%
1866	1,202	−2.24%
1872	1,204	+0.03%
1876	1,125	−1.68%
1881	910	−4.15%
1886	841	−1.56%
1891	748	−2.32%
1896	696	−1.43%

Year	Pop.	±% p.a.
1901	654	−1.24%
1906	668	+0.42%
1911	627	−1.26%
1921	511	−2.02%
1926	406	−4.50%
1931	414	+0.39%
1936	370	−2.22%
1946	275	−2.92%
1954	264	−0.51%
1962	205	−3.11%
1968	195	−0.83%
1975	207	+0.86%
1982	271	+3.92%
1990	297	+1.15%
1999	354	+1.97%
2006	382	+1.09%
2011	343	−2.13%
2016	302	−2.51%

Source: EHESS (1793-1999) and INSEE

== See also ==
- Communes of the Hautes-Alpes department

== See also ==
- Bric Froid
