= Saint-Clément-sur-Durance =

Saint-Clément-sur-Durance Sant Clamenç sus Durença (Occitan)
- Commune
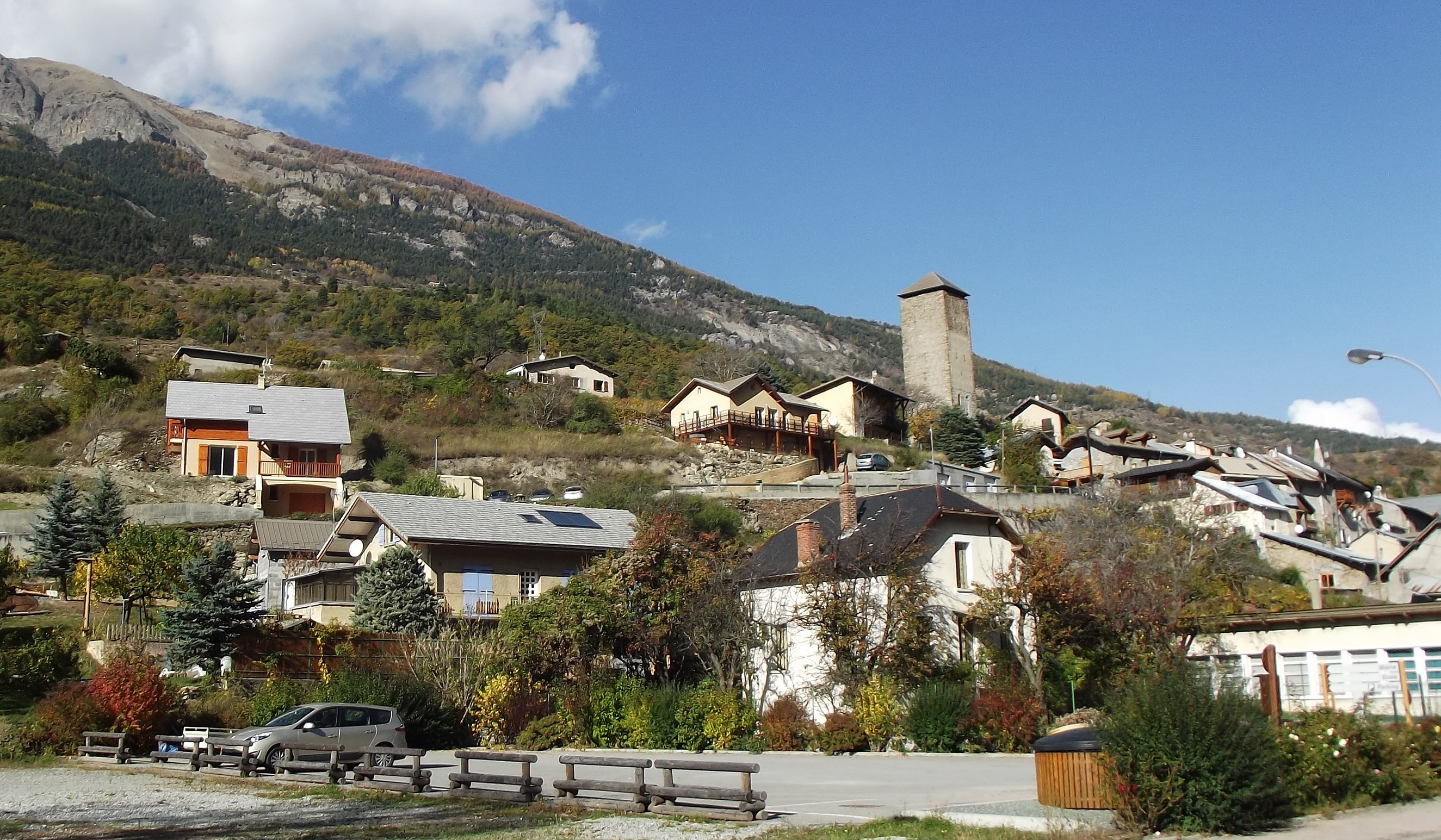
- The village of Saint-Clément-sur-Durance

- Coat of arms
- Location of Saint-Clément-sur-Durance
- Location within France Location within Provence-Alpes-Côte d'Azur
- Coordinates: 44°38′59″N 6°34′45″E
- Country: France
- Region: Provence-Alpes-Côte d'Azur
- Department: Hautes-Alpes
- Arrondissement: Briançon
- Canton: Guillestre
- Intercommunality: CC du Guillestrois et du Queyras

Government
  - Mayor (2026–32): Jean-Louis Berard
- Area^{1}: 25.06 km^{2} (9.68 sq mi)
- Elevation: 872 m (2,861 ft)
- Highest elevation: 2,836 m (9,304 ft)
- Lowest elevation: 858 m (2,815 ft)
- Population (2023): 343
  - Density: 13.7/km^{2} (35.4/sq mi)
- Time zone: UTC+01:00 (CET)
  - Summer (DST): UTC+02:00 (CEST)
- INSEE/Postal code: 05134 /05600
- ^{1} French Land Register data, which excludes lakes, ponds, glaciers > 1 km^{2} (0.386 sq mi or 247 acres) and river estuaries.

Saint-Clément-sur-Durance (French pronunciation: [sɛ̃ klemɑ̃ syʁ dyʁɑ̃s]; lit. 'St Clement-on-Durance'; Vivaro-Alpine Occitan: Sant Clamenç sus Durença, before 1989: Saint-Clément) is an alpine commune in the Hautes-Alpes department in southeastern France.

It is northeast of Embrun, on national road 94 (RN 94), from Gap to Montgenèvre on the Italian border.

== Population ==
Historical population
Year	Pop.	±% p.a.
1968	227	—
1975	195	−2.15%
1982	205	+0.72%
1990	191	−0.88%
1999	229	+2.04%
2007	271	+2.13%
2012	295	+1.71%
2017	309	+0.93%
2023	343	+1.76%
Source: INSEE

== See also ==
- Communes of the Hautes-Alpes department
