= Abriès-Ristolas =

- Commune
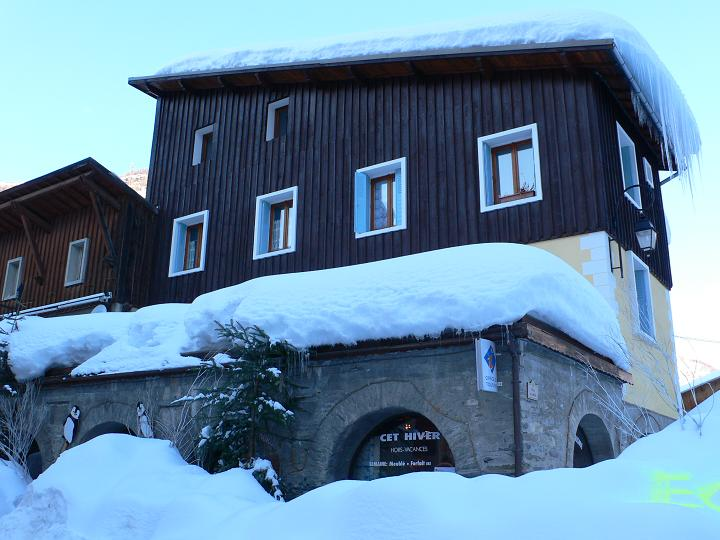
- Town hall
- Location of Abriès-Ristolas
- Location within France Location within Provence-Alpes-Côte d'Azur
- Coordinates: 44°47′46″N 6°55′40″E
- Country: France
- Region: Provence-Alpes-Côte d'Azur
- Department: Hautes-Alpes
- Arrondissement: Briançon
- Canton: Guillestre
- Intercommunality: Guillestrois et Queyras

Government
  - Mayor (2026–32): Charles Lacroix
- Area^{1}: 159.31 km^{2} (61.51 sq mi)
- Elevation: 1,547 m (5,075 ft)
- Highest elevation: 3,305 m (10,843 ft)
- Lowest elevation: 1,513 m (4,964 ft)
- Population (2023): 374
  - Density: 2.35/km^{2} (6.08/sq mi)
- Time zone: UTC+01:00 (CET)
  - Summer (DST): UTC+02:00 (CEST)
- INSEE/Postal code: 05001 /05460
- ^{1} French Land Register data, which excludes lakes, ponds, glaciers > 1 km^{2} (0.386 sq mi or 247 acres) and river estuaries.

Abriès-Ristolas is a commune in the Hautes-Alpes department in southeastern France. The municipality was established on 1 January 2019 by merger of the former communes of Abriès and Ristolas.
