= Saint-Crépin, Hautes-Alpes =

Saint-Crépin
- Commune
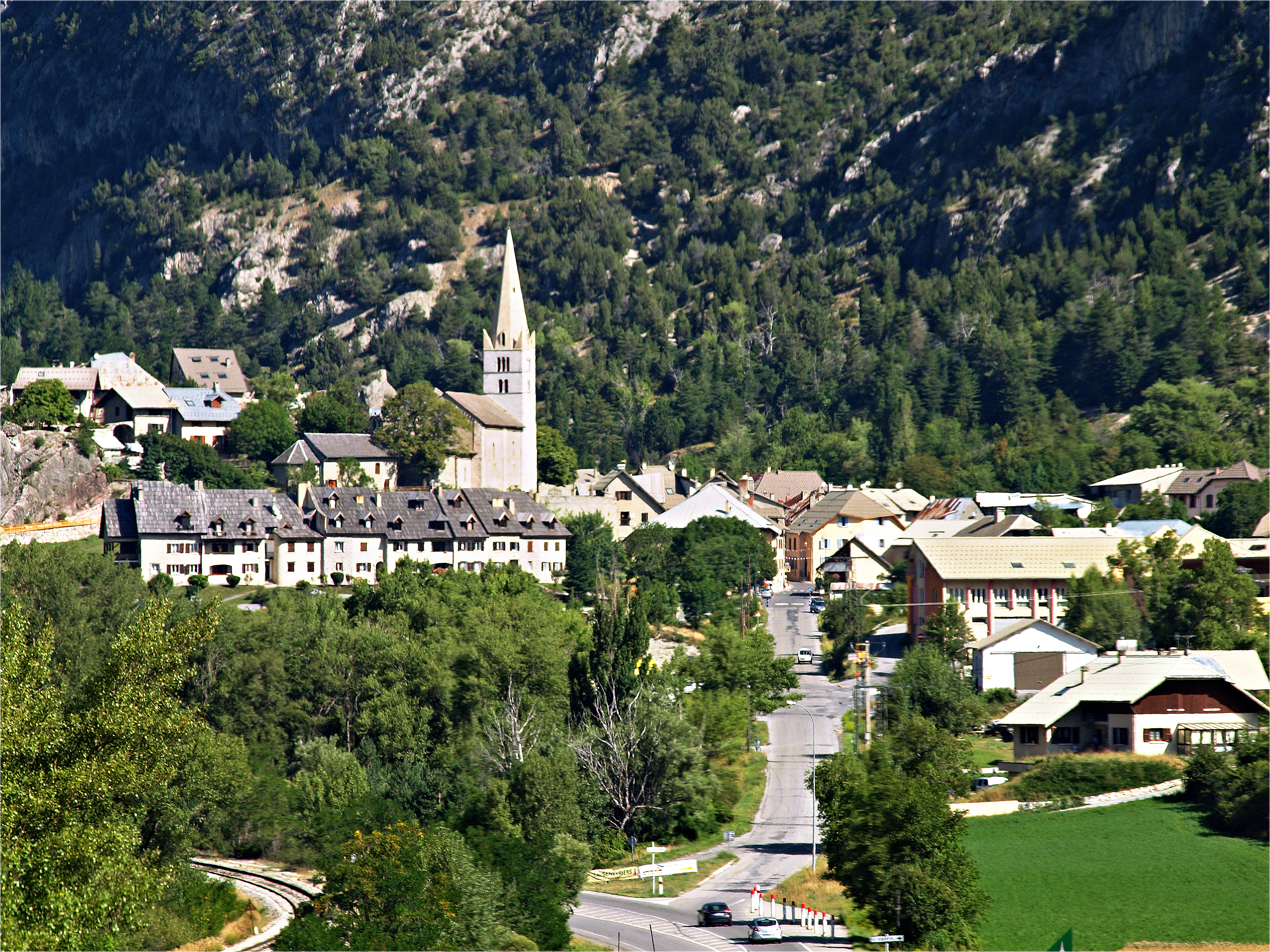
- The village of Saint-Crépin, with the church and surrounding buildings

- Coat of arms
- Location of Saint-Crépin
- Location within France Location within Provence-Alpes-Côte d'Azur
- Coordinates: 44°42′27″N 6°36′29″E
- Country: France
- Region: Provence-Alpes-Côte d'Azur
- Department: Hautes-Alpes
- Arrondissement: Briançon
- Canton: Guillestre

Government
  - Mayor (2026–32): Jean-Louis Queyras
- Area^{1}: 46.3 km^{2} (17.9 sq mi)
- Elevation: 920 m (3,020 ft)
- Highest elevation: 2,905 m (9,531 ft)
- Lowest elevation: 894 m (2,933 ft)
- Population (2023): 718
  - Density: 15.5/km^{2} (40.2/sq mi)
- Time zone: UTC+01:00 (CET)
  - Summer (DST): UTC+02:00 (CEST)
- INSEE/Postal code: 05136 /05600
- ^{1} French Land Register data, which excludes lakes, ponds, glaciers > 1 km^{2} (0.386 sq mi or 247 acres) and river estuaries.

Saint-Crépin (French pronunciation: [sɛ̃ kʁepɛ̃]; Occitan: Sant Crespin) is a commune in the Hautes-Alpes department in southeastern France.

== Population ==
Historical population
Year	Pop.	±% p.a.
1968	400	—
1975	402	+0.07%
1982	507	+3.37%
1990	533	+0.63%
1999	541	+0.17%
2007	592	+1.13%
2012	653	+1.98%
2017	733	+2.34%
2023	718	−0.34%
Source: INSEE

== See also ==
- Communes of the Hautes-Alpes department
