= Mont-Dauphin =

- Commune
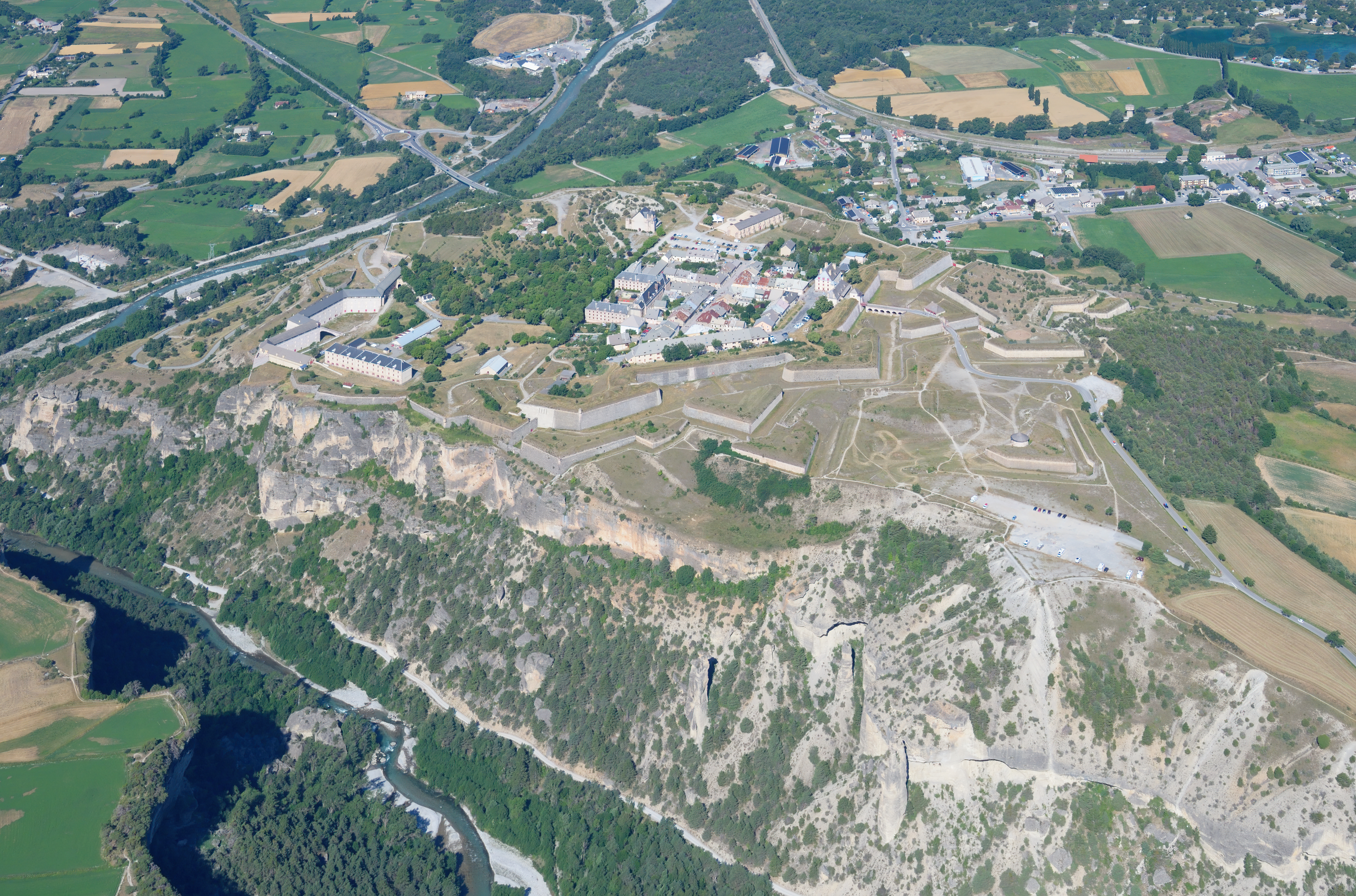
- Fort

- Coat of arms
- Location of Mont-Dauphin
- Location within France Location within Provence-Alpes-Côte d'Azur
- Coordinates: 44°40′12″N 6°37′28″E
- Country: France
- Region: Provence-Alpes-Côte d'Azur
- Department: Hautes-Alpes
- Arrondissement: Briançon
- Canton: Guillestre

Government
  - Mayor (2026–32): Raphaëlle Martoia
- Area^{1}: 0.58 km^{2} (0.22 sq mi)
- Elevation: 1,050 m (3,440 ft)
- Highest elevation: 1,035 m (3,396 ft)
- Lowest elevation: 898 m (2,946 ft)
- Population (2023): 162
  - Density: 280/km^{2} (720/sq mi)
- Time zone: UTC+01:00 (CET)
  - Summer (DST): UTC+02:00 (CEST)
- INSEE/Postal code: 05082 /05600
- ^{1} French Land Register data, which excludes lakes, ponds, glaciers > 1 km^{2} (0.386 sq mi or 247 acres) and river estuaries.

Mont-Dauphin (French pronunciation: [mɔ̃ dofɛ̃]; Occitan: Montdaufin) is a commune in the Hautes-Alpes department in southeastern France.

At the confluence of Durance and Guil rivers, overlooking the impressive canyon of the latter flowing down from Queyras valleys, Mont-Dauphin is one of the many places fortified by Vauban in the second half of the 17th century.

In 2008, the place forte of Mont-Dauphin, was listed as a UNESCO World Heritage Site, as part of the "Fortifications of Vauban" group.

== Population ==
Historical population
Year	Pop.	±% p.a.
1968	59	—
1975	67	+1.83%
1982	83	+3.11%
1990	73	−1.59%
1999	87	+1.97%
2007	136	+5.74%
2012	151	+2.11%
2017	164	+1.67%
2023	162	−0.20%
Source: INSEE

== See also ==
- Communes of the Hautes-Alpes department
