= Réotier =

- Commune
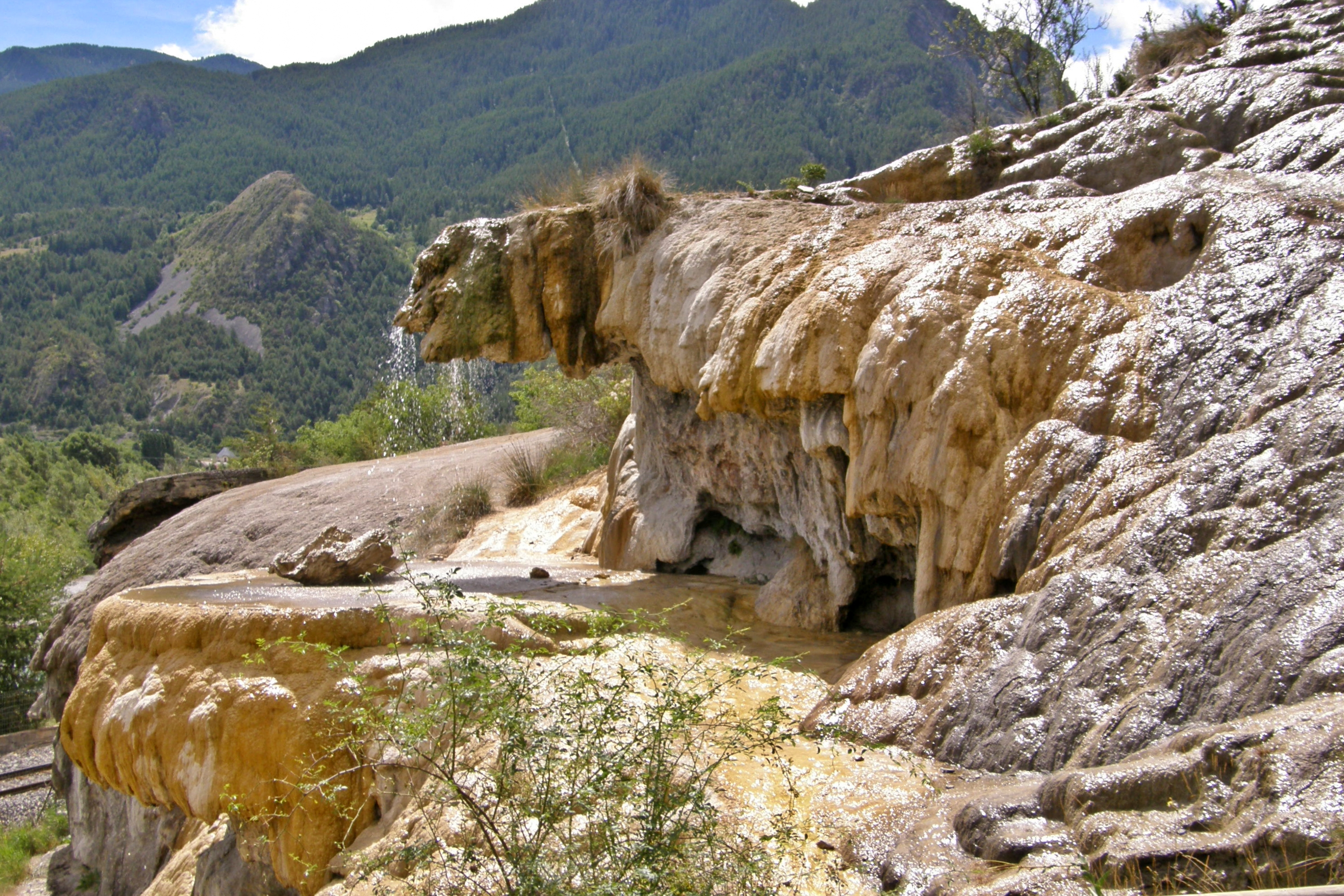
- Petrified fountain

- Coat of arms
- Location of Réotier
- Location within France Location within Provence-Alpes-Côte d'Azur
- Coordinates: 44°39′53″N 6°35′26″E
- Country: France
- Region: Provence-Alpes-Côte d'Azur
- Department: Hautes-Alpes
- Arrondissement: Briançon
- Canton: Guillestre
- Intercommunality: Guillestrois et Queyras

Government
  - Mayor (2026–32): Marcel Cannat
- Area^{1}: 22.33 km^{2} (8.62 sq mi)
- Elevation: 1,050 m (3,440 ft)
- Highest elevation: 3,086 m (10,125 ft)
- Lowest elevation: 871 m (2,858 ft)
- Population (2023): 226
  - Density: 10.1/km^{2} (26.2/sq mi)
- Time zone: UTC+01:00 (CET)
  - Summer (DST): UTC+02:00 (CEST)
- INSEE/Postal code: 05116 /05600
- ^{1} French Land Register data, which excludes lakes, ponds, glaciers > 1 km^{2} (0.386 sq mi or 247 acres) and river estuaries.

Réotier (French pronunciation: [ʁe.ɔtje]; Occitan: Reotier) is a commune in the Hautes-Alpes department in southeastern France.

== Population ==
Historical population
Year	Pop.	±% p.a.
1968	163	—
1975	132	−2.97%
1982	128	−0.44%
1990	136	+0.76%
1999	161	+1.89%
2007	185	+1.75%
2012	207	+2.27%
2017	200	−0.69%
2023	226	+2.06%
Source: INSEE

== See also ==
- Communes of the Hautes-Alpes department
