= Ceillac =

- Commune
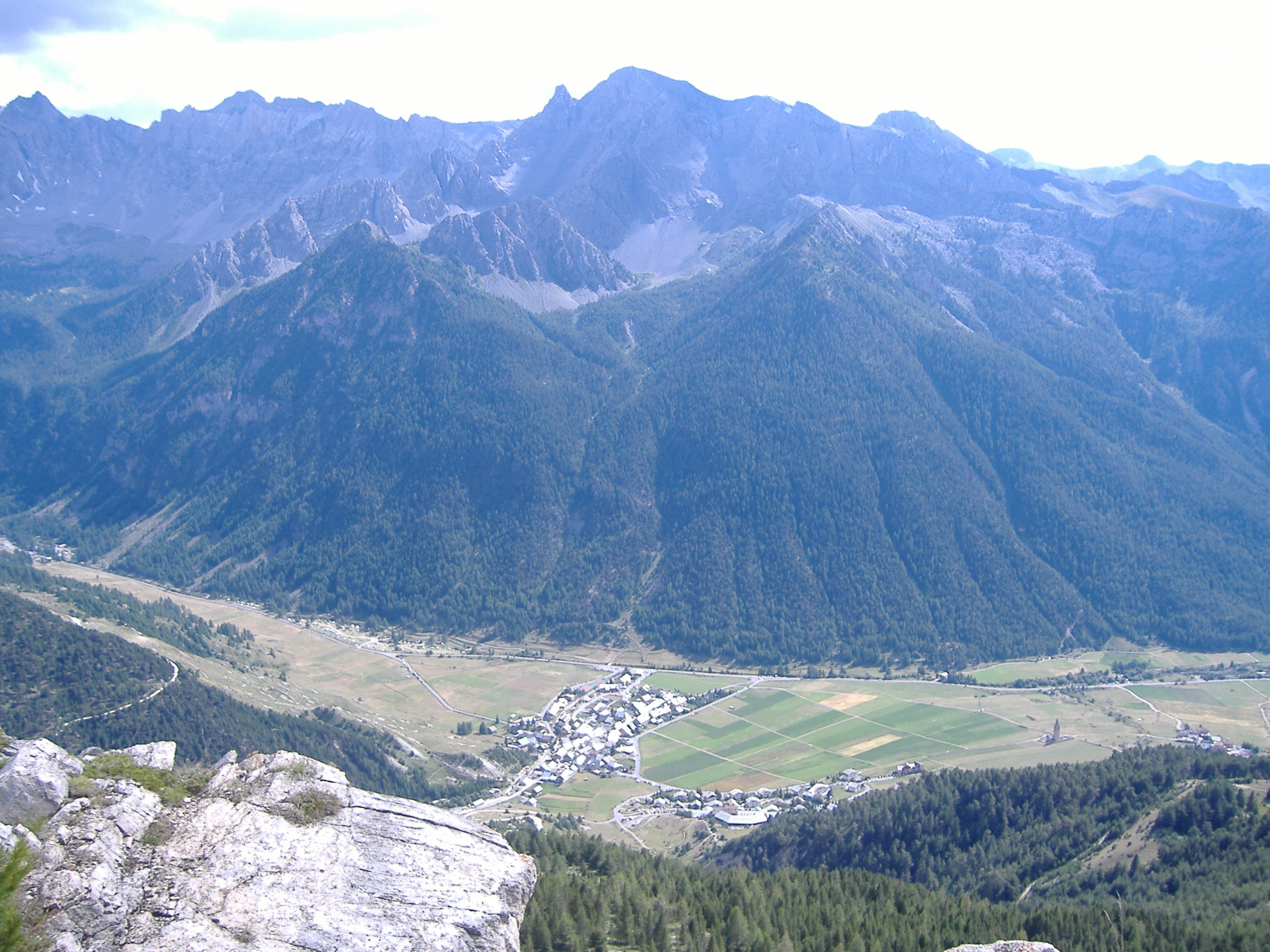
- A view of Ceillac from the nearby hillside

- Coat of arms
- Location of Ceillac
- Location within France Location within Provence-Alpes-Côte d'Azur
- Coordinates: 44°40′05″N 6°46′39″E
- Country: France
- Region: Provence-Alpes-Côte d'Azur
- Department: Hautes-Alpes
- Arrondissement: Briançon
- Canton: Guillestre
- Intercommunality: Guillestrois et Queyras

Government
  - Mayor (2026–32): Emile Chabrand
- Area^{1}: 96.05 km^{2} (37.09 sq mi)
- Elevation: 1,640 m (5,380 ft)
- Highest elevation: 3,381 m (11,093 ft)
- Lowest elevation: 1,224 m (4,016 ft)
- Population (2023): 265
  - Density: 2.76/km^{2} (7.15/sq mi)
- Time zone: UTC+01:00 (CET)
  - Summer (DST): UTC+02:00 (CEST)
- INSEE/Postal code: 05026 /05600
- ^{1} French Land Register data, which excludes lakes, ponds, glaciers > 1 km^{2} (0.386 sq mi or 247 acres) and river estuaries.

Ceillac (French pronunciation: [sɛjak]; Occitan: Celhac) is a commune in the Hautes-Alpes department in southeastern France.

== Geography ==
=== Climate ===
Ceillac has a humid continental climate (Köppen climate classification Dfb). The average annual temperature in Ceillac is 6.2 °C (43.2 °F). The average annual rainfall is 761.6 mm (29.98 in) with October as the wettest month. The temperatures are highest on average in July, at around 15.4 °C (59.7 °F), and lowest in January, at around −1.5 °C (29.3 °F). The highest temperature ever recorded in Ceillac was 31.6 °C (88.9 °F) on 27 June 2019; the coldest temperature ever recorded was −24.0 °C (−11.2 °F) on 10 February 1986.

Climate data for Ceillac (1981–2010 averages, extremes 1951−present)
Month	Jan	Feb	Mar	Apr	May	Jun	Jul	Aug	Sep	Oct	Nov	Dec	Year
Record high °C (°F)	14.5 (58.1)	16.5 (61.7)	19.5 (67.1)	22.5 (72.5)	25.0 (77.0)	31.6 (88.9)	31.0 (87.8)	29.7 (85.5)	29.3 (84.7)	24.0 (75.2)	20.2 (68.4)	16.7 (62.1)	31.6 (88.9)
Mean daily maximum °C (°F)	3.0 (37.4)	3.8 (38.8)	6.7 (44.1)	9.3 (48.7)	14.0 (57.2)	18.2 (64.8)	21.7 (71.1)	21.1 (70.0)	16.8 (62.2)	12.0 (53.6)	6.5 (43.7)	3.3 (37.9)	11.4 (52.5)
Daily mean °C (°F)	−1.5 (29.3)	−1.2 (29.8)	1.6 (34.9)	4.2 (39.6)	8.7 (47.7)	12.3 (54.1)	15.4 (59.7)	15.0 (59.0)	11.3 (52.3)	7.2 (45.0)	2.2 (36.0)	−0.8 (30.6)	6.2 (43.2)
Mean daily minimum °C (°F)	−6.0 (21.2)	−6.2 (20.8)	−3.5 (25.7)	−0.9 (30.4)	3.4 (38.1)	6.5 (43.7)	9.1 (48.4)	8.9 (48.0)	5.7 (42.3)	2.4 (36.3)	−2.1 (28.2)	−4.9 (23.2)	1.1 (34.0)
Record low °C (°F)	−22.0 (−7.6)	−24.0 (−11.2)	−23.0 (−9.4)	−14.0 (6.8)	−15.0 (5.0)	−6.0 (21.2)	−2.0 (28.4)	−2.0 (28.4)	−4.0 (24.8)	−10.0 (14.0)	−16.0 (3.2)	−21.0 (−5.8)	−24.0 (−11.2)
Average precipitation mm (inches)	47.7 (1.88)	38.0 (1.50)	45.0 (1.77)	72.6 (2.86)	69.9 (2.75)	84.3 (3.32)	56.0 (2.20)	63.3 (2.49)	75.9 (2.99)	86.0 (3.39)	63.7 (2.51)	59.2 (2.33)	761.6 (29.98)
Average precipitation days (≥ 1.0 mm)	6.5	5.6	6.5	8.9	9.8	9.5	6.7	7.4	6.6	8.5	7.1	7.4	90.6
Source: Meteociel

== Population ==
Historical population
Year	Pop.	±% p.a.
1968	208	—
1975	234	+1.70%
1982	292	+3.21%
1990	289	−0.13%
1999	276	−0.51%
2007	297	+0.92%
2012	298	+0.07%
2017	292	−0.41%
2023	265	−1.60%
Source: INSEE

== See also ==
- Communes of the Hautes-Alpes department
