= Molines-en-Queyras =

- Commune
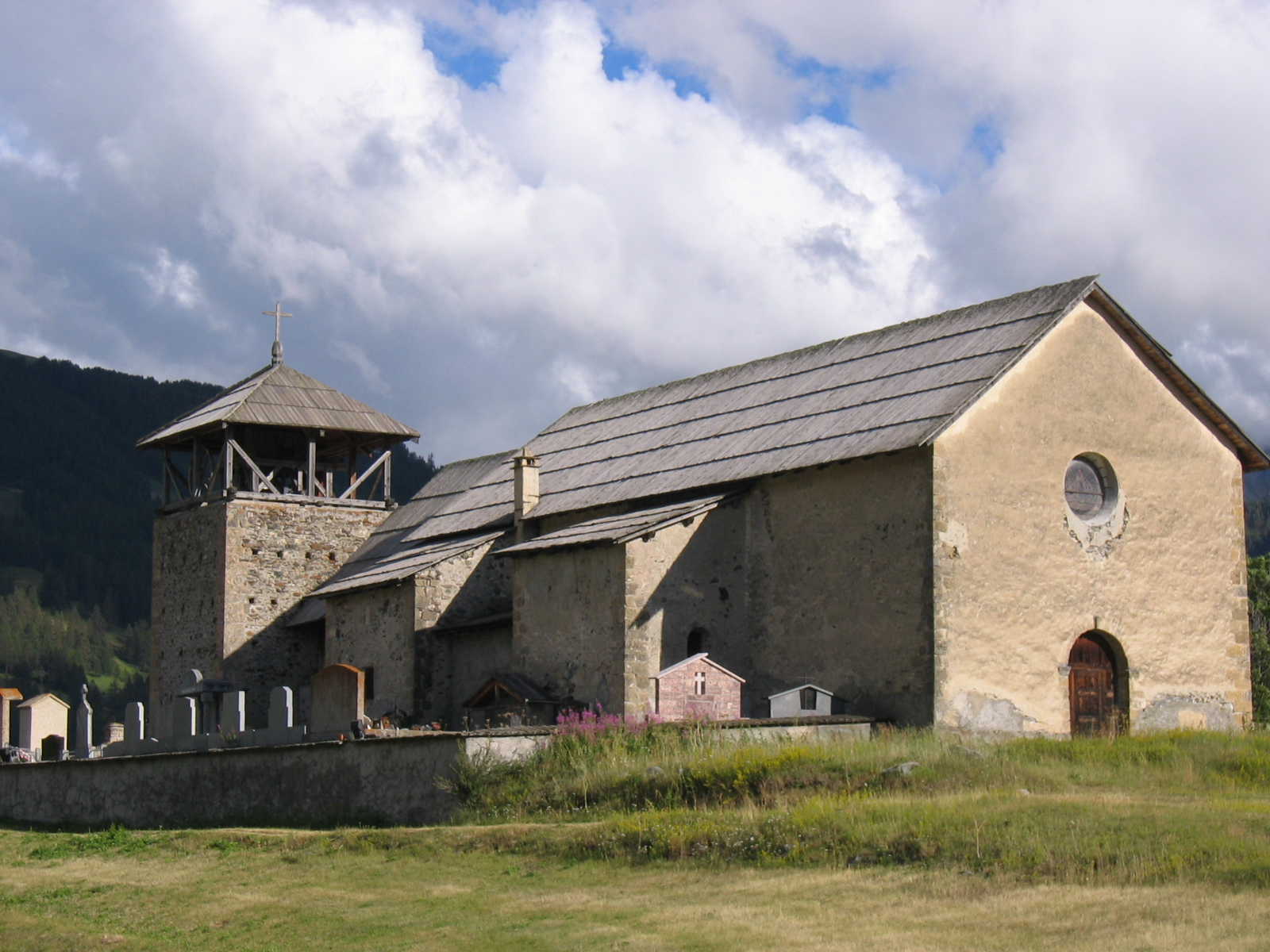
- The church of Molines-en-Queyras

- Coat of arms
- Location of Molines-en-Queyras
- Location within France Location within Provence-Alpes-Côte d'Azur
- Coordinates: 44°43′54″N 6°50′38″E
- Country: France
- Region: Provence-Alpes-Côte d'Azur
- Department: Hautes-Alpes
- Arrondissement: Briançon
- Canton: Guillestre
- Intercommunality: Guillestrois et Queyras

Government
  - Mayor (2026–32): Valérie Garcin
- Area^{1}: 53.62 km^{2} (20.70 sq mi)
- Elevation: 1,762 m (5,781 ft)
- Highest elevation: 3,160 m (10,370 ft)
- Lowest elevation: 1,625 m (5,331 ft)
- Population (2023): 307
  - Density: 5.73/km^{2} (14.8/sq mi)
- Time zone: UTC+01:00 (CET)
  - Summer (DST): UTC+02:00 (CEST)
- INSEE/Postal code: 05077 /05350
- ^{1} French Land Register data, which excludes lakes, ponds, glaciers > 1 km^{2} (0.386 sq mi or 247 acres) and river estuaries.

Molines-en-Queyras is a commune in the Hautes-Alpes department in southeastern France.

== Population ==
Historical population
Year	Pop.	±% p.a.
1968	244	—
1975	288	+2.40%
1982	375	+3.84%
1990	336	−1.36%
1999	322	−0.47%
2007	321	−0.04%
2012	308	−0.82%
2017	300	−0.52%
2023	307	+0.39%
Source: INSEE

== See also ==
- Communes of the Hautes-Alpes department
