= Canton of Guillestre =

Coordinates: 44°40′N 6°39′E

Guillestre
- Canton
- Country: France
- Region: Provence-Alpes-Côte d'Azur
- Department: Hautes-Alpes
- No. of communes: {{{nbcomm}}}
- Area: 831.55 km^{2} (321.06 sq mi)
- Population (2023): 7,991
  - Density: 9.610/km^{2} (24.89/sq mi)
- INSEE code: 05 10

The canton of Guillestre is an administrative division in the southeastern France. At the French canton reorganisation which came into effect in March 2015, the canton was expanded from 9 to 15 communes (two of which were merged into the new commune Abriès-Ristolas:

- Abriès-Ristolas
- Aiguilles
- Arvieux
- Ceillac
- Château-Ville-Vieille
- Eygliers
- Guillestre
- Molines-en-Queyras
- Mont-Dauphin
- Réotier
- Risoul
- Saint-Clément-sur-Durance
- Saint-Crépin
- Saint-Véran
- Vars

== Demographics ==
Historical population
Year	Pop.	±% p.a.
2013	8,184	—
2018	8,031	−0.38%
Source: INSEE

== See also ==
- Cantons of the Hautes-Alpes department
- Communes of France
