= Giovanni Francesco Zarbula =

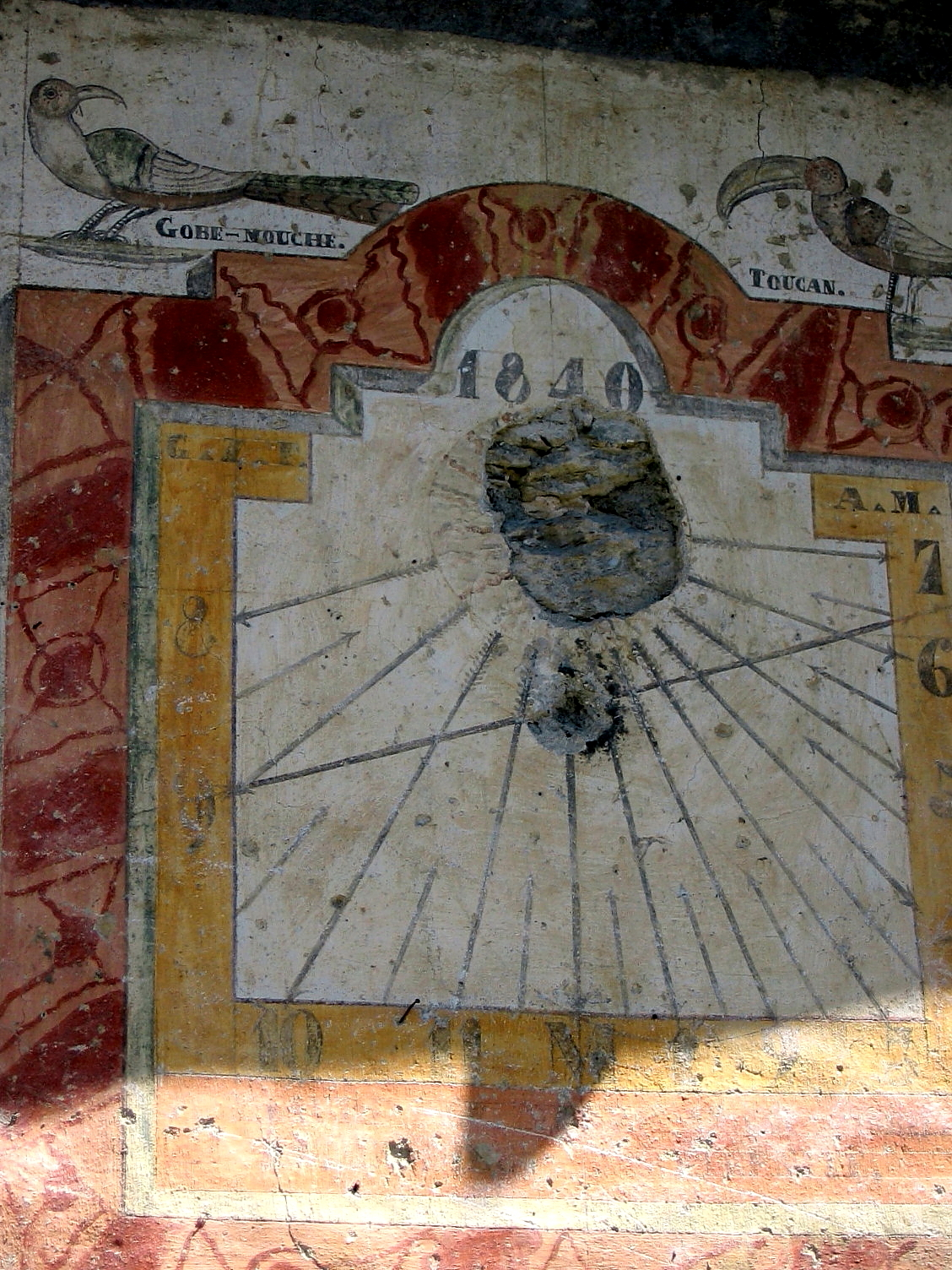
1840

Giovanni Francesco Zarbula was a mural painter and sundial designer from Piedmont Italy who created a hundred or more vertical and vertical declining sundials in the French and Italian Alpes between 1830 and 1881. He worked exclusively in Savoy, in Piémont, the Valley of the Ubaye, le Queyras and around Briançon.

== Laying out the dial ==
Zarbula's method was one of observation rather than geometric construction. He did not need to know the latitude or declination of the wall, he did not use tables or calculations; he simply worked directly on the wall. All his dial were within 2° of the 45th parallel, simplifying the construction, and all gave five-minute accuracy.

- With a plumb bob he drew a vertical line on the wall, the "Noon Line".
- He hammered a rod into the wall at right angles to the vertical, the "centre of the dial" C
- He observed and marked the shadow cast by the tip of that rod throughout a day, the hyperbolic declination line. (Note: Declination of the sun ( δ ) not declination of the wall (d))
- Using a set of compasses, he determined the line of symmetry on the wall. (Note: Indian or Hindu Circle for Sub-style determination), the "substyle line". (Note: In dialling language substyle is used like sub aqua, meaning- under the style- not like subsection, meaning a smaller part. Similarly, equation means an adjustment and height can mean a perpendicular angle.)

All the rest of the dial was laid out using a 45° square, with a 15° measure at the end. (Note: Zarbula was working within 2° of the 45th parallel, so it worked. Further north or south the triangle would need to use the latitude and co-latitude and a protractor would have been needed)

- He drew a horizontal line at a point of choice on the dial plate, the "horizon".
- The square was placed on the substyle facing outwards, sliding into any convenient position where it cuts the horizon. He drew a perpendicular line drawn to that point, the "equatorial". A line was drawn from that point to the centre of the dial, the 18h line (or 6h depending on the declination (d) of the wall). The points where the equatorial crosses the noon line and the substyle line were important.
- He placed the apex of the square on the substyle line, so the sides passed through the equatorial points (12h and 18h markers). The apex point is called the "auxiliary equatorial centre".
- A protractor or squares (Note: A combination of a 30°/ 60° square, and 45° square could also be used.) drew off 15° intervals on the equatorial. These were connected to the centre of the dial: the hour lines. The distance from the auxiliary equatorial centre to the equatorial formed the substyle height at that point.
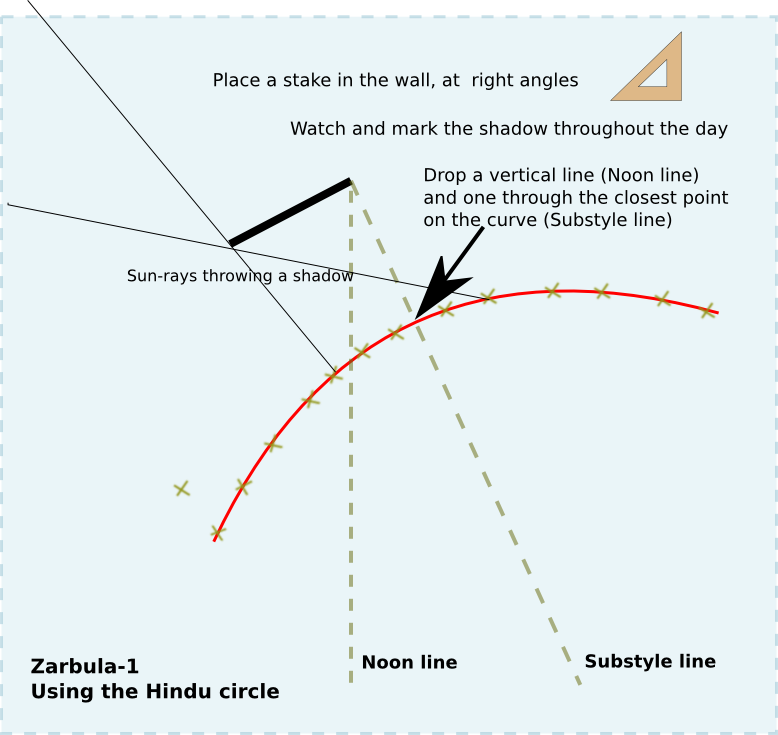

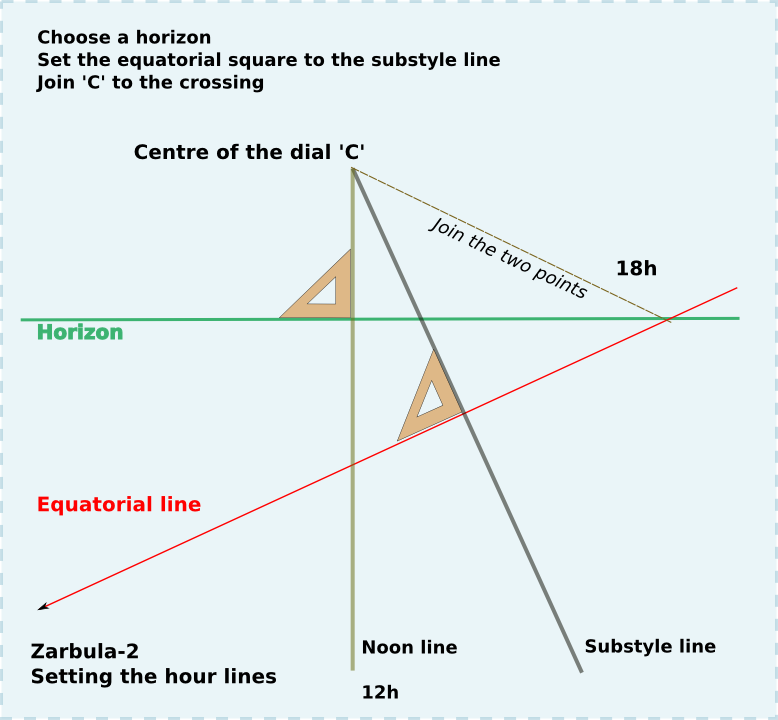

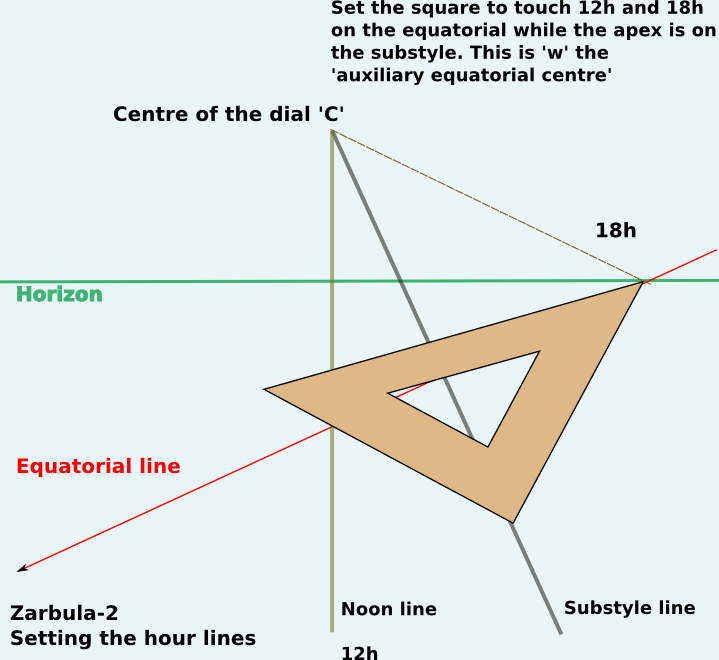

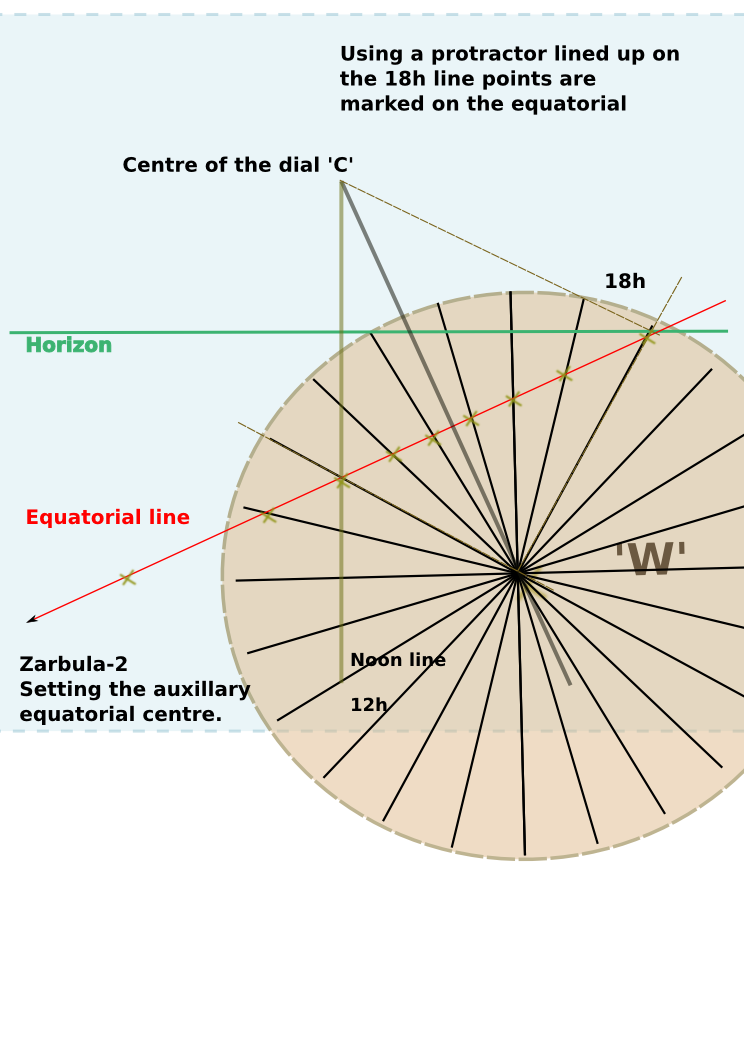

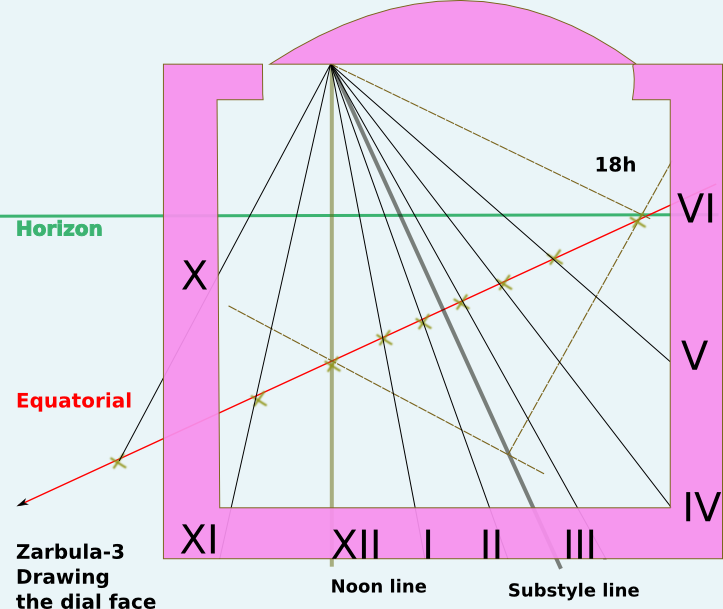

== The colours ==
Zarbula treated his paintings as frescos so the body colour was embedded in the supporting lime mortar. He didn't use organic pigments, just oxides. These do not fade in the strong alpine sunlight.

== Existing Dials (cadrans) ==
Of the hundred dials by Zarbula, about 50 have survived, and a further dozen show visible traces. In Hautes-Alpes, seven dials are protected as monument historique.

His dials can be divided into three specific styles Öiseau (Birds), Geometric, Baroque. The birds that appear in the dials of the early 1840s include toucans, jabirus, parakeets and other exotic birds not seen in these mountains. The geometric works of the late 1840s and 1850s are noted or their simplicity, and contain a little trompe-l'œil to give the design some artificial depth. The baroque dials are contain birds, vases, full trompe-l'œil and false-marbling. They contain the symbols of the Second Empire (1852-1870) and Napoleon III particularly the Imperial Eagle. The dials produced after 1865 include the Masonic device of the Square and Compasses: this is co-incidental to the rise and acceptance of masonry on both sides of the Italian French border.

Commune/Village	Lieu-dit/Hameau/Hamlet	Édifice	Region	Country	Date	Protection	Notes	Coords.	Illus.
Briançon	Saint-Blaise		Briançonnais	France	1870		Deux cadrans	44°52′34″N 6°36′48″E	
Briançon	Place d'Armes	Centre d'art contemporain	Briançonnais	France	1876		Peut-être inspiré de Zarbula	44°53′56″N 6°38′34″E	
Briançon	Saint-Blaise		Briançonnais	France	1870			44°52′33″N 6°36′49″E	
Briançon	Pont-de-Cervières, 4 chemin du Canal-du-Four		Briançonnais	France	1845			44°53′11″N 6°38′16″E	
Cervières		Maison Delouis	Briançonnais	France	1839	Base Mérimée: PA05000001, Ministère français de la Culture. (in French)	Deux cadrans	44°52′11″N 6°43′22″E	
Cervières		Hôtel de ville	Briançonnais	France				44°52′10″N 6°43′14″E	
Eygliers	Le Cros		Briançonnais	France	1841			44°40′55″N 6°37′28″E	
La Salle-les-Alpes	Les Pananches	Chapelle Saint-Jean-Baptiste	Briançonnais	France	1879		Attribué à Zarbula	44°56′22″N 6°34′57″E	
La Salle-les-Alpes	38 rue de la Guisane		Briançonnais	France	1841			44°56′44″N 6°33′47″E	
Puy-Saint-André	Pierre-Feu		Briançonnais	France	1871			44°52′18″N 6°36′00″E	
Puy-Saint-André			Briançonnais	France				44°52′45″N 6°35′57″E	
Puy-Saint-Pierre	Le Pinet, 2 rue de Jérusalem		Briançonnais	France	1842	Base Mérimée: PA00135605, Ministère français de la Culture. (in French)	Deux cadrans	44°53′26″N 6°37′31″E	
Saint-Chaffrey	Le Villard-Laté, 27 rue des Trois-Fontaines		Briançonnais	France	1847	Base Mérimée: PA00135607, Ministère français de la Culture. (in French)		44°56′12″N 6°35′40″E	
Saint-Martin-de-Queyrières	Bouchier		Briançonnais	France	1853			44°49′58″N 6°33′57″E	
Saint-Martin-de-Queyrières	Prelles		Briançonnais	France	1845			44°51′17″N 6°34′51″E	
Saint-Martin-de-Queyrières	Prelles		Briançonnais	France				44°51′14″N 6°34′49″E	
Saint-Martin-de-Queyrières		Église Saint-Martin	Briançonnais	France				44°50′25″N 6°35′07″E	
Les Orres	Le Mélezet	Église Notre-Dame-de-la-Présentation des Orres	Les Orres	France	1853	Base Mérimée: PA05000006, Ministère français de la Culture. (in French)		44°30′18″N 6°33′12″E	
Arvieux	Le Coin	Maison Jean-Paul Blanc	Queyras	France	1830		Superposition de cadrans, l'un d'eux pouvant être de Zarbula	44°46′21″N 6°43′58″E	
Arvieux			Queyras	France	1857			44°46′01″N 6°44′19″E	
Arvieux	Les Escoyères		Queyras	France	1842			44°43′08″N 6°44′39″E	
Arvieux	Les Escoyères	Chapelle Saint-Roch	Queyras	France	1857			44°43′06″N 6°44′35″E	
Château-Ville-Vieille	Ville-Vieille		Queyras	France			Attribué à Zarbula	44°45′23″N 6°47′22″E	
Château-Ville-Vieille	Clot-du-Riou		Queyras	France		Base Mérimée: PA00135602, Ministère français de la Culture. (in French)	Deux cadrans	44°45′54″N 6°46′44″E	
Château-Ville-Vieille	Ville-Vieille	Église Saint-André de Château-Ville-Vieille	Queyras	France	1843			44°45′36″N 6°49′19″E	
Château-Ville-Vieille	Ville-Vieille		Queyras	France	1843			44°45′26″N 6°47′38″E	
Château-Ville-Vieille	La Rua		Queyras	France				44°45′37″N 6°49′10″E	
Molines-en-Queyras	La Rua	Église Saint-Romain	Queyras	France	1849			44°43′53″N 6°50′20″E	
Saint-Véran	Les Forannes, la Pointe du Jour		Queyras	France	1840	Base Mérimée: PA05000004, Ministère français de la Culture. (in French)		44°42′06″N 6°51′58″E	
Saint-Véran	La Raux		Queyras	France	1840			44°41′54″N 6°51′45″E	
Saint-Véran		Ferme de Mathieu Romain	Queyras	France	1840			44°41′59″N 6°52′06″E	
Saint-Véran	Haut-Forranes		Queyras	France	1840			44°42′11″N 6°51′54″E	
Saint-Véran	Pierre-Belle		Queyras	France	1840			44°41′55″N 6°52′09″E	
Saint-Véran	Les Gabelous	Ancienne douane	Queyras	France	1858			44°41′57″N 6°52′12″E	
Saint-Paul-sur-Ubaye	Petite-Serennes		Ubaye	France	1860			44°31′44″N 6°46′28″E	
Saint-Paul-sur-Ubaye	Maljasset		Ubaye	France	1860			44°35′34″N 6°50′35″E	
Pragela	Souchères Basses	Chapelle	Val Cluson	Italie	1872			45°01′47″N 6°57′39″E	
Pragela	Traverse, 6 via Nazionale		Val Cluson	Italie				45°00′00″N 6°55′34″E	
Pragela	Villarmont		Val Cluson	Italie	1872			45°00′01″N 6°55′00″E	
Sauze di Cesana	Rollieres	Chapelle	Val Cluson	Italie	1870		Deux cadrans	44°56′15″N 6°49′56″E	
Sestrières	Champlas du Col, 28 via Nazionale		Val Cluson	Italie	1870			44°56′51″N 6°51′06″E	
Sestrières	Champlas du Col, 7 via Nazionale		Val Cluson	Italie	1870			44°56′52″N 6°51′10″E	
Sestrières	Borgata		Val Cluson	Italie	1872			44°58′20″N 6°53′44″E	
Sestrières	Borgata, 14 via del Colle		Val Cluson	Italie	1872			44°58′20″N 6°53′45″E	
Sestrières	Borgata, 12a via del Colle		Val Cluson	Italie	1872			44°58′19″N 6°53′44″E	
Usseaux	Balboutet		Val Cluson	Italie	1833		Deux cadrans	45°03′07″N 7°00′49″E	
Névache	Ville-Haute	Église Saint-Marcellin de Névache	Vallée de la Clarée	France				45°01′08″N 6°36′17″E	
Val-des-Prés	Pra-Premier		Vallée de la Clarée	France	1843	Base Mérimée: PA00135609, Ministère français de la Culture. (in French)		44°57′06″N 6°40′32″E	
Val-des-Prés	La Vachette		Vallée de la Clarée	France	1840			44°55′03″N 6°40′31″E	
Val-des-Prés	La Vachette		Vallée de la Clarée	France	1852			44°55′00″N 6°40′26″E	
Valloire			Valloire	France				45°09′55″N 6°25′39″E	
Valloire	Les Verneys		Valloire	France				45°08′59″N 6°25′14″E	
Vallouise		Maison de Bardonèche	Vallouise	France	1840	Base Palissy: IM05003855, Ministère français de la Culture. (in French)	Deux cadrans	44°50′40″N 6°29′08″E	
Vallouise	Le Villard	Chapelle Saint-Sébastien	Vallouise	France	1869	Base Palissy: IM05003852, Ministère français de la Culture. (in French)	Deux cadrans	44°50′30″N 6°28′22″E	
Valserres	Les Trancs			France	1854			44°29′30″N 6°07′24″E	
