= Canton of Le Monêtier-les-Bains =

Coordinates: 44°58′37″N 6°30′34″E

Le Monêtier-les-Bains
- Former canton
- Interactive map of Le Monêtier-les-Bains
- Country: France
- Region: Provence-Alpes-Côte d'Azur
- Department: Hautes-Alpes
- No. of communes: {{{nbcomm}}}
- Disbanded: 2015
- Area: 159.17 km^{2} (61.46 sq mi)
- Population (2012): 3,606
  - Density: 22.66/km^{2} (58.68/sq mi)

The canton of Le Monêtier-les-Bains is a former administrative division in southeastern France. It was disbanded following the French canton reorganisation which came into effect in March 2015. It consisted of 3 communes, which joined the new canton of Briançon-1 in 2015. It had 3,606 inhabitants (2012).

The canton comprised the following communes:

- Le Monêtier-les-Bains
- Saint-Chaffrey
- La Salle les Alpes

== Demographics ==
Historical population Canton of Le Monêtier-les-Bains
Year	1962	1968	1975	1982	1990	1999
Pop.	2,081	2,338	2,570	3,266	3,392	3,554
±%	—	+12.3%	+9.9%	+27.1%	+3.9%	+4.8%
From the year 1962 on: No double counting – residents of multiple communes (e.g. students and military personnel) are counted only once. Source: INSEE

== See also ==
- Cantons of the Hautes-Alpes department
