= Serre-Chevalier Altiport =

Defunct airport in Briançon, France

Altiport de Serre-Chevalier
- IATA: SEC; ICAO: none

Summary
- Airport type: Defunct
- Serves: Briançon, France
- Location: Briançon, France
- Coordinates: 44°57′12″N 006°33′00″E

Map
- Location in France

Runways
Direction	Length		Surface
Direction	ft	m	Surface
NW/SE		1,000x40	Asphalt

Serre-Chevalier Altiport (also known as Villeneuve) is a former private altiport and resort in Briançon, France.

== History ==
In the 1960s, developer André Jullien visited Briançon, and was intrigued by the idea of flying over the mountains since the area was inaccessible by road during periods of heavy snowfall. He later purchased a plot of land in La Salle-les-Alpes along the Guisane river. He began the construction of the Serre-Chevalier Altiport which featured a 1000-meter long runway, and accommodations including a 70-room luxury hotel, a restaurant, saunas, a nightclub, a heated swimming pool, a pharmacy and a horse stable. This allowed tourist planes to land in the valley. In 1965, the airfield was opened after extensive excavation, and the runway was considered one of the longest in its class in Europe at the time. It was used by wealthy private plane travelers from across Europe.

In the 1970s Air Alpes provided service to the altiport, bringing passengers to the nearby ski resorts in the Briançon area, with master pilot Michel Ziegler at the controls. To land on the runway, pilots would have to have specisl qualifications, and there were only 350 pilots in the world qualified for mountains at the time.

== Closure ==
In 1973, the creation of the Écrins National Park which protected 92,000 hectares of mountains prevented further development, leading to the altiport's closure in 1976.

=== Redevelopment ===
In the 1980s, the airfield was dismantled, and the site was later converted into tennis courts and an automobile ice racing circuit. Only two hangars remain today.

The site is currently occupied by the Briançon Sports Park, which features several courts for volleyball and tennis.

The runway was removed, and was replaced by buildings. As for the runway threshold on the west side, it has become an ice circuit for automobiles. The Guisane river still flows through the area.
