= François Labande =

French mountaineer, ecologist and writer (1941–2025)

- Born: 11 May 1941; Toulon, France
- Died: 20 March 2025 (aged 83); La Salle-les-Alpes, France
- Education: Supélec
- Occupations: Mountaineer, ecologist, writer

François Labande (11 May 1941 – 20 March 2025) was a French mountaineer, ecologist and writer.

== Life and career ==
Born in Toulon on 11 May 1941, Labande developed a passion for mountaineering in the Oisans mountains. He graduated from the Supélec engineering school in 1963 and became a math teacher. He became familiar with mountaineering techniques with the Union nationale des centres sportifs de plein air and took part in major climbs in France and Switzerland, including the south face of the Meije, the South Pillar of the Barre des Écrins and the northeast face of Piz Badile. In 1987, he succeeded Lucien Devies as editor of the Guide Vallot, which published the Guide du mont Blanc and the Guide du Haut-Dauphiné.

Labande was a founding member of the French chapter of Mountain Wilderness and took leave from the Ministry of National Education to promote the NGO. He served as president from 1995 to 2002 before becoming honorary president and one of its international guarantors. Additionally, he relaunched the French chapter of the International Commission for the Protection of the Alps and campaigned against development projects in Vanoise National Park. His 2004 book Sauver la montagne advocated for the Tibetan cause across the French Alps from Nice to Geneva.

François Labande died in La Salle-les-Alpes on 20 March 2025, at the age of 83.

== Works ==
=== Guides ===
==== Mountaineering ====
- Grandes courses (1980)
- Cent sommets (1992)
- La Chaîne du Mont-Blanc: Guide Vallot. Sélection de voies (1987)
- Guide du Haut-Dauphiné: Massif des Écrins (1995, 1996, 1997)

==== Skiing ====
- Ski sauvage (1983)
- Ski de randonnée Haute-Savoie, Mont-Blanc - 170 itinéraires de ski-alpinisme (1990)
- Ski de randonnée Haut Valais (1996)
- Ski de randonnée Valais central (2002)
- Ski de randonnée Ouest-Suisse (2004)

==== Hiking ====
- Randonnée pédestre Provence méridionale et Côte d'Azur - 110 itinéraires d'une journée (2002)
- Dans les montagnes de Suisse romande : 100 itinéraires de randonnée pédestre du Jura aux Alpes (2003)
- Randonnée pédestre Haute-Provence - 108 itinéraires de tous niveaux (2004)
- Randonnée pédestre dans le Parc National des Écrins (2006)

=== Other works ===
- Sauver la montagne (2004)
- La Tempête du désert blanc (2004)
- La Clé dans le parfum (2010)
- Traces écrites (2011)
- La Saga des Écrins (2014)
- La Ligne d'horizon (2016)
- L'Échelle de l'espoir (2020)

== Distinctions ==
- Knight of the Legion of Honour (1999)
