= Felix Neff =

Swiss minister and philanthropist (1797–1829)

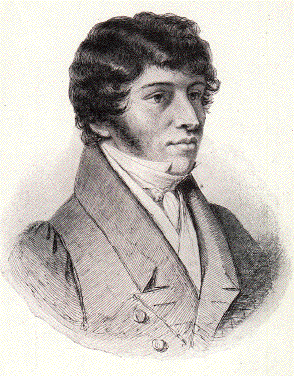
FÉLIX NEFF (1797-1829).gif

Felix Neff (8 October 1797 – 12 April 1829), Swiss Protestant divine and philanthropist, was born at Geneva, Republic of Geneva. Originally a sergeant of artillery, he decided in 1819 to devote himself entirely to evangelistic work. He was ordained to the ministry in 1822, and soon afterwards settled in the valley of Freissinières, where he labored in the manner of J. F. Oberlin, being at one and the same time pastor, schoolmaster, engineer and agriculturist. He was so successful that he changed the character of the district and its inhabitants. In 1827, worn out by his labors, he was obliged to return to his native place, where he died two years later.
