= Lac de Souliers =

Lake in France

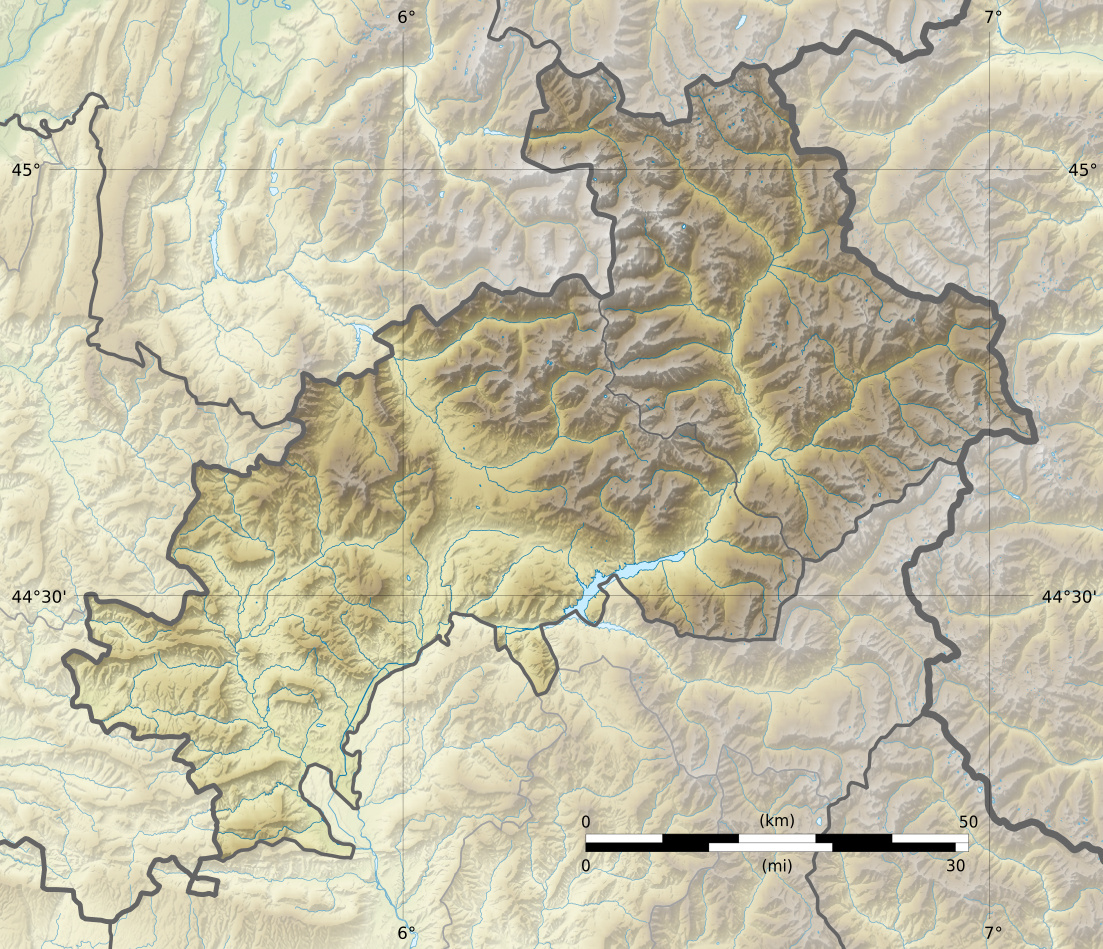
- Location within Hautes-Alpes
- Location: Hautes-Alpes
- Coordinates: 44°48′26″N 6°46′23″E
- Basin countries: France
- Surface elevation: 2,492 m (8,176 ft)

Lac de Souliers is a lake in Hautes-Alpes, France.

It is located in the commune of Château-Ville-Vieille, under the Col d'Izoard.
