= Pelvoux =

Commune in Haute-Alpes, France

- Part of Vallouise-Pelvoux
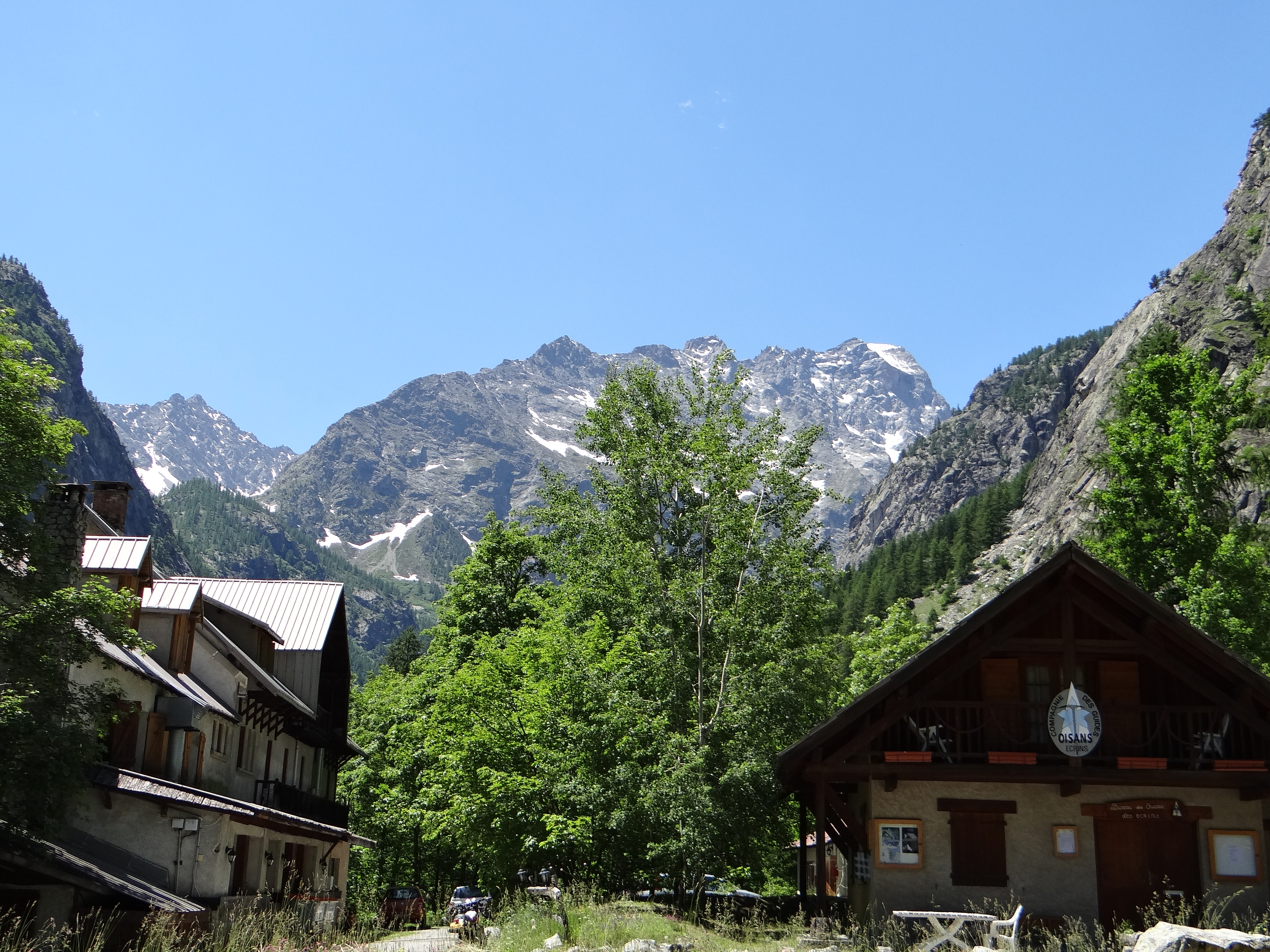
- The hamlet of Ailefroide, in Pelvoux, with the guide's office in the valley of Celse Nière
- Location of Pelvoux
- Location within France Location within Provence-Alpes-Côte d'Azur
- Coordinates: 44°51′56″N 6°29′22″E
- Country: France
- Region: Provence-Alpes-Côte d'Azur
- Department: Hautes-Alpes
- Arrondissement: Briançon
- Canton: L'Argentière-la-Bessée
- Commune: Vallouise-Pelvoux
- Area^{1}: 76.23 km^{2} (29.43 sq mi)
- Highest elevation: 4,101 m (13,455 ft)
- Lowest elevation: 1,179 m (3,868 ft)
- Population (2018): 430
  - Density: 5.6/km^{2} (15/sq mi)
- Time zone: UTC+01:00 (CET)
  - Summer (DST): UTC+02:00 (CEST)
- Postal code: 05340
- ^{1} French Land Register data, which excludes lakes, ponds, glaciers > 1 km^{2} (0.386 sq mi or 247 acres) and river estuaries.

Pelvoux (French pronunciation: [pɛlvu]; Vivaro-Alpine: Pelvós) is a former commune in the Hautes-Alpes department in the Provence-Alpes-Côte d'Azur region in southeastern France. On 1 January 2017, it was merged into the new commune Vallouise-Pelvoux.

Pelvoux bid to be the French candidate city for the 2018 Winter Olympics, but the French National Olympic and Sports Committee chose to submit Annecy's bid instead.

== Geography ==
=== Climate ===
Pelvoux has a humid continental climate (Köppen climate classification Dfb). The average annual temperature in Pelvoux is 7.8 °C (46.0 °F). The average annual rainfall is 970.5 mm (38.21 in) with October as the wettest month. The temperatures are highest on average in July, at around 17.1 °C (62.8 °F), and lowest in January, at around −1.1 °C (30.0 °F). The highest temperature ever recorded in Pelvoux was 35.7 °C (96.3 °F) on 27 June 2019; the coldest temperature ever recorded was −21.8 °C (−7.2 °F) on 7 March 1971.

Climate data for Pelvoux (1981–2010 averages, extremes 1961−present)
Month	Jan	Feb	Mar	Apr	May	Jun	Jul	Aug	Sep	Oct	Nov	Dec	Year
Record high °C (°F)	18.1 (64.6)	21.2 (70.2)	23.3 (73.9)	26.4 (79.5)	29.2 (84.6)	35.7 (96.3)	34.0 (93.2)	34.1 (93.4)	32.9 (91.2)	27.7 (81.9)	21.6 (70.9)	17.1 (62.8)	35.7 (96.3)
Mean daily maximum °C (°F)	3.8 (38.8)	6.2 (43.2)	10.0 (50.0)	12.6 (54.7)	18.0 (64.4)	22.6 (72.7)	25.7 (78.3)	25.3 (77.5)	20.4 (68.7)	14.7 (58.5)	7.9 (46.2)	3.7 (38.7)	14.3 (57.7)
Daily mean °C (°F)	−1.1 (30.0)	0.2 (32.4)	3.5 (38.3)	6.4 (43.5)	11.3 (52.3)	14.9 (58.8)	17.1 (62.8)	16.9 (62.4)	13.0 (55.4)	8.6 (47.5)	2.8 (37.0)	−0.7 (30.7)	7.8 (46.0)
Mean daily minimum °C (°F)	−6.1 (21.0)	−5.7 (21.7)	−3.1 (26.4)	0.1 (32.2)	4.6 (40.3)	7.1 (44.8)	8.6 (47.5)	8.5 (47.3)	5.5 (41.9)	2.5 (36.5)	−2.2 (28.0)	−5.2 (22.6)	1.3 (34.3)
Record low °C (°F)	−19.0 (−2.2)	−18.0 (−0.4)	−21.8 (−7.2)	−10.2 (13.6)	−4.5 (23.9)	−1.6 (29.1)	0.0 (32.0)	0.0 (32.0)	−3.0 (26.6)	−9.0 (15.8)	−15.0 (5.0)	−18.0 (−0.4)	−21.8 (−7.2)
Average precipitation mm (inches)	82.7 (3.26)	63.0 (2.48)	70.1 (2.76)	91.5 (3.60)	81.0 (3.19)	71.9 (2.83)	48.9 (1.93)	54.8 (2.16)	86.9 (3.42)	115.4 (4.54)	100.2 (3.94)	104.1 (4.10)	970.5 (38.21)
Average precipitation days (≥ 1.0 mm)	7.5	6.3	7.5	8.7	10.2	9.0	7.0	7.2	7.2	9.4	7.7	8.3	96.1
Source: Meteociel

== See also ==
- Communes of the Hautes-Alpes department
