= Les Vigneaux =

- Commune
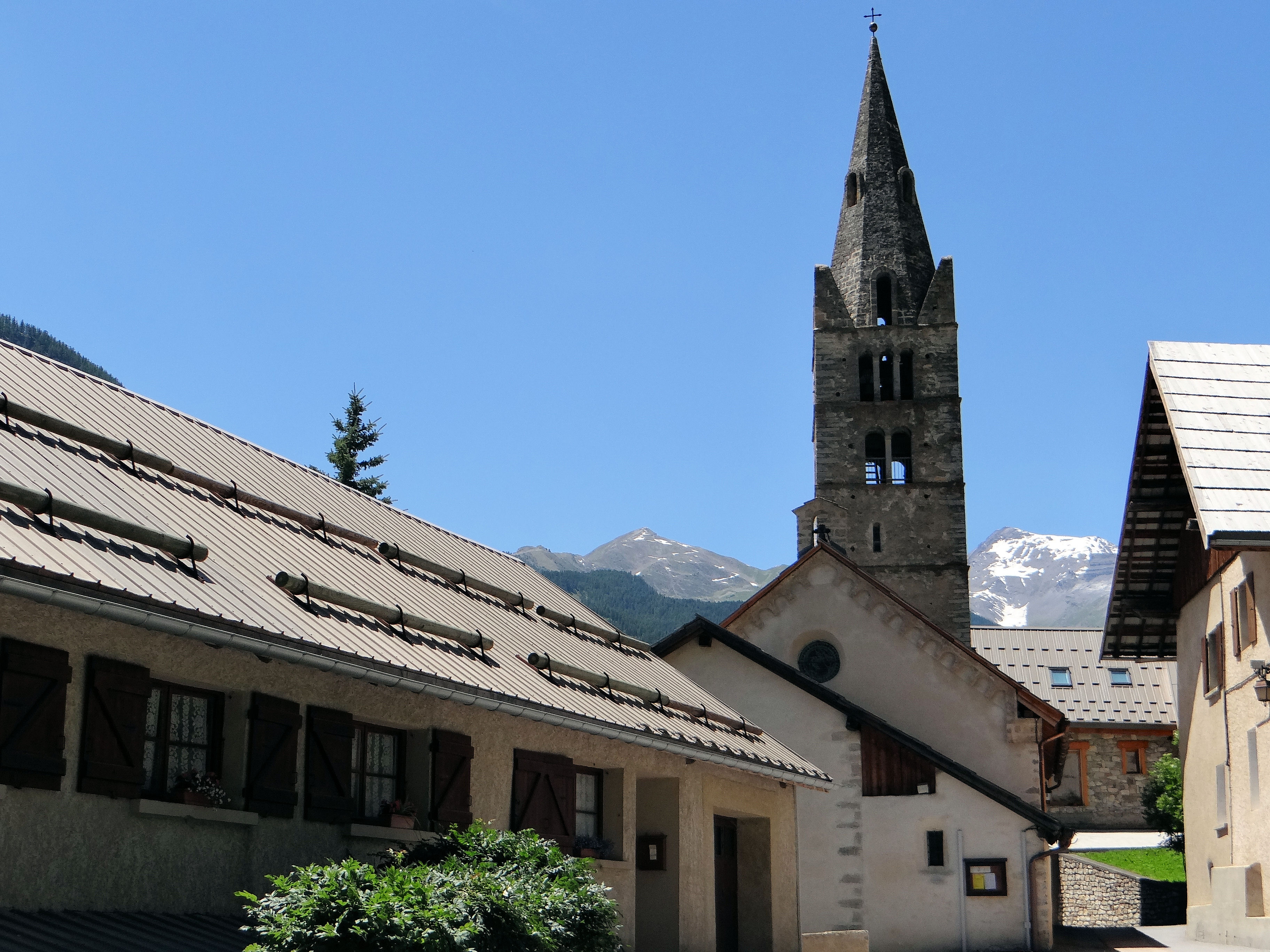
- The church of Saint-Laurent, in Les Vigneaux

- Coat of arms
- Location of Les Vigneaux
- Location within France Location within Provence-Alpes-Côte d'Azur
- Coordinates: 44°49′29″N 6°32′29″E
- Country: France
- Region: Provence-Alpes-Côte d'Azur
- Department: Hautes-Alpes
- Arrondissement: Briançon
- Canton: L'Argentière-la-Bessée
- Intercommunality: Pays des Écrins

Government
  - Mayor (2026–32): Gilles Pierre
- Area^{1}: 15.99 km^{2} (6.17 sq mi)
- Elevation: 1,120 m (3,670 ft)
- Highest elevation: 2,800 m (9,200 ft)
- Lowest elevation: 978 m (3,209 ft)
- Population (2023): 510
  - Density: 32/km^{2} (83/sq mi)
- Time zone: UTC+01:00 (CET)
  - Summer (DST): UTC+02:00 (CEST)
- INSEE/Postal code: 05180 /05120
- ^{1} French Land Register data, which excludes lakes, ponds, glaciers > 1 km^{2} (0.386 sq mi or 247 acres) and river estuaries.

Les Vigneaux (French pronunciation: [le viɲo]; Occitan: Los Vinhaus) is a commune in the Hautes-Alpes department in southeastern France.

== Population ==
Historical population
Year	Pop.	±% p.a.
1968	208	—
1975	190	−1.28%
1982	244	+3.64%
1990	346	+4.46%
1999	390	+1.34%
2007	468	+2.31%
2012	491	+0.96%
2017	534	+1.69%
2023	510	−0.76%
Source: INSEE

== See also ==
- Communes of the Hautes-Alpes department
