= Vallouise-Pelvoux =

- Commune
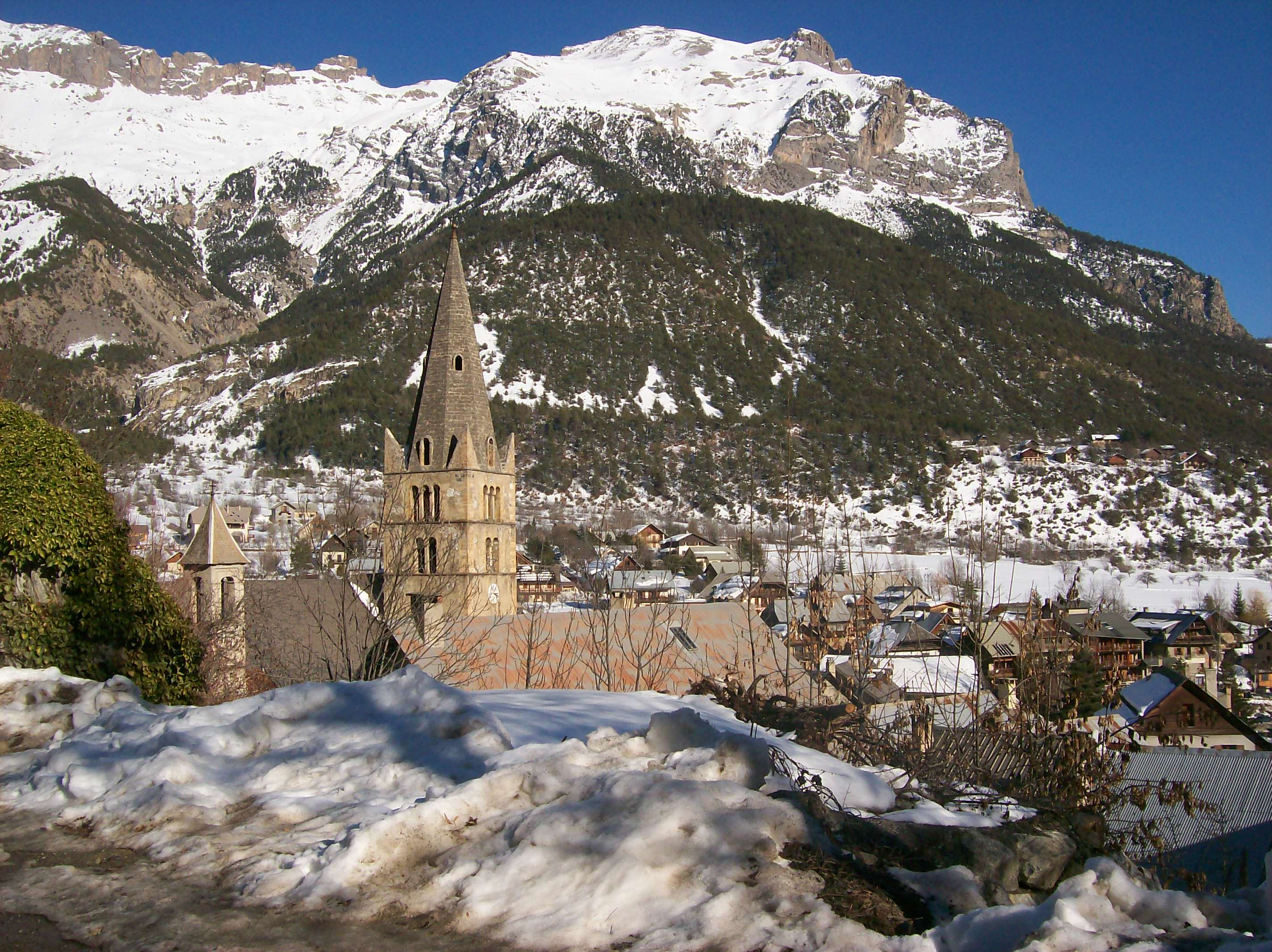
- A view of Vallouise in winter
- Location of Vallouise-Pelvoux
- Location within France Location within Provence-Alpes-Côte d'Azur
- Coordinates: 44°51′54″N 6°29′20″E
- Country: France
- Region: Provence-Alpes-Côte d'Azur
- Department: Hautes-Alpes
- Arrondissement: Briançon
- Canton: L'Argentière-la-Bessée
- Intercommunality: Pays des Écrins

Government
  - Mayor (2026–32): Gaëlle Moreau
- Area^{1}: 144.81 km^{2} (55.91 sq mi)
- Population (2023): 1,138
  - Density: 7.859/km^{2} (20.35/sq mi)
- Time zone: UTC+01:00 (CET)
  - Summer (DST): UTC+02:00 (CEST)
- INSEE/Postal code: 05101 /05290, 05340
- ^{1} French Land Register data, which excludes lakes, ponds, glaciers > 1 km^{2} (0.386 sq mi or 247 acres) and river estuaries.

Vallouise-Pelvoux (French pronunciation: [valwiz pɛlvu]) is a commune in the department of Hautes-Alpes, southeastern France. The municipality was established on 1 January 2017 by merger of the former communes of Pelvoux (the seat) and Vallouise.

The commune is located in the Alps and contains part of the Écrins National Park.

It is a popular destination for mountaineering and mountain sports in all seasons.

== Geography ==
=== Climate ===
Vallouise-Pelvoux has a humid continental climate (Köppen climate classification Dfb). The average annual temperature in Vallouise-Pelvoux is 7.8 °C (46.0 °F). The average annual rainfall is 970.5 mm (38.21 in) with October as the wettest month. The temperatures are highest on average in July, at around 17.1 °C (62.8 °F), and lowest in January, at around −1.1 °C (30.0 °F). The highest temperature ever recorded in Vallouise-Pelvoux was 35.7 °C (96.3 °F) on 27 June 2019; the coldest temperature ever recorded was −21.8 °C (−7.2 °F) on 7 March 1971.

Climate data for Pelvoux, Vallouise-Pelvoux (1981–2010 averages, extremes 1961−present)
Month	Jan	Feb	Mar	Apr	May	Jun	Jul	Aug	Sep	Oct	Nov	Dec	Year
Record high °C (°F)	18.1 (64.6)	21.2 (70.2)	23.3 (73.9)	26.4 (79.5)	29.2 (84.6)	35.7 (96.3)	34.0 (93.2)	34.1 (93.4)	32.9 (91.2)	27.7 (81.9)	21.6 (70.9)	17.1 (62.8)	35.7 (96.3)
Mean daily maximum °C (°F)	3.8 (38.8)	6.2 (43.2)	10.0 (50.0)	12.6 (54.7)	18.0 (64.4)	22.6 (72.7)	25.7 (78.3)	25.3 (77.5)	20.4 (68.7)	14.7 (58.5)	7.9 (46.2)	3.7 (38.7)	14.3 (57.7)
Daily mean °C (°F)	−1.1 (30.0)	0.2 (32.4)	3.5 (38.3)	6.4 (43.5)	11.3 (52.3)	14.9 (58.8)	17.1 (62.8)	16.9 (62.4)	13.0 (55.4)	8.6 (47.5)	2.8 (37.0)	−0.7 (30.7)	7.8 (46.0)
Mean daily minimum °C (°F)	−6.1 (21.0)	−5.7 (21.7)	−3.1 (26.4)	0.1 (32.2)	4.6 (40.3)	7.1 (44.8)	8.6 (47.5)	8.5 (47.3)	5.5 (41.9)	2.5 (36.5)	−2.2 (28.0)	−5.2 (22.6)	1.3 (34.3)
Record low °C (°F)	−19.0 (−2.2)	−18.0 (−0.4)	−21.8 (−7.2)	−10.2 (13.6)	−4.5 (23.9)	−1.6 (29.1)	0.0 (32.0)	0.0 (32.0)	−3.0 (26.6)	−9.0 (15.8)	−15.0 (5.0)	−18.0 (−0.4)	−21.8 (−7.2)
Average precipitation mm (inches)	82.7 (3.26)	63.0 (2.48)	70.1 (2.76)	91.5 (3.60)	81.0 (3.19)	71.9 (2.83)	48.9 (1.93)	54.8 (2.16)	86.9 (3.42)	115.4 (4.54)	100.2 (3.94)	104.1 (4.10)	970.5 (38.21)
Average precipitation days (≥ 1.0 mm)	7.5	6.3	7.5	8.7	10.2	9.0	7.0	7.2	7.2	9.4	7.7	8.3	96.1
Source: Meteociel

== See also ==
- Communes of the Hautes-Alpes department
