= L'Argentière-la-Bessée =

- Commune
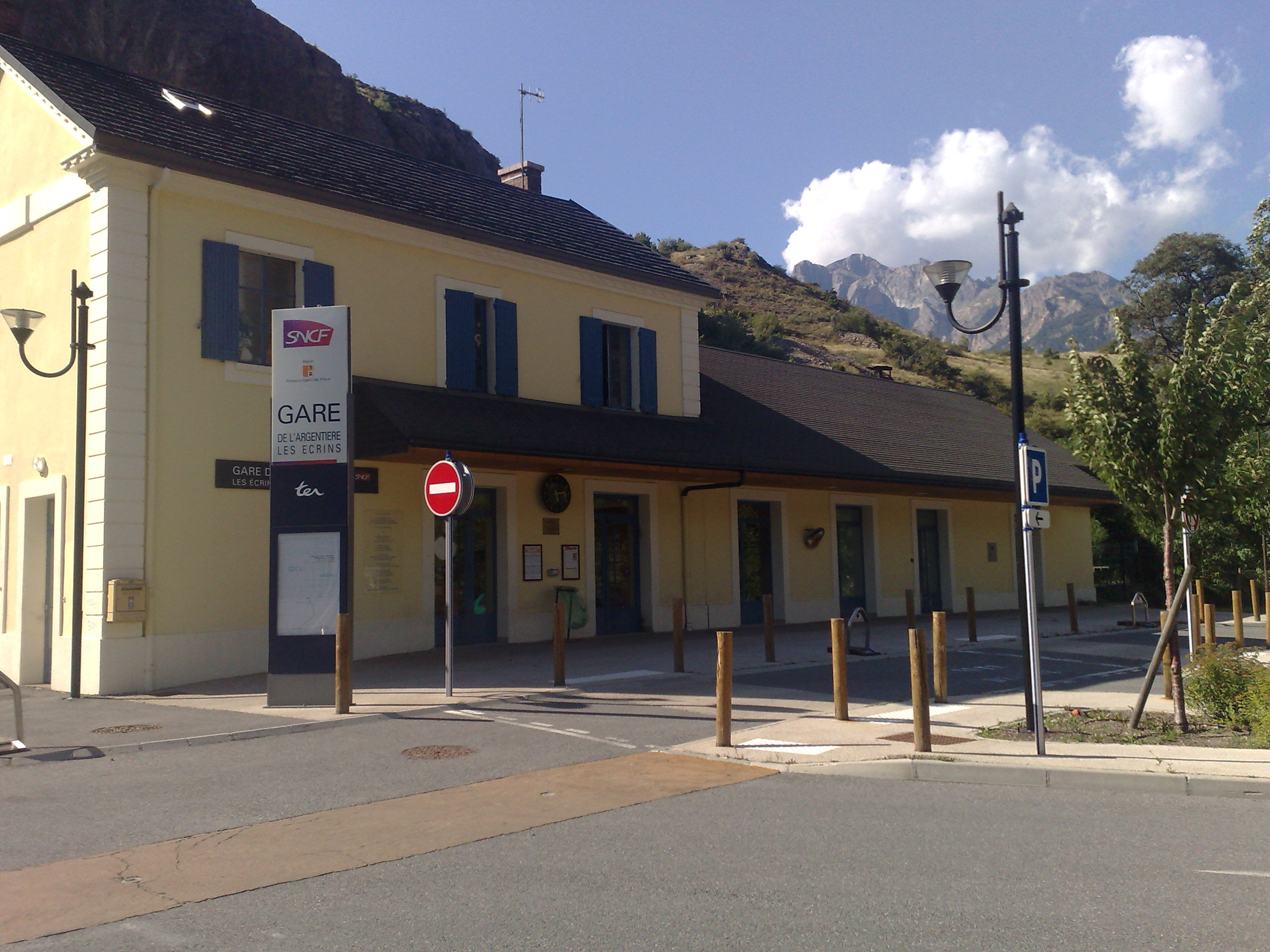
- The L'Argentière-les Écrins railway station

- Coat of arms
- Location of L'Argentière-la-Bessée
- Location within France Location within Provence-Alpes-Côte d'Azur
- Coordinates: 44°47′43″N 6°33′36″E
- Country: France
- Region: Provence-Alpes-Côte d'Azur
- Department: Hautes-Alpes
- Arrondissement: Briançon
- Canton: L'Argentière-la-Bessée
- Intercommunality: Pays des Écrins

Government
  - Mayor (2026–32): Rémi Roux
- Area^{1}: 64.55 km^{2} (24.92 sq mi)
- Elevation: 976 m (3,202 ft)
- Highest elevation: 3,243 m (10,640 ft)
- Lowest elevation: 945 m (3,100 ft)
- Population (2023): 2,288
  - Density: 35.45/km^{2} (91.80/sq mi)
- Time zone: UTC+01:00 (CET)
  - Summer (DST): UTC+02:00 (CEST)
- INSEE/Postal code: 05006 /05120
- ^{1} French Land Register data, which excludes lakes, ponds, glaciers > 1 km^{2} (0.386 sq mi or 247 acres) and river estuaries.

L'Argentière-la-Bessée (French pronunciation: [laʁʒɑ̃tjɛʁ la bɛse]; Occitan: L'Argentièra) is a commune of the Hautes-Alpes department in the Alps in southeastern France.

The town lies on the River Durance, which is used for kayaking, white-water rafting and other water sports. The Argentiere Canoe Slalom Course is in the Durance River south of the town. The town is located on the edge of the Écrins National Park. There is an SNCF station in the town with trains running to Briançon and Paris. The village has an old silver mine (which is where the name of L'Argentière comes from), which is now open for tourists.

== Population ==
Historical population
Year	Pop.	±% p.a.
1968	2,395	—
1975	2,434	+0.23%
1982	2,497	+0.37%
1990	2,191	−1.62%
1999	2,289	+0.49%
2007	2,304	+0.08%
2012	2,318	+0.12%
2017	2,279	−0.34%
2023	2,288	+0.07%
Source: INSEE

== See also ==
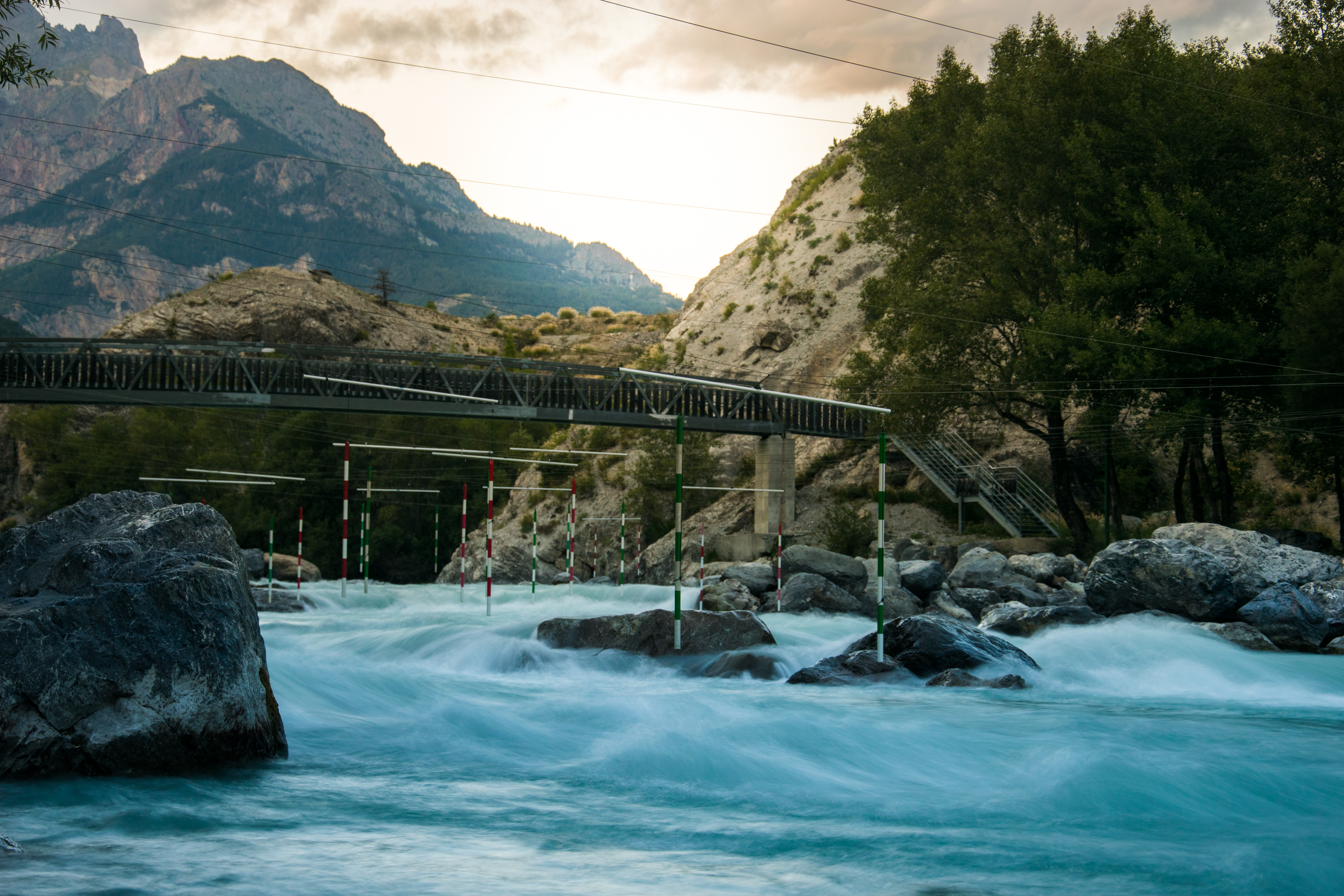
Argentiere Canoe Slalom Course

- Écrins National Park
- Durance
- Communes of the Hautes-Alpes department
