= Vallouise =

Commune in Haute-Alpes, France

- Part of Vallouise-Pelvoux
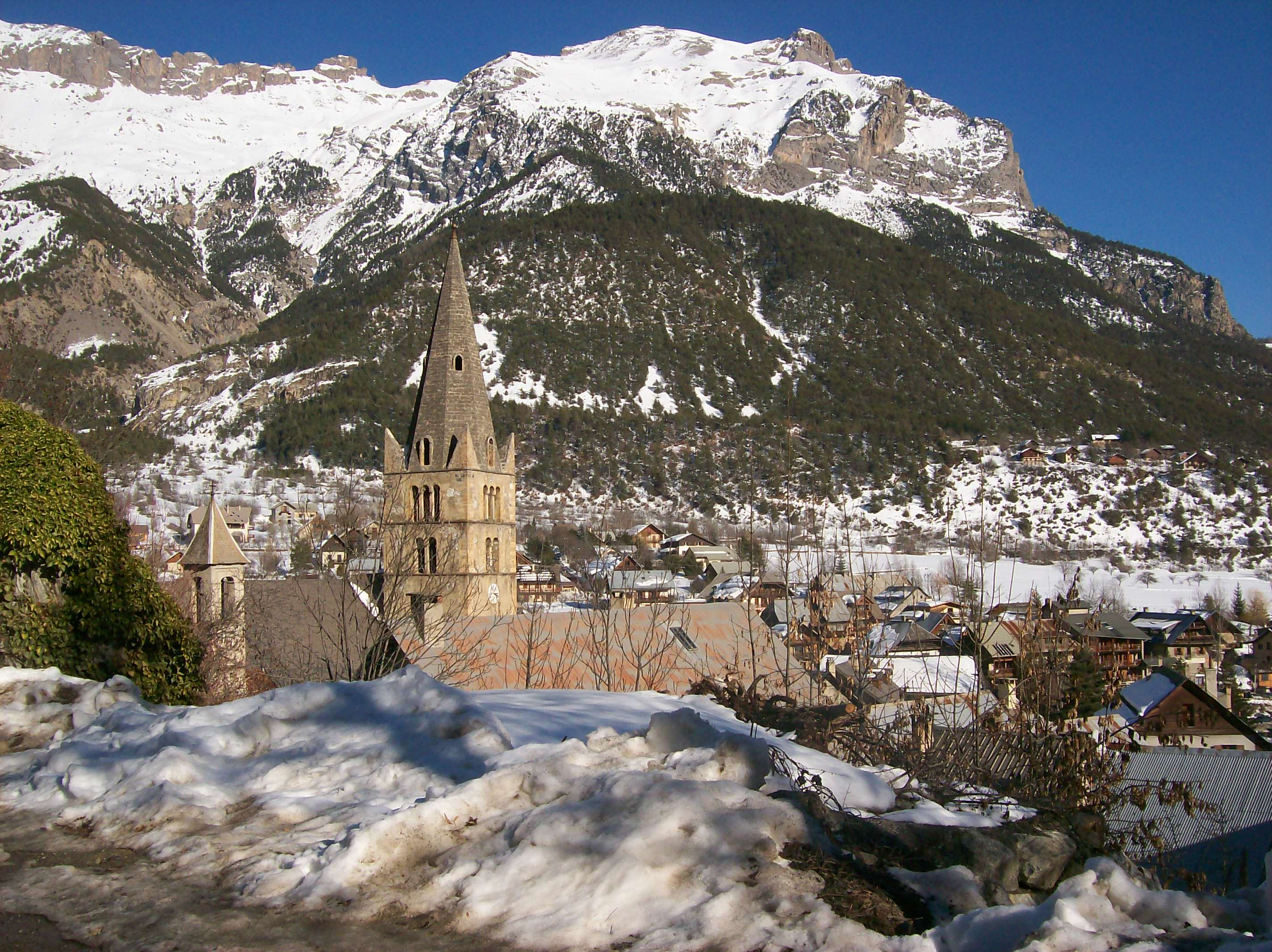
- The church and surrounding buildings in Vallouise, in winter

- Coat of arms
- Location of Vallouise
- Location within France Location within Provence-Alpes-Côte d'Azur
- Coordinates: 44°50′45″N 6°29′15″E
- Country: France
- Region: Provence-Alpes-Côte d'Azur
- Department: Hautes-Alpes
- Arrondissement: Briançon
- Canton: L'Argentière-la-Bessée
- Commune: Vallouise-Pelvoux
- Area^{1}: 68.58 km^{2} (26.48 sq mi)
- Elevation: 1,150 m (3,770 ft)
- Highest elevation: 3,667 m (12,031 ft)
- Lowest elevation: 1,106 m (3,629 ft)
- Population (2018): 748
  - Density: 10.9/km^{2} (28.2/sq mi)
- Time zone: UTC+01:00 (CET)
  - Summer (DST): UTC+02:00 (CEST)
- Postal code: 05290
- ^{1} French Land Register data, which excludes lakes, ponds, glaciers > 1 km^{2} (0.386 sq mi or 247 acres) and river estuaries.

Vallouise (French pronunciation: [valwiz]; Vivaro-Alpine: Vau Loïsa) is a former commune in the Hautes-Alpes department in southeastern France. On 1 January 2017, it was merged into the new commune Vallouise-Pelvoux.

== Population ==
Historical population
Year	Pop.	±% p.a.
1962	381	—
1968	417	+1.52%
1975	451	+1.13%
1982	512	+1.83%
1990	623	+2.48%
1999	637	+0.25%
2018	748	+0.85%
Source: EHESS and INSEE

== See also ==
- Communes of the Hautes-Alpes department
