= Villar-Saint-Pancrace =

- Commune
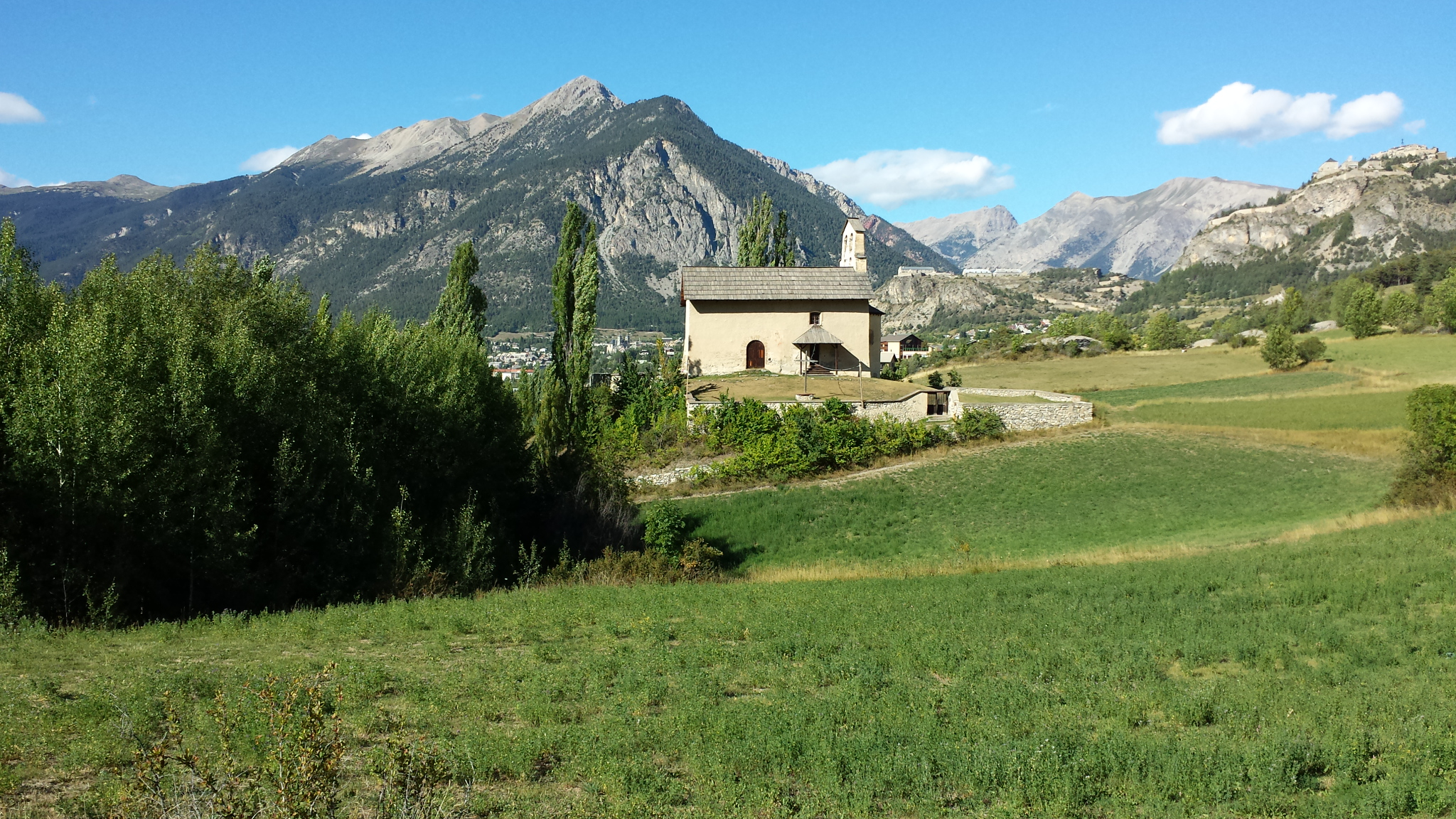
- The chapel of Saint-Pancrace, in Villar-Saint-Pancrace
- Location of Villar-Saint-Pancrace
- Location within France Location within Provence-Alpes-Côte d'Azur
- Coordinates: 44°52′25″N 6°37′40″E
- Country: France
- Region: Provence-Alpes-Côte d'Azur
- Department: Hautes-Alpes
- Arrondissement: Briançon
- Canton: Briançon-1
- Intercommunality: Briançonnais

Government
  - Mayor (2026–32): Sébastien Fine
- Area^{1}: 42.53 km^{2} (16.42 sq mi)
- Elevation: 1,260 m (4,130 ft)
- Highest elevation: 2,903 m (9,524 ft)
- Lowest elevation: 1,160 m (3,810 ft)
- Population (2023): 1,433
  - Density: 33.69/km^{2} (87.27/sq mi)
- Time zone: UTC+01:00 (CET)
  - Summer (DST): UTC+02:00 (CEST)
- INSEE/Postal code: 05183 /05100
- ^{1} French Land Register data, which excludes lakes, ponds, glaciers > 1 km^{2} (0.386 sq mi or 247 acres) and river estuaries.

Villar-Saint-Pancrace (French pronunciation: [vilaʁ sɛ̃ pɑ̃kʁas], also known as Grand Villar or le Villar; Occitan: Lo Vialar e Sant Prancaci) is a commune in the Hautes-Alpes department in southeastern France.

== Population ==
Historical population
Year	Pop.	±% p.a.
1968	960	—
1975	1,023	+0.91%
1982	1,117	+1.26%
1990	1,287	+1.79%
1999	1,410	+1.02%
2007	1,461	+0.45%
2012	1,446	−0.21%
2017	1,472	+0.36%
2023	1,433	−0.45%
Source: INSEE

== See also ==
- Communes of the Hautes-Alpes department
