= Freissinières =

- Commune
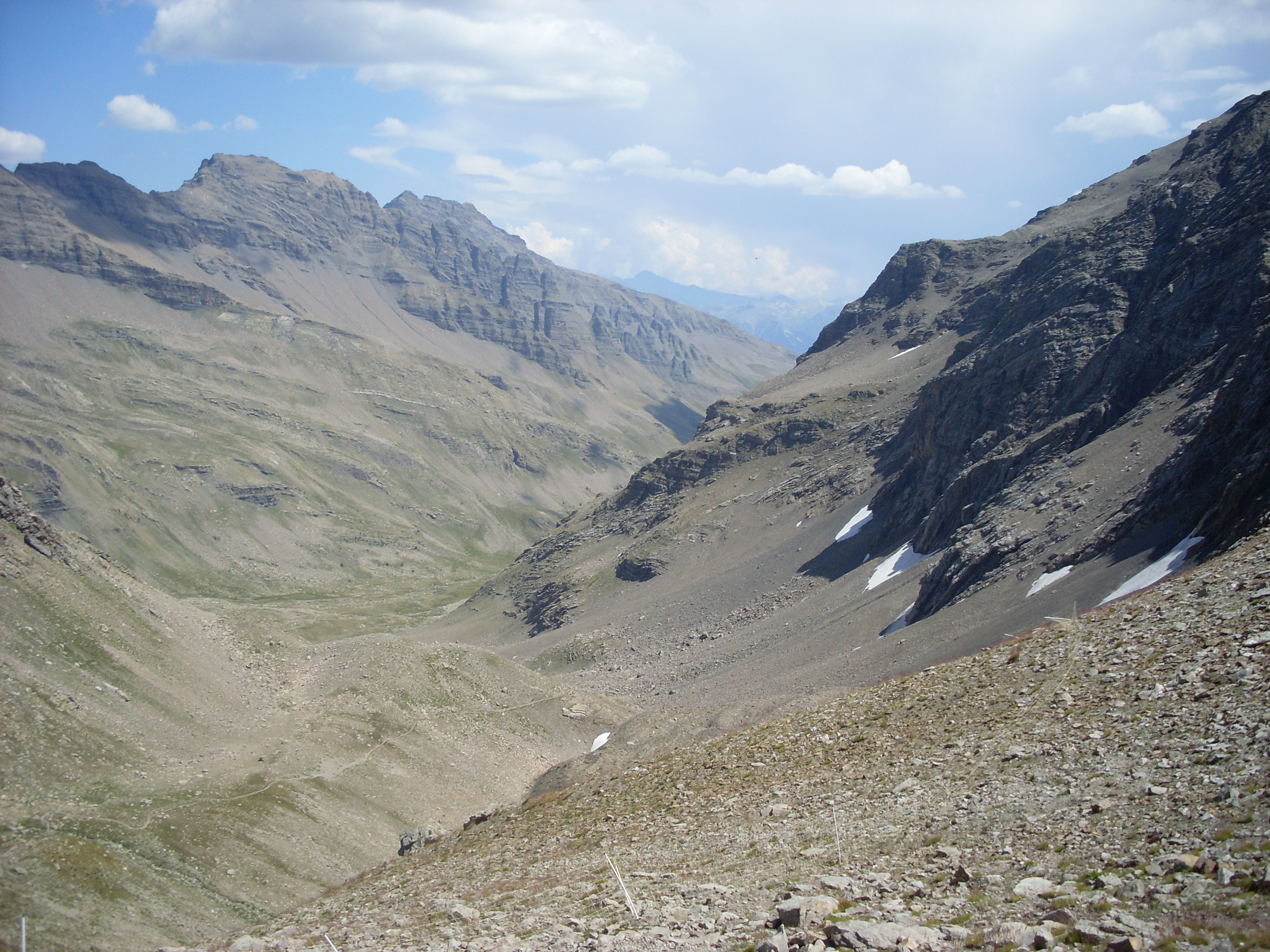
- Valley of Chichin
- Location of Freissinières
- Location within France Location within Provence-Alpes-Côte d'Azur
- Coordinates: 44°45′18″N 6°32′16″E
- Country: France
- Region: Provence-Alpes-Côte d'Azur
- Department: Hautes-Alpes
- Arrondissement: Briançon
- Canton: L'Argentière-la-Bessée
- Intercommunality: Pays des Écrins

Government
  - Mayor (2026–32): Cyrille Drujon d'Astros
- Area^{1}: 88.21 km^{2} (34.06 sq mi)
- Elevation: 1,190 m (3,900 ft)
- Highest elevation: 3,236 m (10,617 ft)
- Lowest elevation: 936 m (3,071 ft)
- Population (2023): 186
  - Density: 2.11/km^{2} (5.46/sq mi)
- Time zone: UTC+01:00 (CET)
  - Summer (DST): UTC+02:00 (CEST)
- INSEE/Postal code: 05058 /05310
- ^{1} French Land Register data, which excludes lakes, ponds, glaciers > 1 km^{2} (0.386 sq mi or 247 acres) and river estuaries.

Freissinières (French pronunciation: [fʁɛsinjɛʁ]; Occitan: Fraissiniera) is a commune in the Hautes-Alpes department in southeastern France.

== Geography ==
Freissinières lies in a valley which is the watershed of the Biaysse, which flows into the Durance in front of La Roche-de-Rame.

From east to west, it consists of an alluvial plain of about 80 hectares, bordered on the south by a forest of conifers. On the north, the terrain is arid and rocky. However, vineyards were planted there up to 1200 m.

Near the hamlet of Meyries, the valley widens to the north, with a deciduous forest. The part of the valley called la Poua, exposed to the south, was well cultivated up to the pastures near the col d'Anon.

After the hamlet of Ribes, chief settlement of the commune, the valley narrows along the course of the Biaysse. Here, the soil is poor; avalanches and mudslides have covered the soil with rocks and gravel. The two little hamlets of Viollins and Mensals are situated in rare protected spots.

Then, the Biaysse is formed by the junction of two rivers : from north, the Chichin torrent cascading down from the hamlet of Dormillouse at 1727 m, and from south the river les Oules coming from the lakes of Fangeas, Faravel and Palluel. This sector is dominated by the peaks of Félix Neff (3243 m), Grand Pinier (3117 m), and Petit Pinier (3100 m), which are part of the Parc national des Écrins. South of the hamlet of Viollins, the beautiful mountain of Val-Haute is dominated by the Tête de Vautisse (3156 m).

In 2010 in the Parc National des Ecrins, Freissinières, a high altitude rock shelter with prehistoric rock paintings of animals was discovered.

== Population ==
Historical population
Year	Pop.	±% p.a.
1968	216	—
1975	199	−1.16%
1982	172	−2.06%
1990	167	−0.37%
1999	169	+0.13%
2007	183	+1.00%
2012	203	+2.10%
2017	210	+0.68%
2023	186	−2.00%
Source: INSEE

== See also ==
- Communes of the Hautes-Alpes department
