= Puy-Saint-André =

- Commune
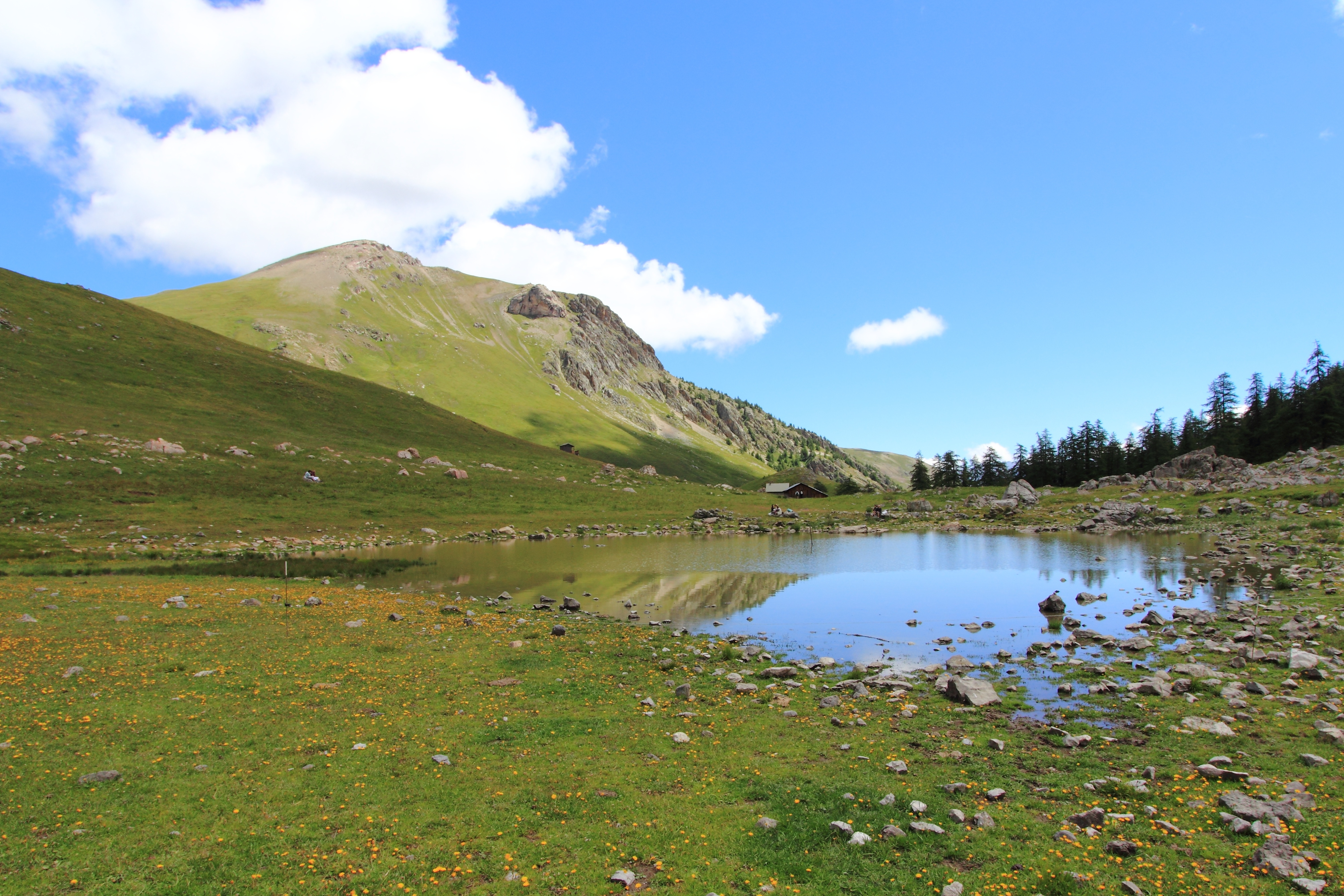

- Coat of arms
- Location of Puy-Saint-André
- Location within France Location within Provence-Alpes-Côte d'Azur
- Coordinates: 44°52′47″N 6°35′57″E
- Country: France
- Region: Provence-Alpes-Côte d'Azur
- Department: Hautes-Alpes
- Arrondissement: Briançon
- Canton: Briançon-1
- Intercommunality: Briançonnais

Government
  - Mayor (2026–32): Olivier Rey
- Area^{1}: 15.37 km^{2} (5.93 sq mi)
- Elevation: 1,430 m (4,690 ft)
- Highest elevation: 2,923 m (9,590 ft)
- Lowest elevation: 1,159 m (3,802 ft)
- Population (2023): 476
  - Density: 31.0/km^{2} (80.2/sq mi)
- Time zone: UTC+01:00 (CET)
  - Summer (DST): UTC+02:00 (CEST)
- INSEE/Postal code: 05107 /05100
- ^{1} French Land Register data, which excludes lakes, ponds, glaciers > 1 km^{2} (0.386 sq mi or 247 acres) and river estuaries.

Puy-Saint-André (French pronunciation: [pɥi sɛ̃.t‿ɑ̃dʁe]; Occitan: Puei Sant Andreu) is a commune in the Hautes-Alpes department in southeastern France.

== Population ==
Historical population
Year	Pop.	±% p.a.
1968	89	—
1975	64	−4.60%
1982	197	+17.42%
1990	287	+4.82%
1999	462	+5.43%
2007	464	+0.05%
2012	467	+0.13%
2017	462	−0.22%
2023	476	+0.50%
Source: INSEE

== See also ==
- Communes of the Hautes-Alpes department
