= Puy-Saint-Pierre =

- Commune
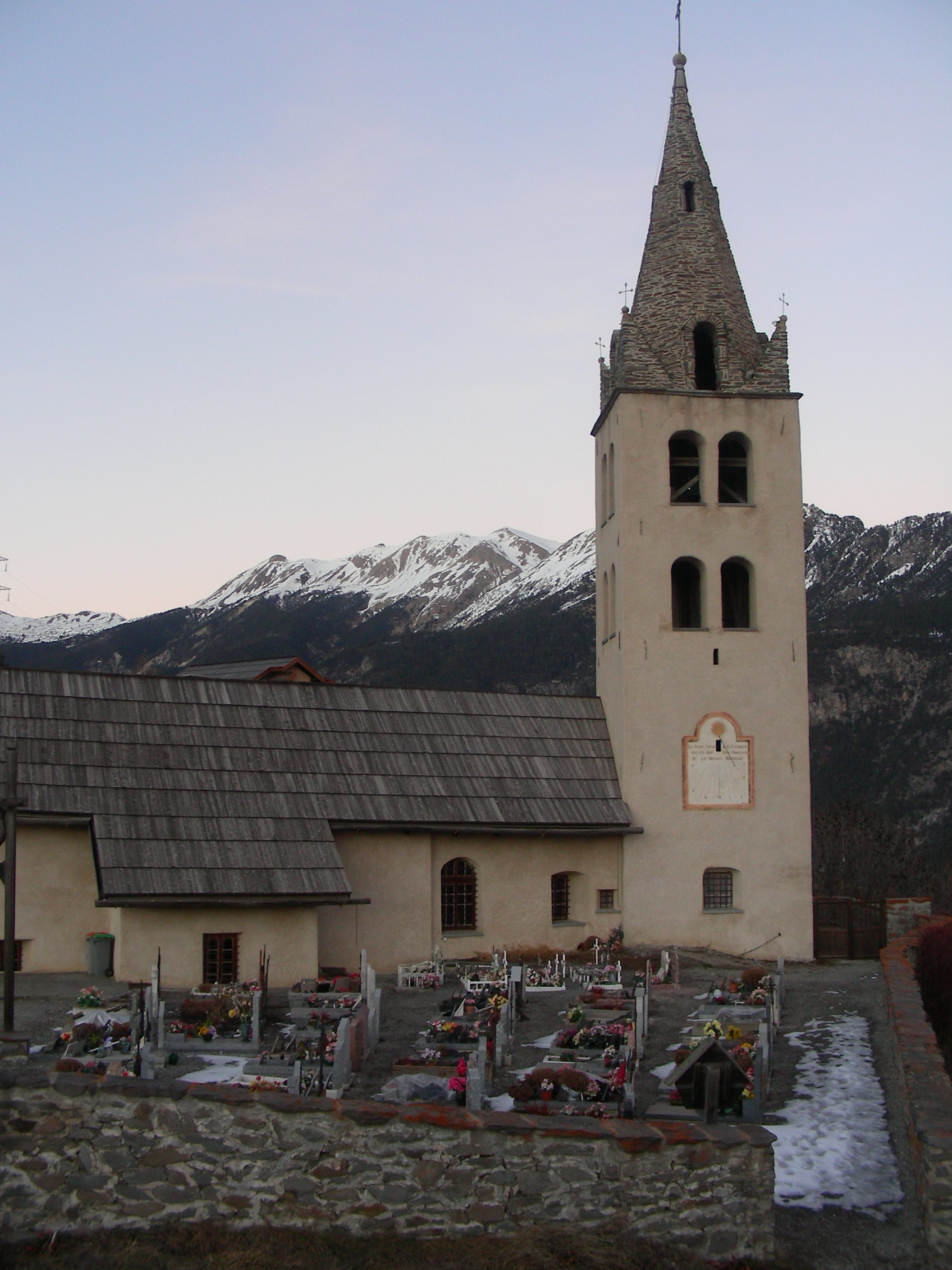
- The church of Puy-Saint-Pierre, in early 2007

- Coat of arms
- Location of Puy-Saint-Pierre
- Location within France Location within Provence-Alpes-Côte d'Azur
- Coordinates: 44°53′38″N 6°37′07″E
- Country: France
- Region: Provence-Alpes-Côte d'Azur
- Department: Hautes-Alpes
- Arrondissement: Briançon
- Canton: Briançon-1

Government
  - Mayor (2026–32): Vincent Faubert
- Area^{1}: 7.74 km^{2} (2.99 sq mi)
- Elevation: 1,024 m (3,360 ft)
- Highest elevation: 2,538 m (8,327 ft)
- Lowest elevation: 1,237 m (4,058 ft)
- Population (2023): 518
  - Density: 66.9/km^{2} (173/sq mi)
- Time zone: UTC+01:00 (CET)
  - Summer (DST): UTC+02:00 (CEST)
- INSEE/Postal code: 05109 /05100
- ^{1} French Land Register data, which excludes lakes, ponds, glaciers > 1 km^{2} (0.386 sq mi or 247 acres) and river estuaries.

Puy-Saint-Pierre (French pronunciation: [pɥi sɛ̃ pjɛʁ]; Occitan: Le Puei Sant Peire) is a commune in the Hautes-Alpes department in southeastern France.

== Population ==
Historical population
Year	Pop.	±% p.a.
1968	229	—
1975	254	+1.49%
1982	307	+2.74%
1990	344	+1.43%
1999	354	+0.32%
2007	496	+4.31%
2012	505	+0.36%
2017	538	+1.27%
2023	518	−0.63%
Source: INSEE

== See also ==
- Communes of the Hautes-Alpes department
