= Saint-Martin-de-Queyrières =

- Commune
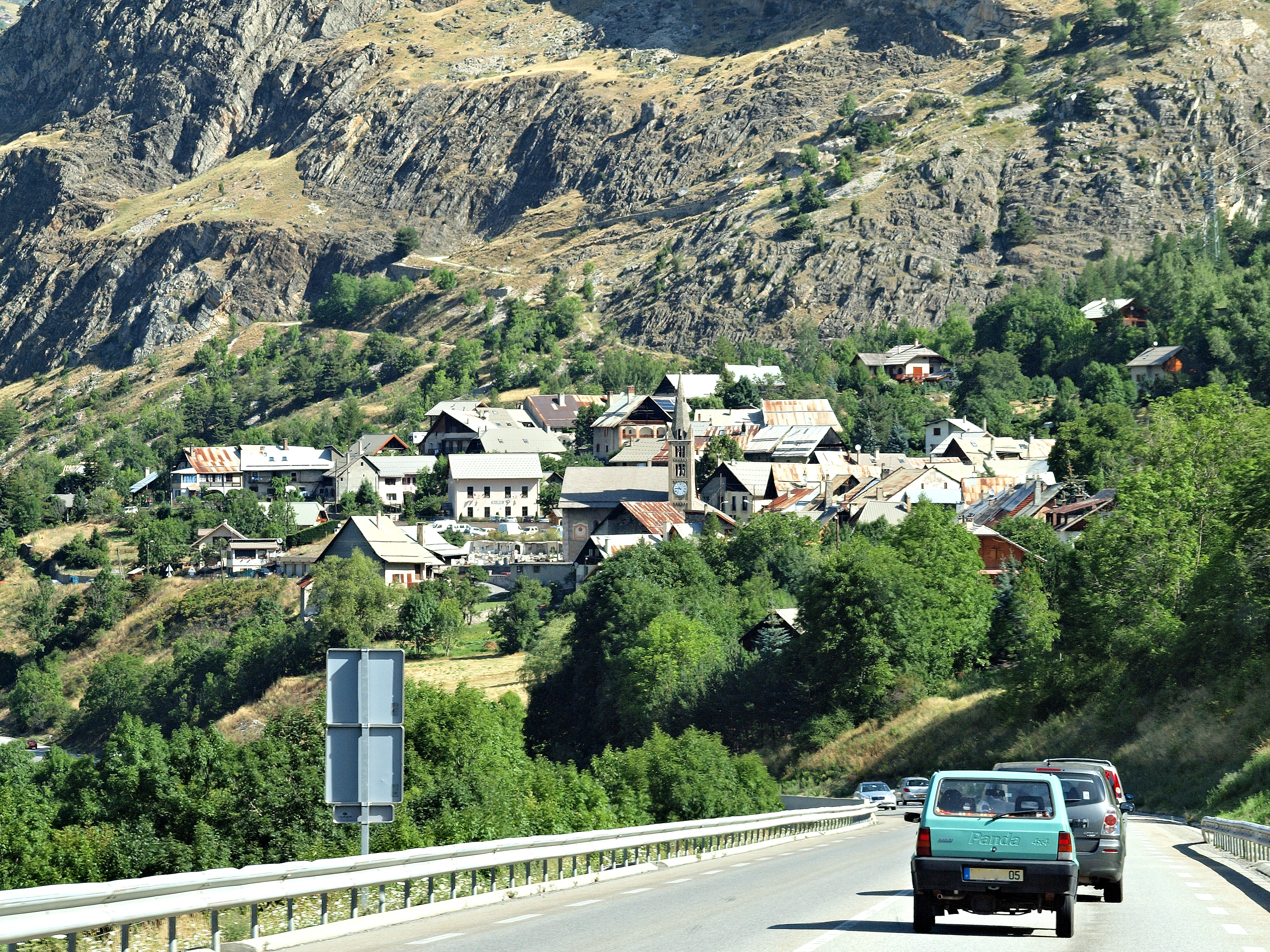
- Saint-Martin-de-Queyrières seen from the RN94 road

- Coat of arms
- Location of Saint-Martin-de-Queyrières
- Location within France Location within Provence-Alpes-Côte d'Azur
- Coordinates: 44°50′28″N 6°35′10″E
- Country: France
- Region: Provence-Alpes-Côte d'Azur
- Department: Hautes-Alpes
- Arrondissement: Briançon
- Canton: L'Argentière-la-Bessée
- Intercommunality: Pays des Écrins

Government
  - Mayor (2026–32): Serge Giordano
- Area^{1}: 55.52 km^{2} (21.44 sq mi)
- Elevation: 1,200 m (3,900 ft)
- Highest elevation: 2,920 m (9,580 ft)
- Lowest elevation: 1,000 m (3,300 ft)
- Population (2023): 1,114
  - Density: 20.06/km^{2} (51.97/sq mi)
- Time zone: UTC+01:00 (CET)
  - Summer (DST): UTC+02:00 (CEST)
- INSEE/Postal code: 05151 /05120
- ^{1} French Land Register data, which excludes lakes, ponds, glaciers > 1 km^{2} (0.386 sq mi or 247 acres) and river estuaries.

Saint-Martin-de-Queyrières (French pronunciation: [sɛ̃ maʁtɛ̃ də kɛʁjɛʁ]; Occitan: Sant Martin de Cairiera) is a commune in the Hautes-Alpes department in southeastern France.

== Population ==
Historical population
Year	Pop.	±% p.a.
1968	485	—
1975	449	−1.10%
1982	524	+2.23%
1990	707	+3.82%
1999	936	+3.17%
2007	1,110	+2.15%
2012	1,065	−0.82%
2017	1,130	+1.19%
2023	1,114	−0.24%
Source: INSEE

== See also ==
- Communes of the Hautes-Alpes department
