= La Roche-de-Rame =

- Commune
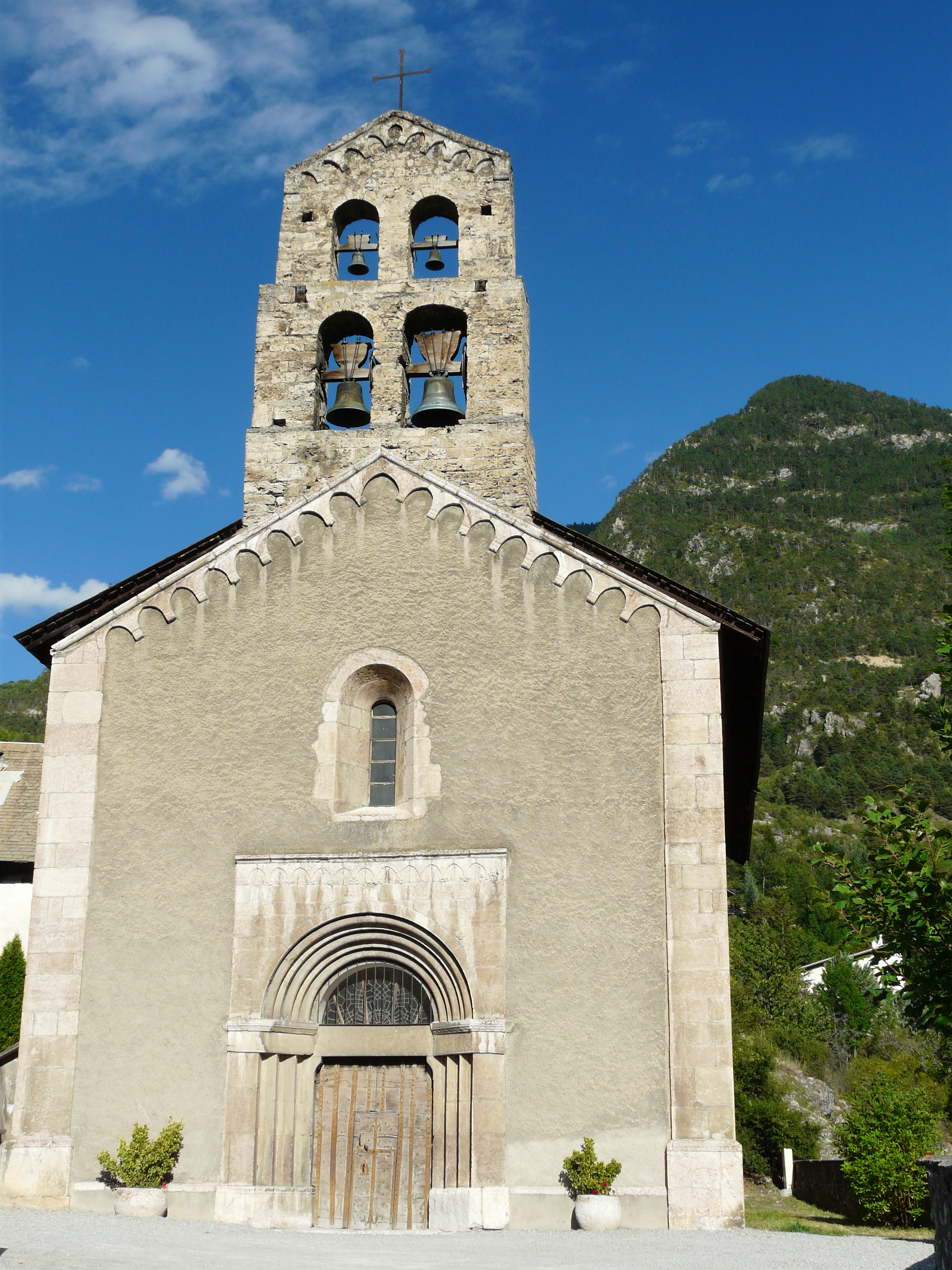
- The church of Saint-Laurent in La Roche-de-Rame

- Coat of arms
- Location of La Roche-de-Rame
- Location within France Location within Provence-Alpes-Côte d'Azur
- Coordinates: 44°45′02″N 6°34′52″E
- Country: France
- Region: Provence-Alpes-Côte d'Azur
- Department: Hautes-Alpes
- Arrondissement: Briançon
- Canton: L'Argentière-la-Bessée
- Intercommunality: Pays des Écrins

Government
  - Mayor (2026–32): Michel Frison
- Area^{1}: 40.53 km^{2} (15.65 sq mi)
- Elevation: 946 m (3,104 ft)
- Highest elevation: 2,808 m (9,213 ft)
- Lowest elevation: 910 m (2,990 ft)
- Population (2023): 904
  - Density: 22.3/km^{2} (57.8/sq mi)
- Time zone: UTC+01:00 (CET)
  - Summer (DST): UTC+02:00 (CEST)
- INSEE/Postal code: 05122 /05310
- ^{1} French Land Register data, which excludes lakes, ponds, glaciers > 1 km^{2} (0.386 sq mi or 247 acres) and river estuaries.

La Roche-de-Rame (French pronunciation: [la ʁɔʃ də ʁam]; Occitan: La Ròcha de Rama) is a commune in the Hautes-Alpes department in southeastern France.

== Population ==
Historical population
Year	Pop.	±% p.a.
1968	601	—
1975	653	+1.19%
1982	726	+1.53%
1990	702	−0.42%
1999	678	−0.39%
2007	805	+2.17%
2012	848	+1.05%
2017	824	−0.57%
2023	904	+1.56%
Source: INSEE

== See also ==
- Communes of the Hautes-Alpes department
