= Canton of Briançon-1 =

Coordinates: 44.90°N 6.63°E

The canton of Briançon-1 is an administrative division of the Hautes-Alpes department, in southeastern France. It was created at the French canton reorganisation which came into effect in March 2015. Its seat is in Briançon.

It consists of the following communes:

1. Briançon (partly)
2. Cervières
3. La Grave
4. Le Monêtier-les-Bains
5. Puy-Saint-André
6. Puy-Saint-Pierre
7. Saint-Chaffrey
8. La Salle-les-Alpes
9. Villar-d'Arêne
10. Villar-Saint-Pancrace
