= Saint-Chaffrey =

Saint-Chaffrey Sant Chafrei (Occitan)
- Commune
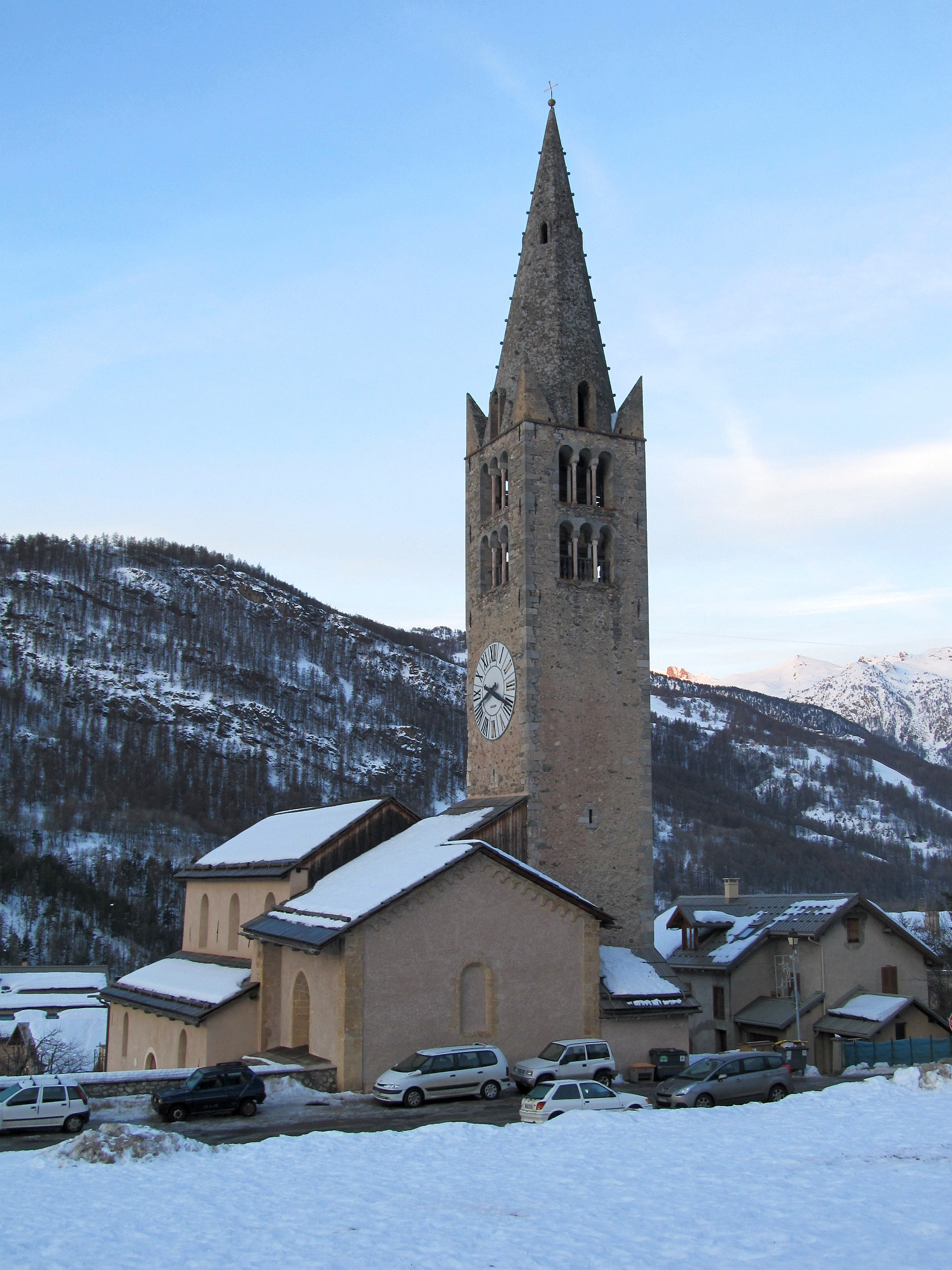
- Parish church of Saint-Chaffrey

- Coat of arms
- Location of Saint-Chaffrey
- Location within France Location within Provence-Alpes-Côte d'Azur
- Coordinates: 44°55′37″N 6°36′27″E
- Country: France
- Region: Provence-Alpes-Côte d'Azur
- Department: Hautes-Alpes
- Arrondissement: Briançon
- Canton: Briançon-1
- Intercommunality: Briançonnais

Government
  - Mayor (2026–32): Thierry Faure
- Area^{1}: 25.88 km^{2} (9.99 sq mi)
- Elevation: 1,365 m (4,478 ft)
- Highest elevation: 2,632 m (8,635 ft)
- Lowest elevation: 1,274 m (4,180 ft)
- Population (2023): 1,494
  - Density: 57.73/km^{2} (149.5/sq mi)
- Demonym: Chaffrelins
- Time zone: UTC+01:00 (CET)
  - Summer (DST): UTC+02:00 (CEST)
- INSEE/Postal code: 05133 /05330
- Website: www.saint-chaffrey.fr
- ^{1} French Land Register data, which excludes lakes, ponds, glaciers > 1 km^{2} (0.386 sq mi or 247 acres) and river estuaries.

Saint-Chaffrey (French pronunciation: [sɛ̃ ʃafʁɛ]; Occitan: Sant Chafrei) is an alpine commune in the Hautes-Alpes department in the Provence-Alpes-Côte d'Azur region in Southeastern France. Saint-Chaffrey is located in the Valley of the Guisane, on the road to Grenoble, between La Salle-les-Alpes to the northwest and Briançon to the southeast.

== Geography ==
The commune of Saint-Chaffrey encompasses the villages of Saint-Chaffrey, Chantemerle, Villard-Laté and La Gérarde. It is situated at the heart of the Serre Chevalier ski resort, which has slopes that serve Chantemerle.

== Demographics ==
Historical population
Year	Pop.	±% p.a.
1968	831	—
1975	947	+1.88%
1982	1,287	+4.48%
1990	1,424	+1.27%
1999	1,569	+1.08%
2007	1,689	+0.93%
2012	1,663	−0.31%
2017	1,604	−0.72%
2023	1,494	−1.18%
Source: INSEE

== Tour de France ==
Several stages of the Tour de France have started or finished in the commune of Saint-Chaffrey:

Finishes

Year	Stage	Departure town	Winner
1974	11	Aix-les-Bains	Vicente López Carril
1975	16	Barcelonnette	Bernard Thévenet
1986	17	Gap	Eduardo Chozas
1993	10	Villard-de-Lans	Tony Rominger

Starts

Year	Stage	Finish town	Winner
1980	17	Morzine	Mario Martinez
1993	11	Isola 2000	Tony Rominger

== Gallery ==
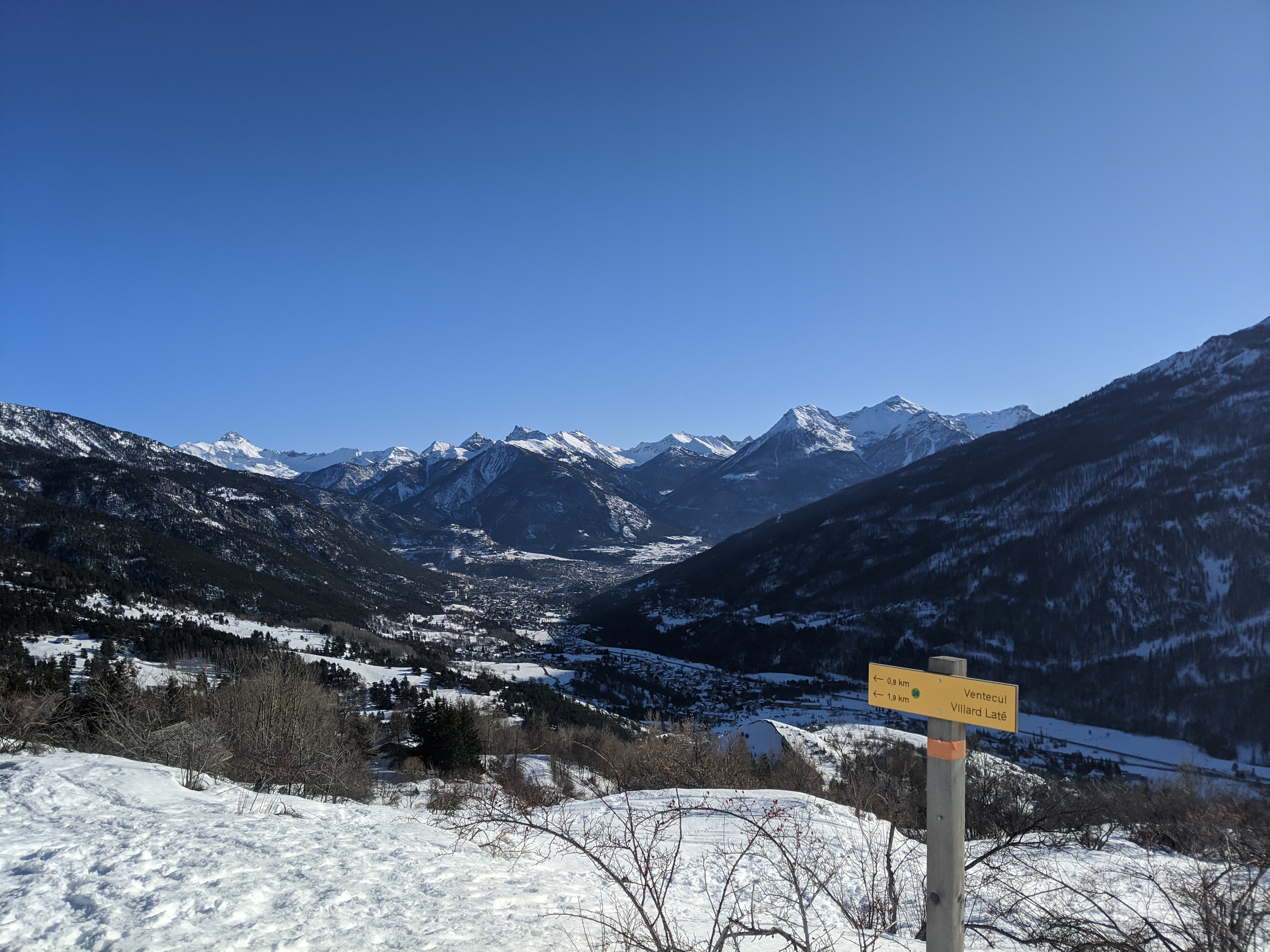
Overlooking the valley at Saint-Chaffrey and Briançon from high up on the Col du Granon in winter

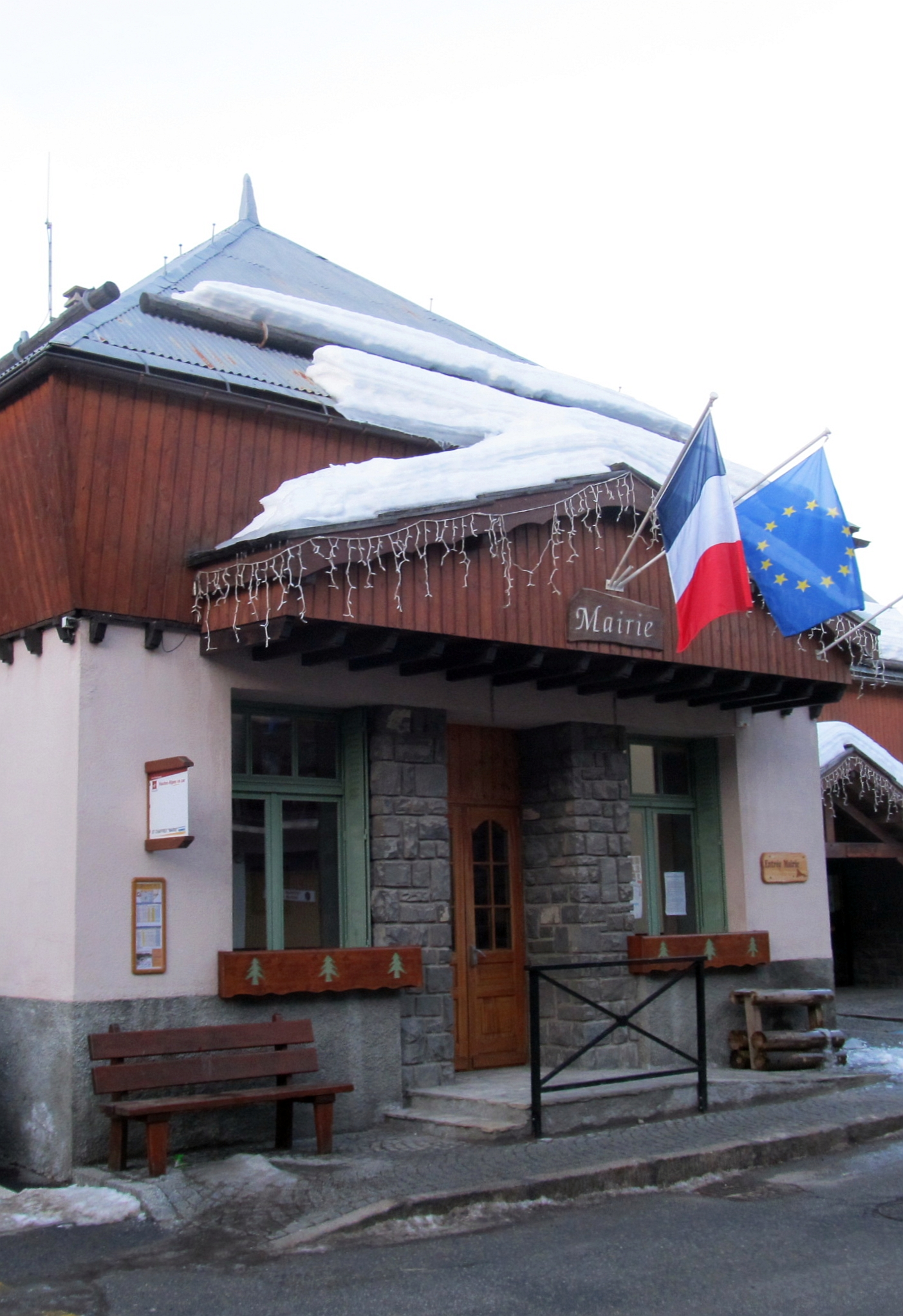
Saint-Chaffrey Town Hall

== See also ==
- Communes of the Hautes-Alpes department
