= Guisane =

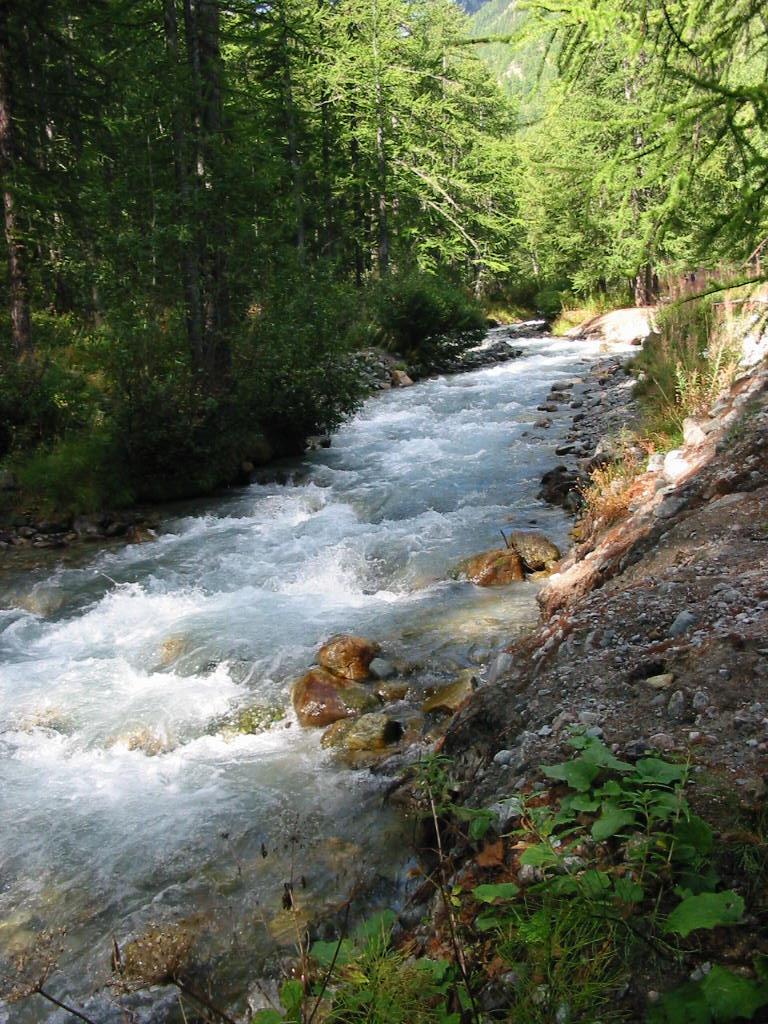
- The Guisane in Le Monêtier-les-Bains

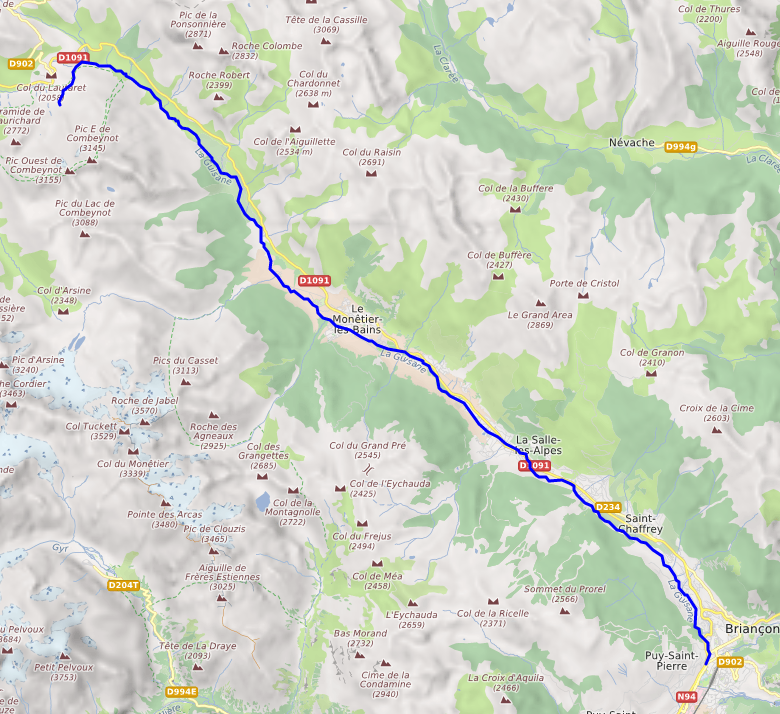
- Map of the Guisane

Location
- Country: France

Physical characteristics
- Source
  - location: Le Monêtier-les-Bains
  - coordinates: 45°01′40″N 06°24′27″E
  - elevation: 2,105 m (6,906 ft)
- Mouth
  - location: Durance
  - coordinates: 44°53′34″N 06°37′47″E
  - elevation: 1,185 m (3,888 ft)
- Length: 27.7 km (17.2 mi)
- Basin size: 200 km^{2} (77 sq mi)
- Discharge
  - average: 5.19 m^{3}/s (183 cu ft/s)

Basin features
- Progression: Durance→ Rhône→ Mediterranean Sea

The Guisane is a river in the Hautes-Alpes department, Provence-Alpes-Côte d'Azur region of France, a subtributary of the Rhône and tributary of the Durance (in Briançon). It takes its source in Le Monêtier-les-Bains at the Col du Lautaret. It is 27.7 km (17.2 mi) long. Its drainage basin is 200 km^{2} (77 sq mi). It has an average discharge of 5.19 m^{3}/s (183 cu ft/s) in Saint-Chaffrey.
