= Château-Ville-Vieille =

Château-Ville-Vieille Chastèu e Vilavielha (Occitan)
- Commune
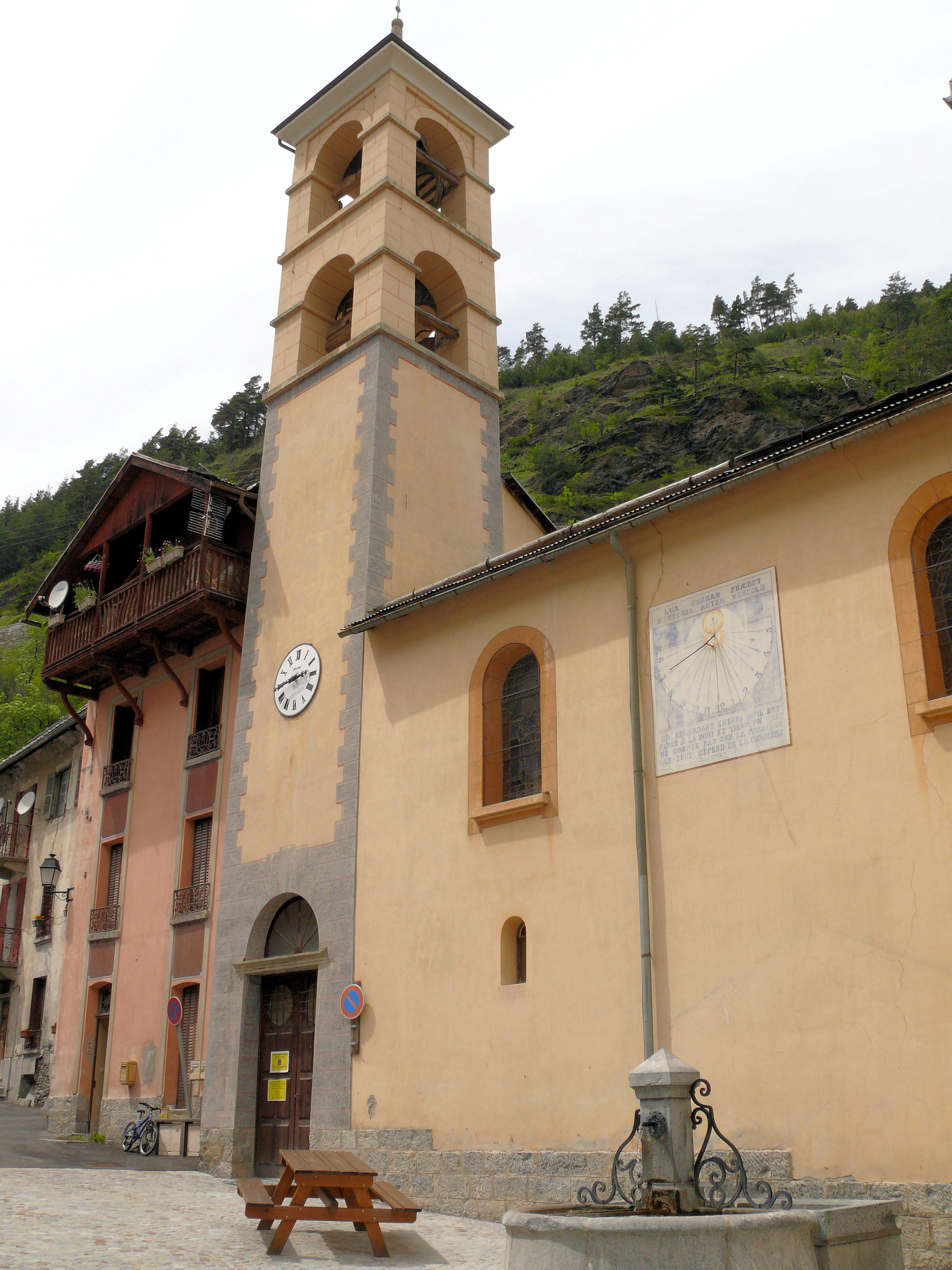
- Chateau of Queyras

- Coat of arms
- Location of Château-Ville-Vieille
- Location within France Location within Provence-Alpes-Côte d'Azur
- Coordinates: 44°45′27″N 6°47′30″E
- Country: France
- Region: Provence-Alpes-Côte d'Azur
- Department: Hautes-Alpes
- Arrondissement: Briançon
- Canton: Guillestre

Government
  - Mayor (2026–32): Jean-Louis Poncet
- Area^{1}: 66.9 km^{2} (25.8 sq mi)
- Elevation: 1,360 m (4,460 ft)
- Highest elevation: 3,280 m (10,760 ft)
- Lowest elevation: 1,229 m (4,032 ft)
- Population (2023): 298
  - Density: 4.45/km^{2} (11.5/sq mi)
- Time zone: UTC+01:00 (CET)
  - Summer (DST): UTC+02:00 (CEST)
- INSEE/Postal code: 05038 /05350
- ^{1} French Land Register data, which excludes lakes, ponds, glaciers > 1 km^{2} (0.386 sq mi or 247 acres) and river estuaries.

Château-Ville-Vieille (French: [ʃɑto vil vjɛj]; Vivaro-Alpine: Chastèu e Vilavielha) is a commune in the Hautes-Alpes department in southeastern France.

== Geography ==
The commune is located in the Queyras.

The two villages in the commune lie in the Guil valley; Ville-Vieille on the left bank of the Guil and Château-Queyras on its right bank.

== Population ==
Historical population
Year	Pop.	±% p.a.
1968	304	—
1975	283	−1.02%
1982	268	−0.77%
1990	271	+0.14%
1999	321	+1.90%
2007	323	+0.08%
2012	339	+0.97%
2017	345	+0.35%
2023	298	−2.41%
Source: INSEE

== See also ==
- Communes of the Hautes-Alpes department
