= La Salle-les-Alpes =

La Salle-les-Alpes La Sala los Aups (Occitan)
- Commune
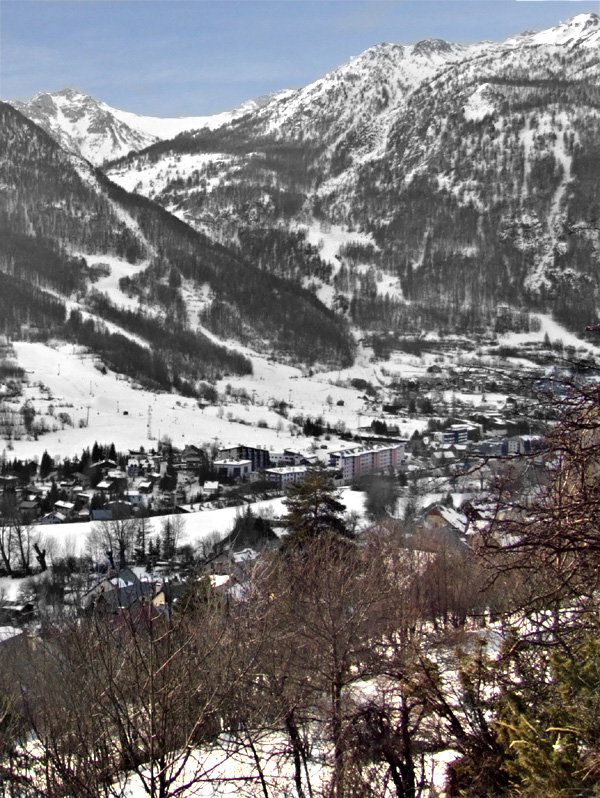
- A view of La Salle-les-Alpes, with the slopes of the ski area of Serre Chevalier

- Coat of arms
- Location of La Salle-les-Alpes
- Location within France Location within Provence-Alpes-Côte d'Azur
- Coordinates: 44°56′45″N 6°34′18″E
- Country: France
- Region: Provence-Alpes-Côte d'Azur
- Department: Hautes-Alpes
- Arrondissement: Briançon
- Canton: Briançon-1
- Intercommunality: Briançonnais

Government
  - Mayor (2026–32): Émeric Salle
- Area^{1}: 35.42 km^{2} (13.68 sq mi)
- Elevation: 1,397 m (4,583 ft)
- Highest elevation: 2,845 m (9,334 ft)
- Lowest elevation: 1,356 m (4,449 ft)
- Population (2023): 892
  - Density: 25.2/km^{2} (65.2/sq mi)
- Time zone: UTC+01:00 (CET)
  - Summer (DST): UTC+02:00 (CEST)
- INSEE/Postal code: 05161 /05240
- ^{1} French Land Register data, which excludes lakes, ponds, glaciers > 1 km^{2} (0.386 sq mi or 247 acres) and river estuaries.

La Salle-les-Alpes (French pronunciation: [la sal lez‿alp]; Occitan: La Sala los Aups or simply La Sala, before 1987: La Salle) is a commune in the Hautes-Alpes department in the Provence-Alpes-Côte d'Azur region in Southeastern France.

== Geography ==
The commune of La Salle-les-Alpes forms part of the Serre Chevalier ski resort in the Valley of the Guisane alongside Briançon, Saint-Chaffrey and Le Monêtier-les-Bains. It encompasses the villages and hamlets of La Salle, Villeneuve, Le Bez, Les Pananches and Moulin-Baron. As it is situated on the 45th parallel north, it is equidistant of the North Pole and Equator.

== Demographics ==
Historical population
Year	Pop.	±% p.a.
1968	701	—
1975	791	+1.74%
1982	1,009	+3.54%
1990	981	−0.35%
1999	976	−0.06%
2007	901	−0.99%
2012	932	+0.68%
2017	982	+1.05%
2023	892	−1.59%
Source: INSEE

== See also ==
- Communes of the Hautes-Alpes department
