= Canton of L'Argentière-la-Bessée =

Coordinates: 44°47′43″N 6°33′36″E

L'Argentière-la-Bessée
- Canton
- Country: France
- Region: Provence-Alpes-Côte d'Azur
- Department: Hautes-Alpes
- No. of communes: {{{nbcomm}}}
- Area: 462.84 km^{2} (178.70 sq mi)
- Population (2023): 6,591
  - Density: 14.24/km^{2} (36.88/sq mi)
- INSEE code: 05 01

The canton of L'Argentière-la-Bessée is an administrative division in southeastern France. It includes the following communes:

- L'Argentière-la-Bessée
- Champcella
- Freissinières
- Puy-Saint-Vincent
- La Roche-de-Rame
- Saint-Martin-de-Queyrières
- Vallouise-Pelvoux
- Les Vigneaux

== Demographics ==
Historical population
| Year | Pop. | ±% p.a. |
|---|---|---|
| 2013 | 6,637 | — |
| 2018 | 6,623 | −0.04% |
Source: INSEE

== See also ==
- Cantons of the Hautes-Alpes department
