= Le Monêtier-les-Bains =

- Commune
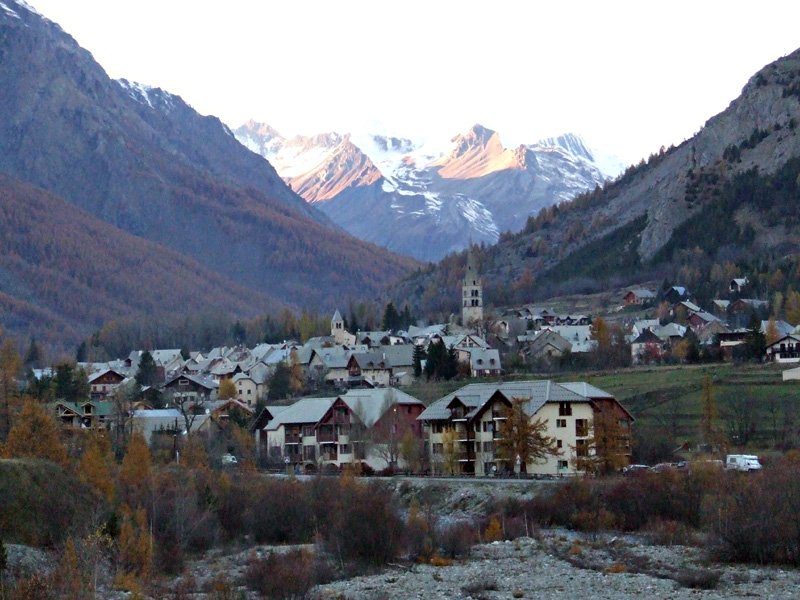
- Le Monêtier-les-Bains

- Coat of arms
- Location of Le Monêtier-les-Bains
- Location within France Location within Provence-Alpes-Côte d'Azur
- Coordinates: 44°58′37″N 6°30′34″E
- Country: France
- Region: Provence-Alpes-Côte d'Azur
- Department: Hautes-Alpes
- Arrondissement: Briançon
- Canton: Briançon-1
- Intercommunality: Briançonnais

Government
  - Mayor (2026–32): Jean-Marie Rey
- Area^{1}: 97.87 km^{2} (37.79 sq mi)
- Elevation: 1,495 m (4,905 ft)
- Highest elevation: 3,659 m (12,005 ft)
- Lowest elevation: 1,397 m (4,583 ft)
- Population (2023): 923
  - Density: 9.43/km^{2} (24.4/sq mi)
- Time zone: UTC+01:00 (CET)
  - Summer (DST): UTC+02:00 (CEST)
- INSEE/Postal code: 05079 /05220
- ^{1} French Land Register data, which excludes lakes, ponds, glaciers > 1 km^{2} (0.386 sq mi or 247 acres) and river estuaries.

Le Monêtier-les-Bains (French pronunciation: [lə mɔnɛtje le bɛ̃]; Occitan: Lo Monastièr) is a commune in the Hautes-Alpes department in southeastern France.

== Geography ==
Le Monêtier-les-Bains is the highest village of the French ski resort of Serre Chevalier at 1,500m. It is situated in the Guisane Valley. Le Monêtier-Les-Bains has two hot-water springs, one at 34 °C (93 °F) and one at 38 °C (100 °F), and the village has been a thermal spa since Roman times. The village is on the periphery of the Ecrins National Park.

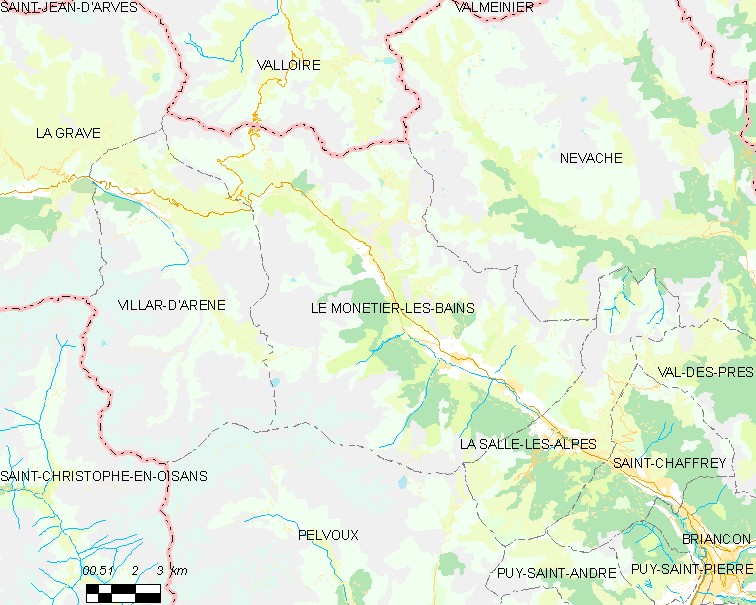
A map of the commune

=== Climate ===
Le Monêtier-les-Bains has a humid continental climate (Köppen climate classification Dfb). The average annual temperature in Le Monêtier-les-Bains is 6.3 °C (43.3 °F). The average annual rainfall is 855.7 mm (33.69 in) with October as the wettest month. The temperatures are highest on average in July, at around 15.9 °C (60.6 °F), and lowest in January, at around −2.7 °C (27.1 °F). The highest temperature ever recorded in Le Monêtier-les-Bains was 34.0 °C (93.2 °F) on 3 August 1947; the coldest temperature ever recorded was −25.0 °C (−13.0 °F) on 10 January 1945.

Climate data for Le Monêtier-les-Bains (1991–2020 averages, extremes 1935−present)
Month	Jan	Feb	Mar	Apr	May	Jun	Jul	Aug	Sep	Oct	Nov	Dec	Year
Record high °C (°F)	15.0 (59.0)	16.2 (61.2)	22.5 (72.5)	28.0 (82.4)	28.7 (83.7)	33.7 (92.7)	34.0 (93.2)	34.0 (93.2)	31.8 (89.2)	27.0 (80.6)	20.9 (69.6)	17.0 (62.6)	34.0 (93.2)
Mean daily maximum °C (°F)	3.7 (38.7)	5.5 (41.9)	9.0 (48.2)	12.2 (54.0)	16.9 (62.4)	21.5 (70.7)	24.3 (75.7)	24.2 (75.6)	19.6 (67.3)	14.6 (58.3)	8.1 (46.6)	4.0 (39.2)	13.6 (56.6)
Daily mean °C (°F)	−2.6 (27.3)	−1.4 (29.5)	2.3 (36.1)	5.7 (42.3)	9.9 (49.8)	13.8 (56.8)	16.0 (60.8)	15.8 (60.4)	12.0 (53.6)	7.7 (45.9)	2.3 (36.1)	−1.7 (28.9)	6.7 (44.0)
Mean daily minimum °C (°F)	−8.9 (16.0)	−8.3 (17.1)	−4.3 (24.3)	−0.9 (30.4)	3.0 (37.4)	6.2 (43.2)	7.7 (45.9)	7.5 (45.5)	4.4 (39.9)	0.8 (33.4)	−3.6 (25.5)	−7.4 (18.7)	−0.3 (31.4)
Record low °C (°F)	−25.0 (−13.0)	−24.0 (−11.2)	−23.0 (−9.4)	−14.0 (6.8)	−13.0 (8.6)	−5.2 (22.6)	−4.5 (23.9)	−2.0 (28.4)	−5.5 (22.1)	−11.5 (11.3)	−20.0 (−4.0)	−24.5 (−12.1)	−25.0 (−13.0)
Average precipitation mm (inches)	69.8 (2.75)	50.5 (1.99)	58.2 (2.29)	58.7 (2.31)	74.1 (2.92)	67.4 (2.65)	56.3 (2.22)	55.6 (2.19)	73.4 (2.89)	104.8 (4.13)	106.8 (4.20)	85.1 (3.35)	860.7 (33.89)
Average precipitation days (≥ 1.0 mm)	7.4	5.9	6.6	7.6	9.8	9.1	7.6	7.8	7.2	8.7	8.7	8.3	94.8
Source: Meteociel

== Population ==
Historical population
Year	Pop.	±% p.a.
1968	806	—
1975	832	+0.45%
1982	970	+2.22%
1990	987	+0.22%
1999	1,009	+0.25%
2007	1,066	+0.69%
2012	1,011	−1.05%
2017	1,056	+0.87%
2023	923	−2.22%
Source: INSEE

== Skiing ==
Monetier's slopes are a part of the extensive Serre Chevalier ski area. There are 7 chairlifts and 4 drag lifts with the highest skiing in the domain at 2760m.

== Thermal baths ==
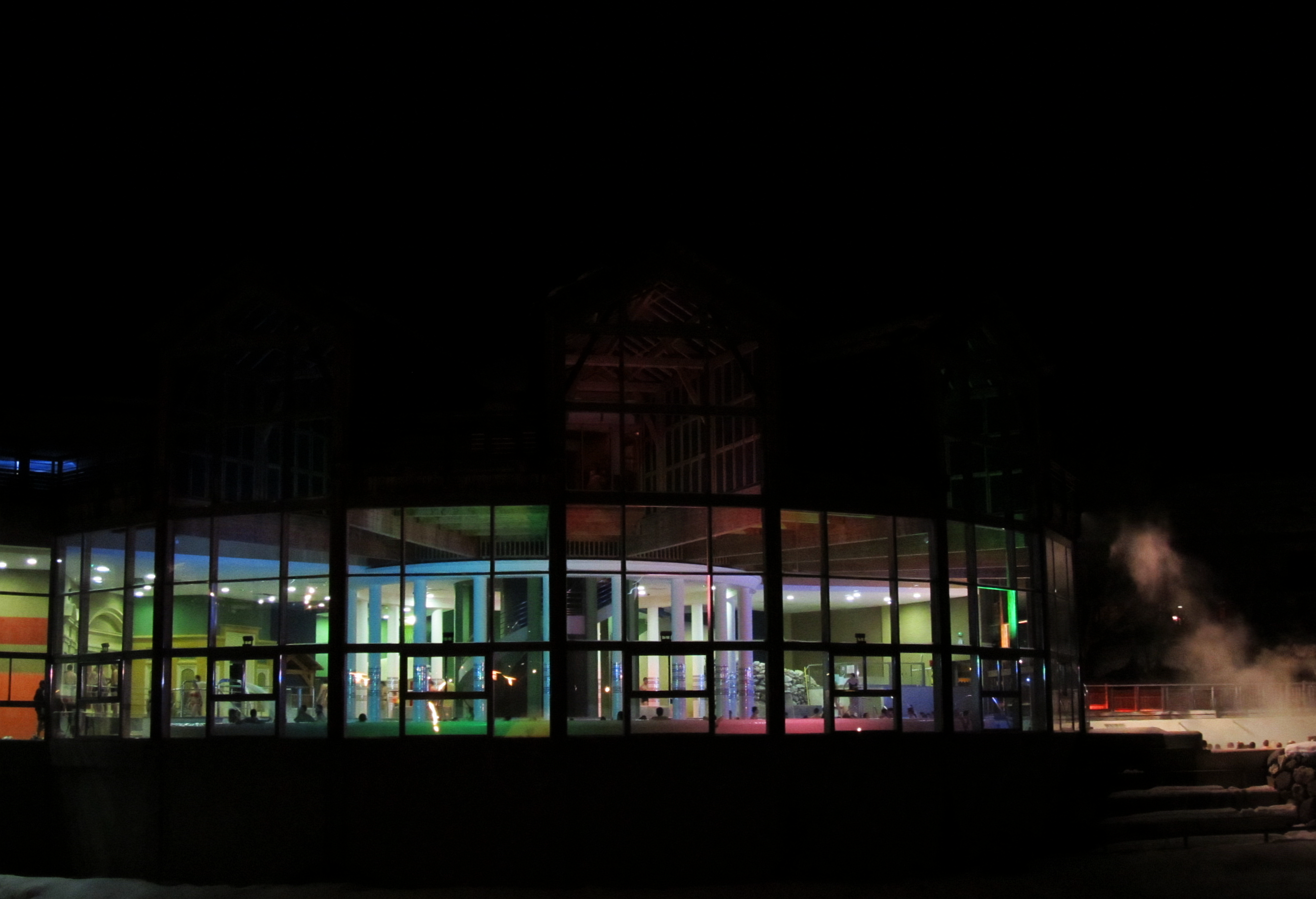
Les grands Bains in 2013

Warm water presence in the Monêtier area was already appreciated during the Roman Empire, when the village was known with the name of Stabatio (healing). Between 1715 and the late 19th century Monêtier was renowned for its thermal pools and facilities, which declined during the following century. From 1999 the new thermal bath of Les grands Bains was opened and, thanks to the following improvement works, Le Monêtier-les-Bains became, again, a popular destination for spa tourism.

== Tour de France ==
The village lies on the Col du Lautaret and is regularly used in the Tour de France. It has featured recently in the tours of 1996, 1999, 2000, 2003, 2005, 2007 and 2008. In the 2011 Tour it was also passed through with about 20 km to go on the 18th stage.

== See also ==
- Communes of the Hautes-Alpes department
