= Queyras Massif =

Massif in the Western Alps

Coordinates: 46°N 8°E

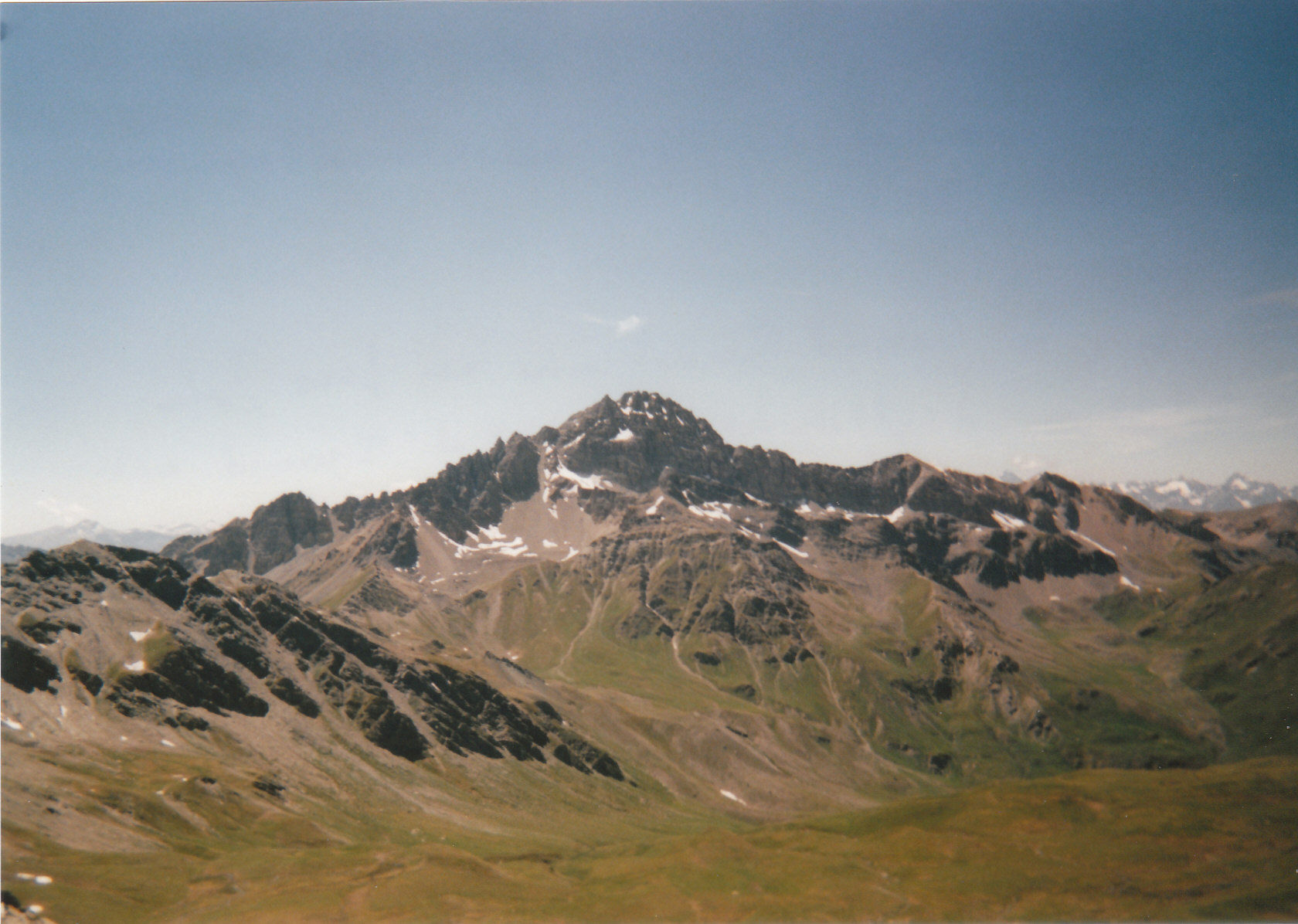
- Pic de Rochebrune

Highest point
- Elevation: 3,320 m (10,890 ft)
- Parent peak: Pic de Rochebrune

Naming
- Native name: Massif du Queyras (French)

Geography
- The massif is at the central part of the Western Alps, besides the Cottian Alps
- Country: France
- Department and Province: Hautes-Alpes; Province of Cuneo
- Region: Provence-Alpes-Côte d'Azur
- Parent range: Western Alps

Geology
- Rock type(s): Limestone, dolomite, gypsum, schist, ophiolite, gabbro, basalt

The Queyras Massif is a massif of the Alps located between the French department of Hautes-Alpes and the Italian region of Piedmont.

It hosts part of the Queyras regional natural park.

== Geography ==
=== Location ===
The Queyras corresponds to the basin of the Guil River, encompassing both banks. The massif itself is confined to the northern part of this region, specifically north of Château-Ville-Vieille, approximately along the right bank. It is bordered by Château-Ville-Vieille, Guillestre, and Briançon. The massif is surrounded by the Escreins massif to the south, the Écrins massif to the west, the Cerces massif to the north, and the Cottian Alps to the east.

=== Main peaks ===
- Pic de Rochebrune, 3,320 m (10,890 ft)
- Grand Glaiza, 3,293 m (10,804 ft)
- Cime de Chabrières, 3,246 m (10,650 ft)
- Cime de Clausis, 3,230 m (10,600 ft)
- Pic de Terre Noire, 3,100 m (10,200 ft)
- Pic de Foréant, 3,081 m (10,108 ft)
- Pic de Petit Rochebrune, 3,078 m (10,098 ft)
- Turge de la Suffie, 3,024 m (9,921 ft)
- Pic Traverse, 2,991 m (9,813 ft)
- Pic de Ségure, 2,990 m (9,810 ft)
- Pic Lombard, 2,975 m (9,760 ft)
- Pic de Clausis, 2,915 m (9,564 ft)
- Pic du Béal Traversier, 2,910 m (9,550 ft)

=== Geology ===
The Queyras Massif is divided into three geological zones. The western zone of the massif is sedimentary, consisting of limestone, dolomite, and gypsum. The center of the massif is made up of schist (calcschist), while the eastern zone is formed of ophiolites, gabbros, and basalts.
