= Cerveyrette =

River in the Hautes-Alpes, France; tributary of the Durance

Cerveyrette Ravin du Venton
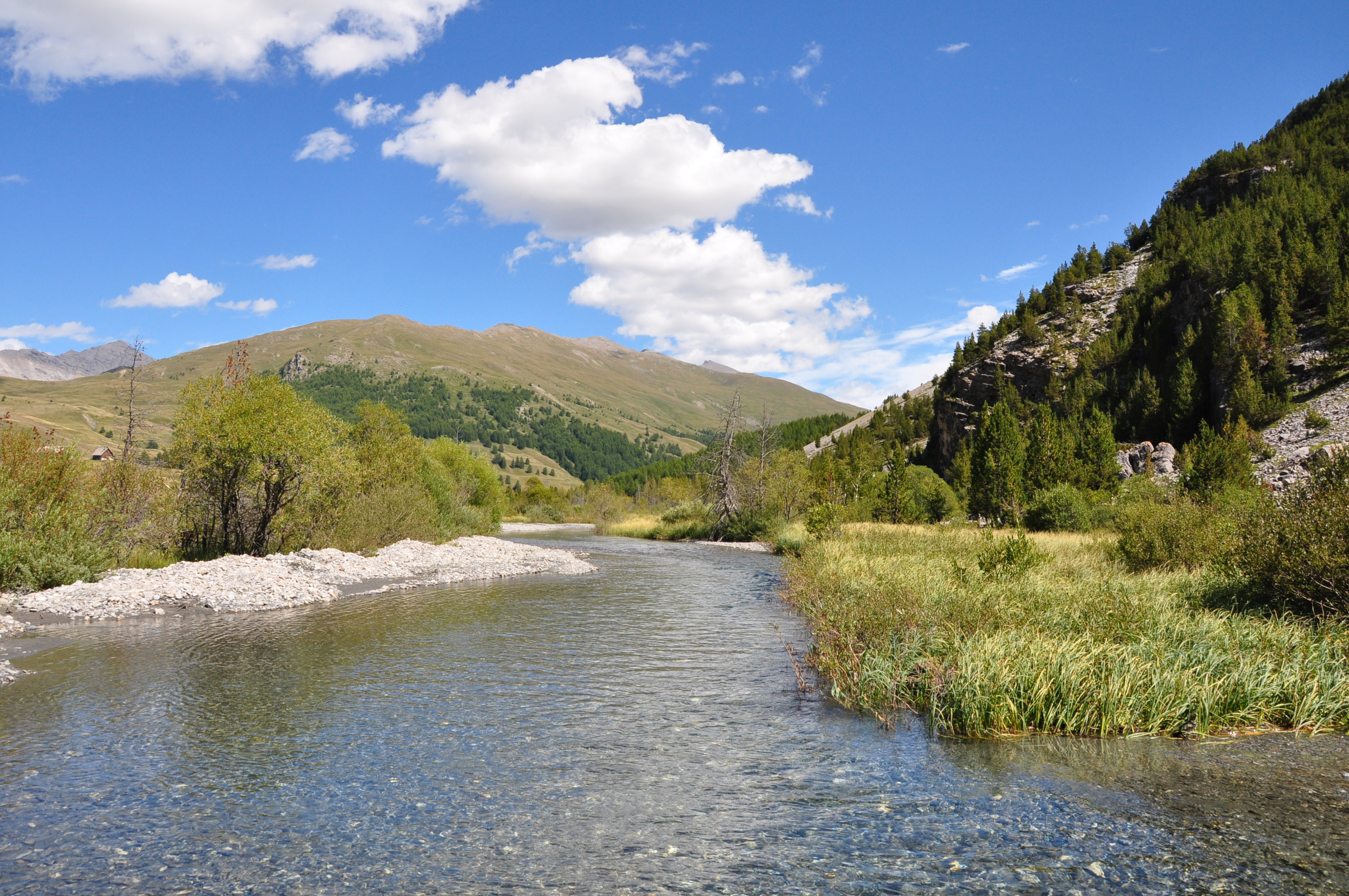
- The Cerveyrette at the marshy area known as the Plaine du Bourget, in the Vallée des Fonts of Cervières.

Location
- Country: France
- Region: Provence-Alpes-Côte d'Azur
- Department: Hautes-Alpes
- Arrondissement: Briançon
- Canton: Briançon-2

Physical characteristics
- Source: Le Venton
  - location: West of Petit Rochebrune, Cervières
  - coordinates: 44.8222°N 6.833°E
  - elevation: 2,506 m (8,222 ft)
- Mouth: Durance
  - location: Briançon
  - coordinates: 44.8867°N 6.6254°E
  - elevation: 1,187 m (3,894 ft)
- Length: 22.8 km (14.2 mi)
- Basin size: 119 km^{2} (46 sq mi)

Basin features
- River system: Rhône
- Tributaries
  - left: Blétonnet, Ruilles
  - right: Pierre Rouge, Villard
- Strahler number: 4
- Sources: SANDRE (X0100500), Géoportail, SMAVD

The Cerveyrette is a river in the Hautes-Alpes department of the Provence-Alpes-Côte d'Azur region in southeastern France. It is a tributary of the Durance, making it a sub-tributary of the Rhône.

== Geography ==
The Cerveyrette is both a torrent and the valley it has carved in its upper reaches (between 1,860 metres (6,100 ft) and 2,040 metres (6,690 ft) altitude) within the Queyras massif. One of its tributaries, the Blétonnet, collects water from the northern slopes of the Col d'Izoard. The upper valley contains one of the rare high-altitude wetlands in the region, at approximately 1,900 metres (6,200 ft), noted for its exceptional biological diversity.

The Cerveyrette originates in the commune of Cervières at a location called Le Venton, west of Petit Rochebrune (3,078 metres (10,098 ft)), at an altitude of 2,506 metres (8,222 ft). In its upper reaches, it is also known as the Ravin du Venton.

With a length of 22.8 kilometres (14.2 mi), the Cerveyrette is one of many Alpine tributaries contributing to the Rhône drainage basin.

The river joins the Durance on its left bank in Briançon, at an altitude of 1,187 metres (3,894 ft), less than 400 metres (1,300 ft) from the railway station and near the municipal swimming pool, at a location called Les Preyts.

Midway along its course, the Pont Baldy dam provides a storage capacity of up to 1,000,000 cubic metres (35,000,000 cu ft).

=== Communes and Cantons Traversed ===
The Cerveyrette flows through two communes in the Hautes-Alpes department and one canton:

- From upstream to downstream: Arrondissement of Briançon: Canton of Briançon-2: Cervières (source), Briançon (confluence).

=== Drainage Basin ===
The Cerveyrette drains a single hydrographic zone, "Torrent de la Cerveyrette" (X010), covering 119 square kilometres (46 sq mi). The basin consists of 96.44% forests and semi-natural areas, 2.99% agricultural land, 0.56% wetlands, and 0.56% urbanized areas.

=== Managing Authority ===
The river is managed by the Syndicat Mixte d’Aménagement de la Vallée de la Durance (SMAVD), which oversees the Durance Valley from Serre-Ponçon to the Rhône. The SMAVD manages the public fluvial domain of the Lower Durance and parts of the Middle Durance, focusing on flood management, safety improvements, sediment transport, natural heritage preservation, and balancing various uses of the river.

== Tributaries ==
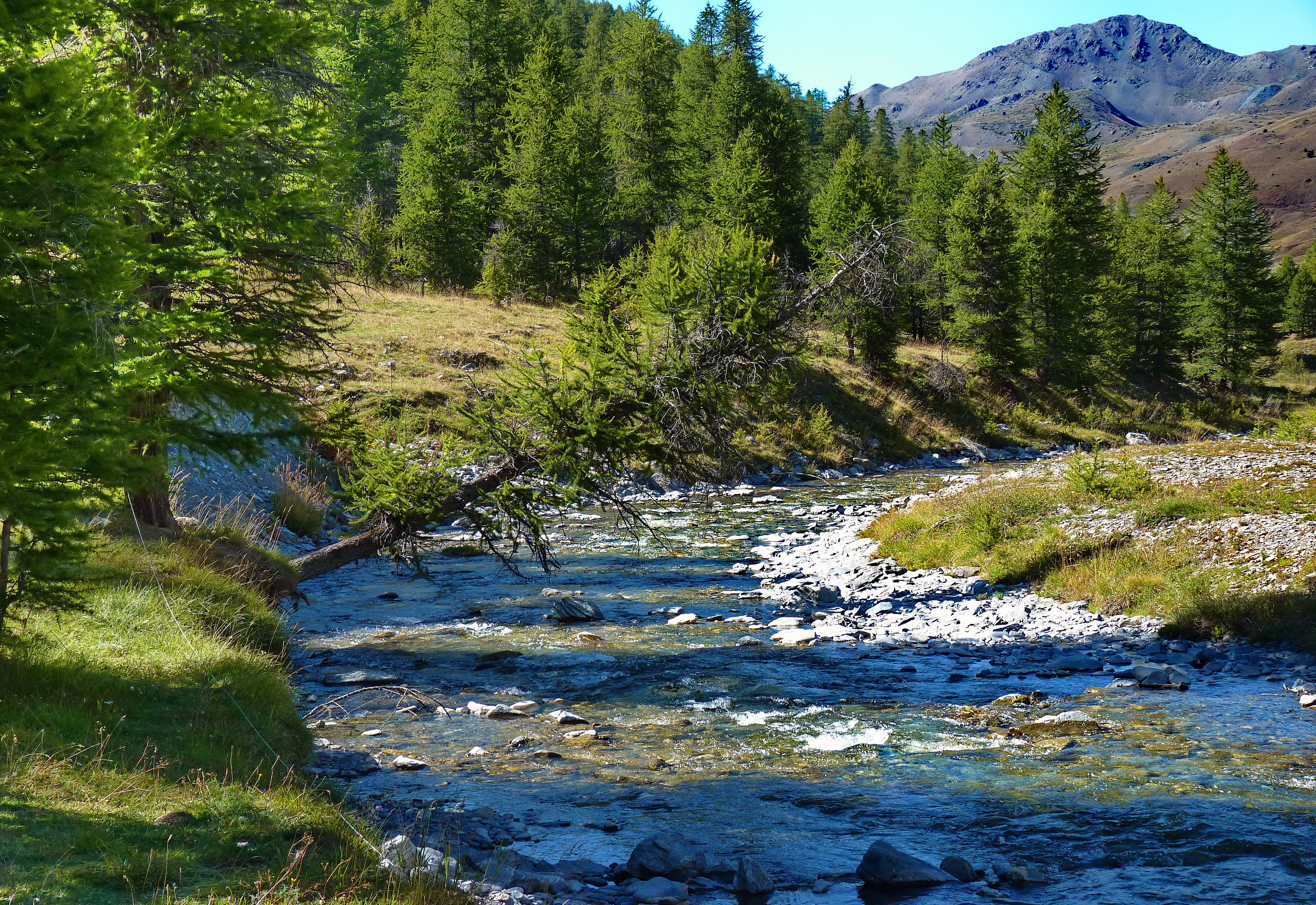
A weathered tree in Cervières

The Cerveyrette has fifteen referenced tributaries:

- Ravin des Chalmettes (left bank (Note: Left bank (rg) and right bank (rd) are relative to the river’s flow direction.)), 1.4 kilometres (0.87 mi), in Cervières.
- Ravin des Coutiers (left bank), 1.6 kilometres (0.99 mi), in Cervières.
- Torrent de Pierre Rouge (right bank), 6.1 kilometres (3.8 mi), in Cervières, below Grand Glaiza (3,293 metres (10,804 ft)).
- Ravin du Rousset (right bank), 2.6 kilometres (1.6 mi), in Cervières.
- Torrent de la Tirière (right bank), 2.8 kilometres (1.7 mi), in Cervières.
- Ravin de la Côte Belle (left bank), 2.1 kilometres (1.3 mi), in Cervières.
- Torrent de Saint-Claude (right bank), 2 kilometres (1.2 mi), in Cervières.
- Ruisseau de Cabot (right bank), 2.9 kilometres (1.8 mi), in Cervières, with one tributary:
  - Ruisseau de la Grande Combe (right bank), 1.3 kilometres (0.81 mi), in Cervières.
- Ravin de la Grande Combe (right bank), below Grand Charvia (2,648 metres (8,688 ft)), added by Géoportail.
- Ruisseau du Blétonnet (left bank), 6.5 kilometres (4.0 mi), in Cervières, with one tributary:
  - Ravin du Col d'Izoard (left bank), 4.3 kilometres (2.7 mi), in Cervières, with one tributary:
    - Ravin d'Izoard (left bank), 3.4 kilometres (2.1 mi), in Cervières, below Grand Peygu (2,796 metres (9,173 ft)).
- Torrent du Villard (right bank), 3.2 kilometres (2.0 mi), in Cervières.
- Ravin de l'Aigue Belle (right bank), 1.5 kilometres (0.93 mi), in Cervières.
- Ravin Mioillon (right bank), 2.7 kilometres (1.7 mi), in Cervières and Briançon.
- Ravin des Ruilles or Torrent de Chabrelle (left bank), 3.5 kilometres (2.2 mi), in Cervières, with one tributary:
  - Ravin de Comaire (right bank), 1.3 kilometres (0.81 mi), in Cervières.
- Ravin de la Grande Maye (left bank), 1.4 kilometres (0.87 mi), in Cervières, Villar-Saint-Pancrace, and Briançon.
- Ravin du Randon (right bank), 1.6 kilometres (0.99 mi), in Cervières and Briançon.

The Strahler number of the Cerveyrette is four, determined by the Blétonnet, Ravin du Col d'Izoard, and Ravin d'Izoard.

== Ecology ==
=== ZNIEFF ===
The Cerveyrette is part of a Type I ZNIEFF established in 1988, covering 999 hectares (2,470 acres) in Cervières: "ZNIEFF 930020391 - Haute Vallée de la Cerveyrette - Marais du Bourget - Bois du Rebanc - Bois du Bourget." This area features a unique complex of wetland habitats, including marshes, peat bogs, ponds, and tall sedge communities. The Marais du Bourget was significantly altered in the 1980s by a road construction that split the wetland into two hydrologically disconnected sections. A major dredging operation in the 1990s further lowered water levels in the northern part.

This Type I ZNIEFF is included within a larger Type II ZNIEFF, also established in 1988, covering 11,146 hectares (27,540 acres) across nine communes: "ZNIEFF 930012778 - Haute Cerveyrette and Blétonnet valleys - Upslope slopes of Grand Pic de Rochebrune."

=== Natura 2000 ===
The Cerveyrette is part of the Natura 2000 network, designated as a Special Area of Conservation (ZSC) since 2006 and a Site of Community Importance (SIC) since 2013, under reference "FR9301503 - Rochebrune - Izoard - Vallée de la Cerveyrette," covering 26,701 hectares (65,980 acres). This designation, established in 1998, recognizes the ecological significance of the valley’s habitats and biodiversity.

== Bibliography ==
- Vélasquez, Christian (1962). "La Cerveyrette" [The Cerveyrette]. The Geographical Journal (in French). 128 (3). Blackwell Publishing on behalf of The Royal Geographical Society (with the Institute of British Geographers): 340–341. JSTOR 1794061.
