= Pic de Petit Rochebrune =

Mountain in France

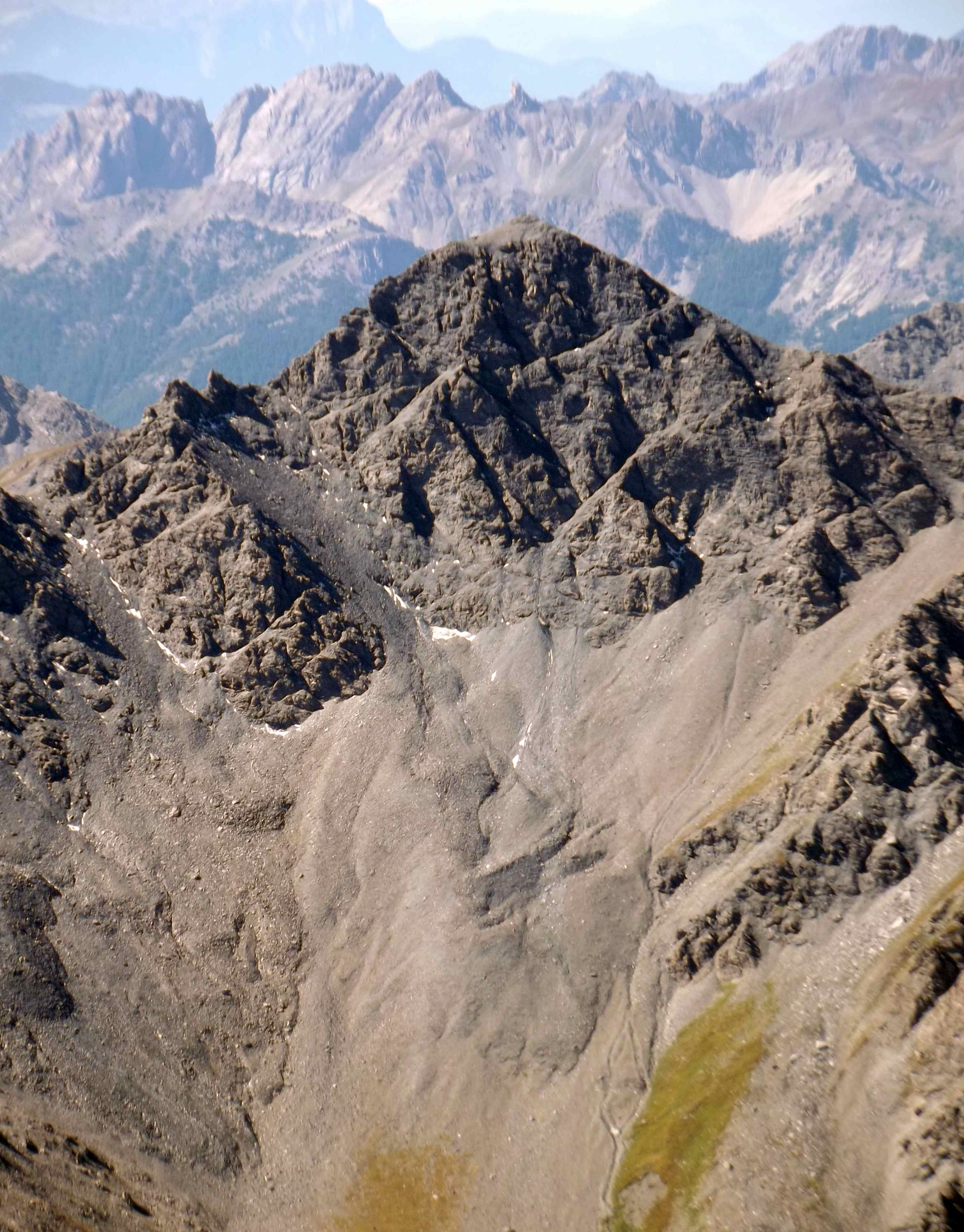
- Petit Rochebrune from Punta Merciantaira

Highest point
- Elevation: 3,078 m (10,098 ft)
- Prominence: 248 m (814 ft)
- Coordinates: 44°49′30″N 6°50′46″E

Geography
- Location within Alps
- Location: Provence-Alpes-Côte d'Azur, France
- Parent range: Cottian Alps

Climbing
- Easiest route: from le Fonts de Cervières

The Pic de Petit Rochebrune (or, simply, Petit Rochebrune; Occitan: Pica de Pichon Ròca Bruna) is a mountain in the Cottian Alps belonging to the French department of Hautes-Alpes.

== Etymology ==
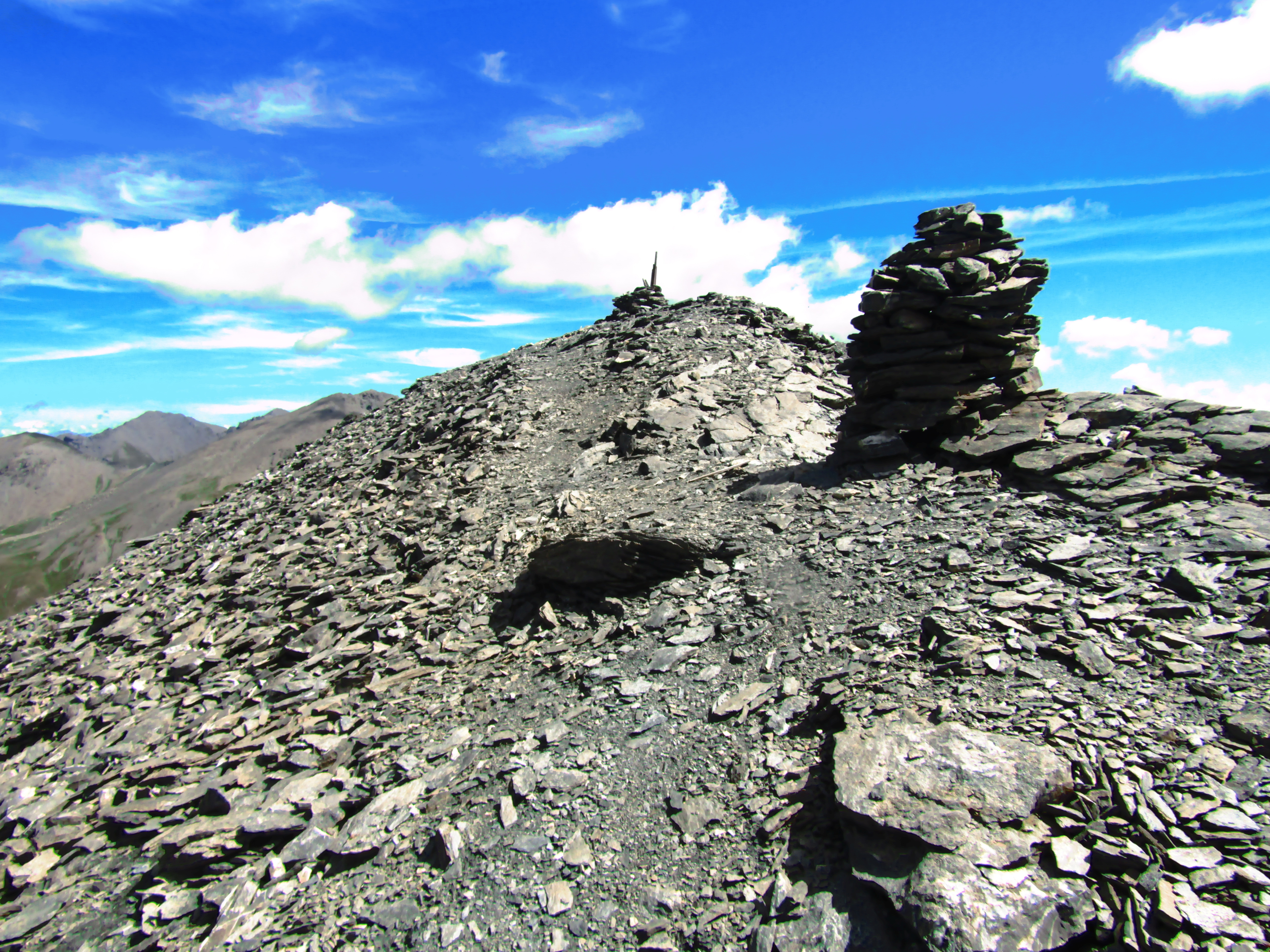
Summit cairns

The literal English translation of Pic de Rochebrune can be dark rock peak or brown rock peak. Petit means small, and refers to the fact that the mountain is smaller than the neighbouring Pic de Rochebrune.

== Geography ==
The mountain is located on the ridge dividing the Queyras (valley of the Guil, a tributary of the Durance) from the valley of the Cerveyrette, another tributary of the Durance. Administratively is shared bey the municipalities of Cervières and Aiguilles.

== Nature conservation ==
The Pic de Petit Rochebrune is located on the northern border of the regional nature park of Queyras (Parc naturel régional du Queyras ), established in 1977.

== Access to the summit ==
The easiest route to reach the summit starts from Les Fonts, a village of Cervières. The mountain is also a well known destination for winter ski mountaineering.

== Mountain huts ==
- Refuge Fonts de Cervières - 2040 m

== Maps ==
- French official cartography (Institut géographique national - IGN); on-line version: www.geoportail.fr
