= Massif d'Escreins =

Mountain range in France-Italy border

Escreins Massif
- Location within Provence-Alpes-Côte d'Azur Location within France

Highest point
- Elevation: 3,385 m (11,106 ft)
- Parent peak: Pics de la Font Sancte
- Coordinates: 44°35′42″N 6°46′47″E

Naming
- Native name: Massif d'Escriens (French)

Geography
- Countries: France; Italy
- Departments and province: Hautes-Alpes; Alpes-de-Haute-Provence; Cuneo
- Regions: Provence-Alpes-Côte d'Azur; Piedmont

Geology
- Rock type: Sedimentary rocks

The Escreins Massif (French: Massif d'Escreins; Occitan: Massís Escreins) is a massif in the French and Italian Alps located in the French departments of Hautes-Alpes and Alpes-de-Haute-Provence, as well as in the Italian region of Piedmont.

It is home to part of the Queyras regional natural park.

== Geography ==
=== Location ===
The Escreins Massif is located between the valleys of Queyras to the north and Ubaye to the south. It is surrounded by Embrun, Guillestre, Saint-Véran and Barcelonnette.

To the north is the Queyras Massif, to the east the Cottian Alps, to the southeast the Chambeyron Massif, and to the southwest the Parpaillon Massif.

=== Main summits ===
- Pics de la Font Sancte, 3,385 m
- Mont Aiguillette, 3,287 m
- Pic des Heuvières, 3,272 m
- Panestrel, 3,254 m
- Pic des Houerts, 3,236 m
- Péouvou, 3,232 m
- Pain de Sucre, 3,208 m
- Tête des Toillies, 3,175 m
- Mortice, 3,169 m
- Tête de Longet, 3,151 m
- Grand Queyras, 3,114 m
- Rocher de l'Échasse, 3,049 m
- Pointe d'Escreins, 3,042 m
- Pointe de Saume, 3,035 m
- Punta dell'Alp, 3,033 m
- Pic de Caramantran, 3,025 m
- Pic de Château Renard, 2,989 m
- Longet, 2,969 m
- Main de Dieu, 2,915 m
- Pointe des Marcellettes, 2,910 m
- Pointe de Rasis, 2,846 m
- Tête de Paneyron, 2,787 m

=== Geology ===
The Escreins massif is essentially made up of sedimentary rocks, notably based on flysch.
