= Glaiza =

Glaiza is a given name. Notable people with the name include:

- Glaiza Castro Galura-Rainey (born 1988), known professionally as Glaiza de Castro, Filipina actress
- Glaiza Herradura (born 1978), Filipina former child actress

== See also ==
- Grand Glaiza, a mountain in the Alps
