= GR 58 =

Long-distance walking route in France

Coordinates: 44.6812°N 6.9678°E

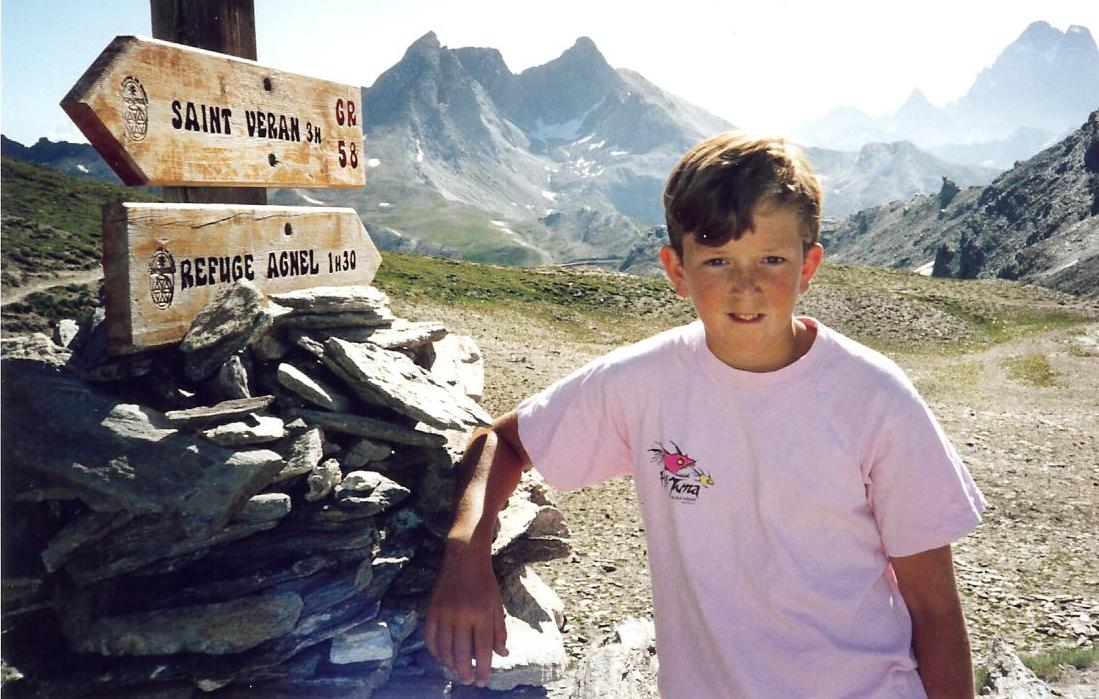
On the GR38 in 1989

The GR 58, also: Tour du Queyras, is a long-distance walking route of the Grande Randonnée network in France. It forms a 108 km long loop in the Queyras, one of France's regional parks, in the department of the Hautes-Alpes. It passes through Ceillac, Saint-Véran, Abriès, Les Fonds and Brunissard.
