= Ristolas =

Commune in Hautes-Alpes, France

- Part of Abriès-Ristolas
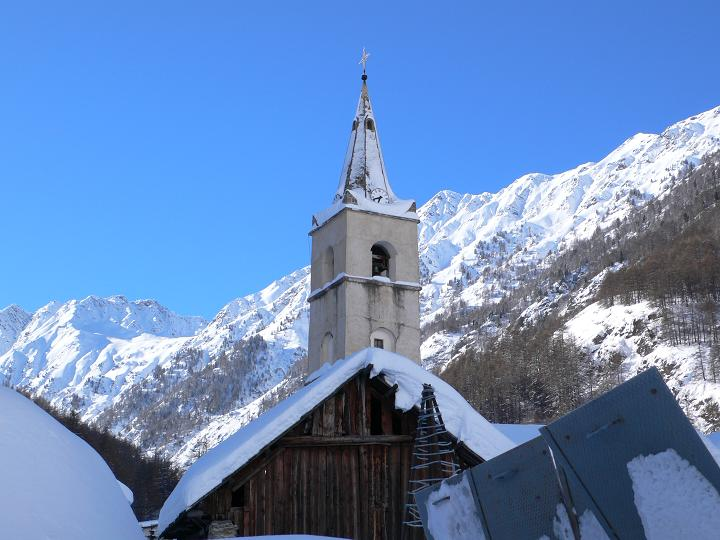
- The church of Ristolas

- Coat of arms
- Location of Ristolas
- Location within France Location within Provence-Alpes-Côte d'Azur
- Coordinates: 44°46′29″N 6°57′23″E
- Country: France
- Region: Provence-Alpes-Côte d'Azur
- Department: Hautes-Alpes
- Arrondissement: Briançon
- Canton: Guillestre
- Commune: Abriès-Ristolas
- Area^{1}: 82.18 km^{2} (31.73 sq mi)
- Elevation: 1,610 m (5,280 ft)
- Highest elevation: 3,294 m (10,807 ft)
- Lowest elevation: 1,571 m (5,154 ft)
- Population (2021): 97
  - Density: 1.2/km^{2} (3.1/sq mi)
- Time zone: UTC+01:00 (CET)
  - Summer (DST): UTC+02:00 (CEST)
- Postal code: 05460
- ^{1} French Land Register data, which excludes lakes, ponds, glaciers > 1 km^{2} (0.386 sq mi or 247 acres) and river estuaries.

Ristolas is a former commune in the Hautes-Alpes department in southeastern France. On 1 January 2019, it was merged into the new commune of Abriès-Ristolas. The village lies in the Queyras, in the northwestern part of the commune, on the left bank of the Guil, which has its source in the southeastern part of the commune.

== Climate ==
Climate data for Ristolas (1991–2020 averages, 2004–2024 extremes): elevation 1670m
| Month | Jan | Feb | Mar | Apr | May | Jun | Jul | Aug | Sep | Oct | Nov | Dec | Year |
|---|---|---|---|---|---|---|---|---|---|---|---|---|---|
| Record high °C (°F) | 15.1 (59.2) | 18.3 (64.9) | 19.6 (67.3) | 21.4 (70.5) | 26.3 (79.3) | 32.6 (90.7) | 31.3 (88.3) | 31.6 (88.9) | 29.9 (85.8) | 25.0 (77.0) | 19.8 (67.6) | 11.7 (53.1) | 32.6 (90.7) |
| Mean daily maximum °C (°F) | 2.8 (37.0) | 4.4 (39.9) | 7.1 (44.8) | 10.8 (51.4) | 14.9 (58.8) | 19.9 (67.8) | 23.1 (73.6) | 22.6 (72.7) | 18.7 (65.7) | 14.1 (57.4) | 7.3 (45.1) | 3.0 (37.4) | 12.4 (54.3) |
| Daily mean °C (°F) | −3.7 (25.3) | −3.0 (26.6) | 0.5 (32.9) | 4.5 (40.1) | 8.1 (46.6) | 12.1 (53.8) | 14.4 (57.9) | 13.9 (57.0) | 10.6 (51.1) | 6.8 (44.2) | 1.3 (34.3) | −3.1 (26.4) | 5.2 (41.4) |
| Mean daily minimum °C (°F) | −10.2 (13.6) | −10.5 (13.1) | −6.2 (20.8) | −1.8 (28.8) | 1.2 (34.2) | 4.2 (39.6) | 5.6 (42.1) | 5.2 (41.4) | 2.6 (36.7) | −0.5 (31.1) | −4.6 (23.7) | −9.2 (15.4) | −2.0 (28.4) |
| Record low °C (°F) | −22.4 (−8.3) | −26.0 (−14.8) | −24.0 (−11.2) | −15.5 (4.1) | −9.0 (15.8) | −5.3 (22.5) | −1.7 (28.9) | −4.2 (24.4) | −8.3 (17.1) | −15.5 (4.1) | −21.7 (−7.1) | −22.6 (−8.7) | −26.0 (−14.8) |
| Average precipitation mm (inches) | 35.2 (1.39) | 35.5 (1.40) | 50.9 (2.00) | 102.5 (4.04) | 119.0 (4.69) | 93.5 (3.68) | 56.6 (2.23) | 50.9 (2.00) | 74.7 (2.94) | 83.9 (3.30) | 142.5 (5.61) | 47.7 (1.88) | 892.9 (35.16) |
Source: Météo-France

== Population ==
Historical population

| Year | Pop. | ±% p.a. |
|---|---|---|
| 1793 | 716 | — |
| 1800 | 686 | −0.61% |
| 1806 | 750 | +1.50% |
| 1821 | 673 | −0.72% |
| 1831 | 643 | −0.45% |
| 1836 | 639 | −0.12% |
| 1841 | 618 | −0.67% |
| 1846 | 599 | −0.62% |
| 1851 | 600 | +0.03% |
| 1856 | 584 | −0.54% |
| 1861 | 601 | +0.58% |
| 1866 | 493 | −3.88% |
| 1872 | 380 | −4.25% |
| 1876 | 425 | +2.84% |
| 1881 | 411 | −0.67% |
| 1886 | 450 | +1.83% |
| 1891 | 373 | −3.68% |
| 1896 | 332 | −2.30% |

| Year | Pop. | ±% p.a. |
|---|---|---|
| 1901 | 308 | −1.49% |
| 1906 | 312 | +0.26% |
| 1911 | 285 | −1.79% |
| 1921 | 226 | −2.29% |
| 1926 | 192 | −3.21% |
| 1931 | 153 | −4.44% |
| 1936 | 158 | +0.65% |
| 1946 | 50 | −10.87% |
| 1954 | 59 | +2.09% |
| 1962 | 49 | −2.29% |
| 1968 | 50 | +0.34% |
| 1975 | 68 | +4.49% |
| 1982 | 52 | −3.76% |
| 1990 | 72 | +4.15% |
| 1999 | 78 | +0.89% |
| 2006 | 91 | +2.23% |
| 2011 | 80 | −2.54% |
| 2016 | 80 | +0.00% |

Source: EHESS (1793–1999) and INSEE

== See also ==
- Communes of the Hautes-Alpes department
