= Parpaillon Massif =

Mountain range in French Alps

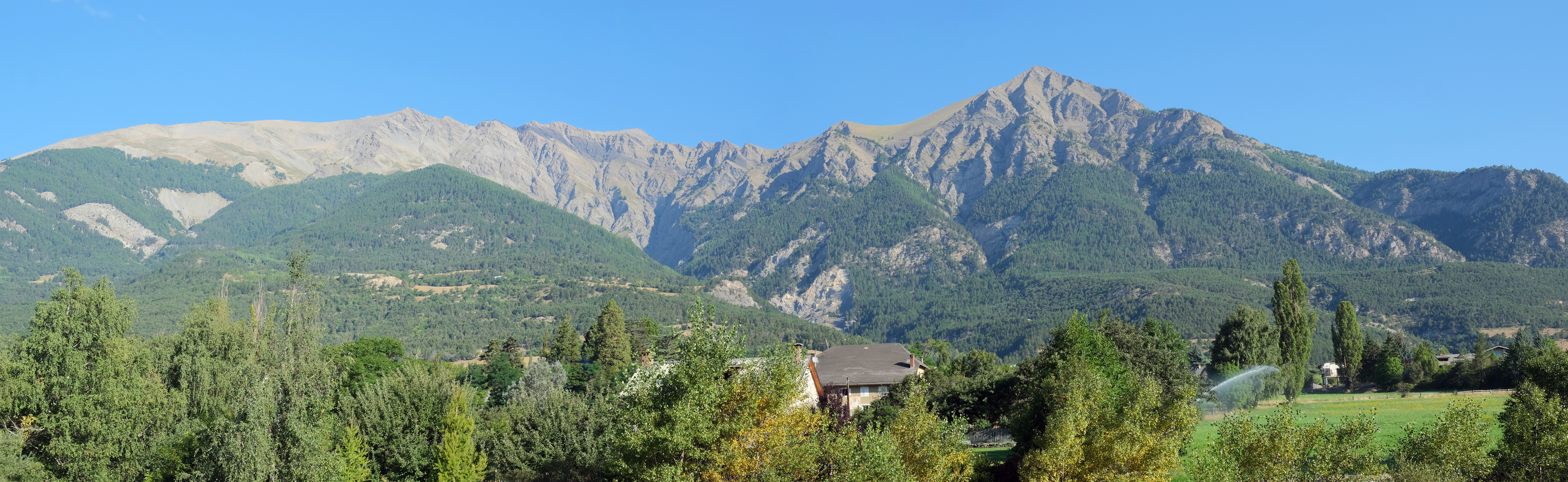
- Parpaillon Massif from Jausiers

Highest point
- Elevation: 3,046 m (9,993 ft)
- Parent peak: Grand Bérard
- Coordinates: 44°29′12″N 6°38′12″E

Naming
- Native name: Massif du Parpaillon (French)

Geography
- Location within Provence-Alpes-Côte d'Azur Location within France
- Country: France
- Departments: Hautes-Alpes; Alpes-de-Haute-Provence
- Region: Provence-Alpes-Côte d'Azur

The Parpaillon Massif (French: massif du Parpaillon, pronounced [masif dy paʁpajɔ̃]) is a massif in the French Alps. It serves as the boundary between the departments of Hautes-Alpes to the north and the Alpes-de-Haute-Provence to the south. Additionally, it separates the Embrun region from the Ubaye Valley. The massif extends from the Serre-Ponçon Lake in the west to the Col de Vars, which distinguishes it from the Escreins Massif, and to the middle Ubaye valley in the southeast, near Saint-Paul-sur-Ubaye, where it is bordered by the Mercantour-Argentera Massif and the Chambeyron Massif.

== Etymology ==
For some, the meaning of this toponym is papillon (transl. butterfly), which is "parpalhon" in Occitan. However, it is more likely derived from the pre-Gaulish (Ligurian) term "pal," which is common in the names of mountains and escarpments.

== Main summits ==
- Grand Bérard, 3,046 m (9,993 ft)
- Grand Parpaillon, 2,990 m (9,810 ft)
- Chalanche, 2,984 m (9,790 ft)
- Tête de Vallon Claous, 2,945 m (9,662 ft)
- Mont Tailland, 2,938 m (9,639 ft)
- Grande Combe, 2,937 m (9,636 ft)
- Tête de Crouès, 2,928 m (9,606 ft)
- Tête de Frusta, 2,926 m (9,600 ft)
- Barre de la Pisse, 2,925 m (9,596 ft)
- Tête du Crachet, 2,919 m (9,577 ft)
- Aupillon, 2,916 m (9,567 ft)
- Pouzenc, 2,898 m (9,508 ft)
- Grande Épervière, 2,884 m (9,462 ft)
- Pointe de l'Eyssina, 2,837 m (9,308 ft)
- Pic de Boussolenc, 2,832 m (9,291 ft)
- Montagnette, 2,811 m (9,222 ft)
- Pic de Chabrières, 2,727 m (8,947 ft)
- Pic de Morgon, 2,324 m (7,625 ft)
