= Lac des Cordes =

Lake in France

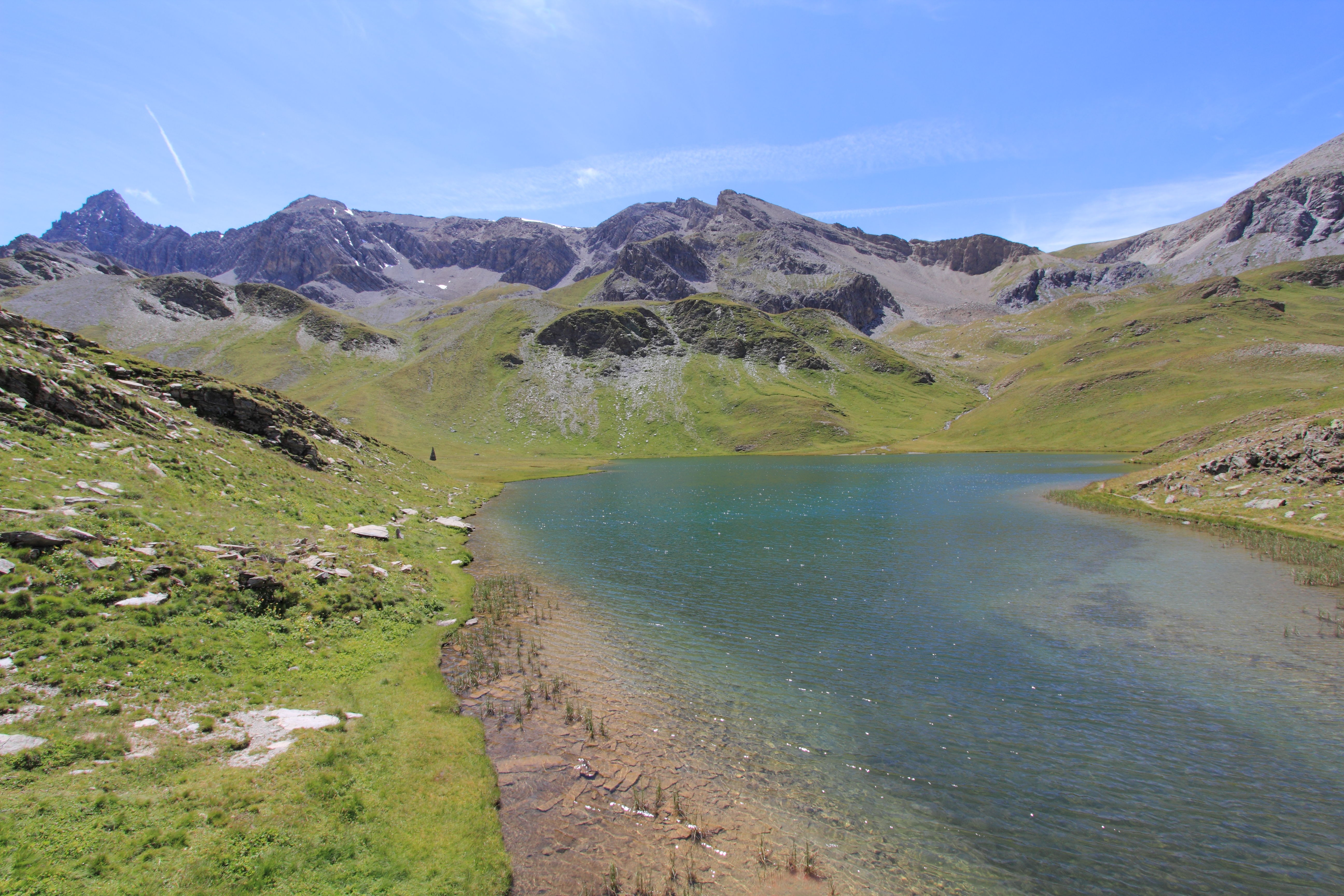
- Lac des Cordes (2446 m) and Pic de Rochebrune (3320 m)

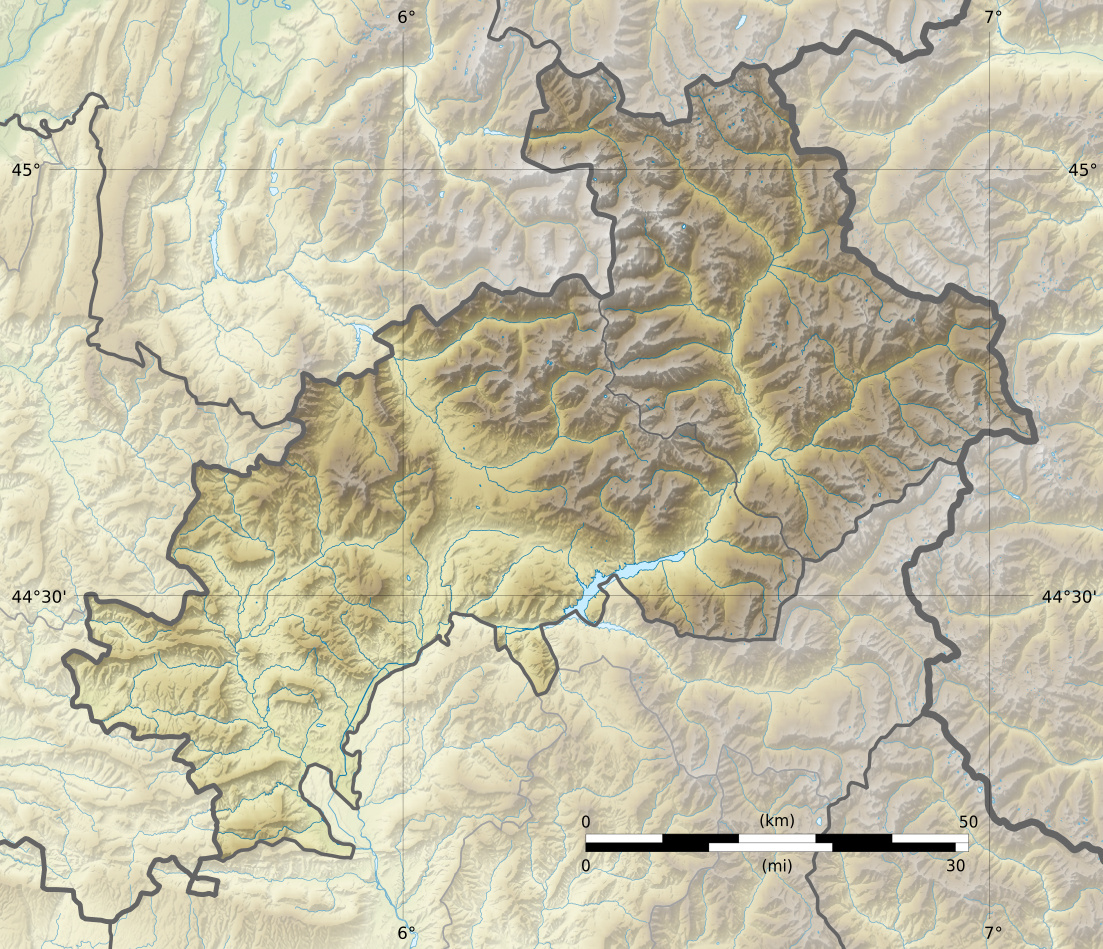
- Location within Hautes-Alpes
- Location: Hautes-Alpes
- Coordinates: 44.845°N 6.789°E
- Basin countries: France
- Max. length: 0.25 km (0.16 mi)
- Max. width: 0.12 km (0.075 mi)
- Surface area: 0.02 km^{2} (0.0077 sq mi)
- Surface elevation: 2,446 m (8,025 ft)

Lac des Cordes is a lake in Hautes-Alpes, France. At an elevation of 2,446 metres (8,025 ft), its surface area is 0.02 square kilometres (0.0077 sq mi). It is located close to the northern wall of the Pic de Rochebrune. []

The lake can be accessed by hiking, starting either from the hamlet of Bourgea (1,950 metres (6,400 ft)) or from the refuge of Fonts de Cervières (2,040 metres (6,690 ft).
