= Aiguilles =

- Commune
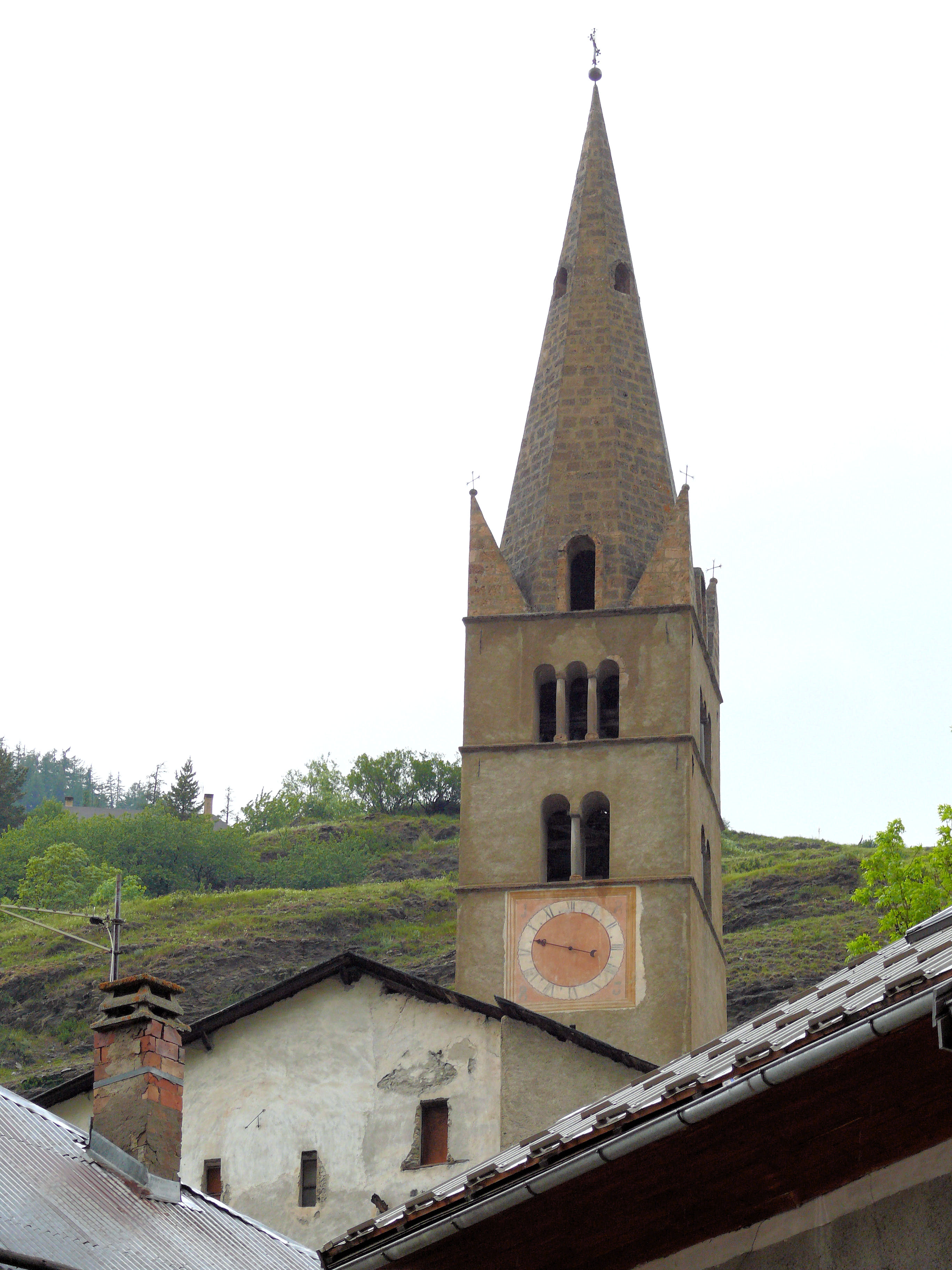
- The bell tower of the church of Saint-Jean-Baptiste

- Coat of arms
- Location of Aiguilles
- Location within France Location within Provence-Alpes-Côte d'Azur
- Coordinates: 44°46′57″N 6°52′11″E
- Country: France
- Region: Provence-Alpes-Côte d'Azur
- Department: Hautes-Alpes
- Arrondissement: Briançon
- Canton: Guillestre
- Intercommunality: Guillestrois et Queyras

Government
  - Mayor (2026–32): Dominique Bucci Alberto
- Area^{1}: 40.16 km^{2} (15.51 sq mi)
- Elevation: 1,471 m (4,826 ft)
- Highest elevation: 3,078 m (10,098 ft)
- Lowest elevation: 1,400 m (4,600 ft)
- Population (2023): 369
  - Density: 9.19/km^{2} (23.8/sq mi)
- Time zone: UTC+01:00 (CET)
  - Summer (DST): UTC+02:00 (CEST)
- INSEE/Postal code: 05003 /05470
- ^{1} French Land Register data, which excludes lakes, ponds, glaciers > 1 km^{2} (0.386 sq mi or 247 acres) and river estuaries.

Aiguilles (French pronunciation: [ɛɡɥij]; Occitan: Agulhas) is a commune of the Hautes-Alpes department in southeastern France.

== Geography ==
The village lies in situated in the center of the commune, on the right bank of the Guil River, which flows southwest through the area.

== Population ==
Historical population
| Year | Pop. | ±% p.a. |
|---|---|---|
| 1968 | 249 | — |
| 1975 | 275 | +1.43% |
| 1982 | 310 | +1.73% |
| 1990 | 377 | +2.48% |
| 1999 | 441 | +1.76% |
| 2007 | 412 | −0.85% |
| 2012 | 449 | +1.73% |
| 2017 | 429 | −0.91% |
| 2023 | 369 | −2.48% |
Source: INSEE

== See also ==
- Communes of the Hautes-Alpes department
- Pic de Petit Rochebrune
