= Col d'Izoard =

Mountain pass in the French Alps

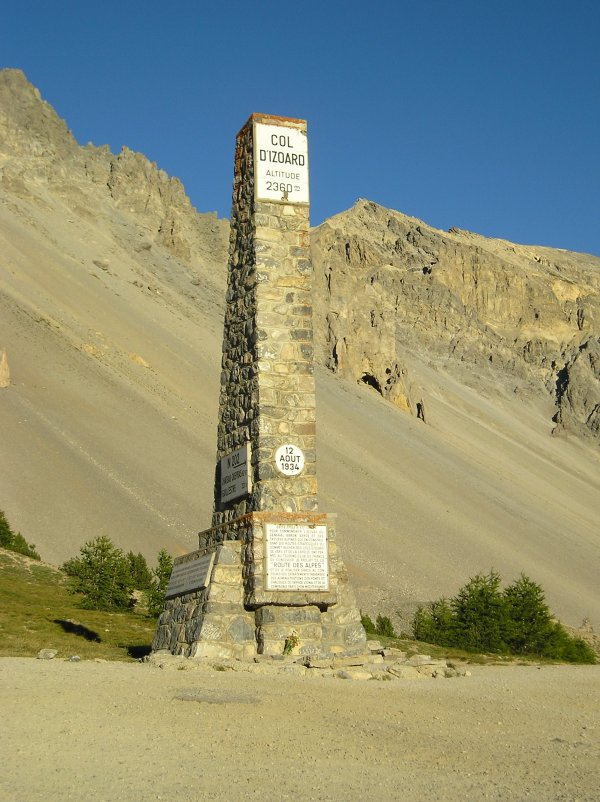
- Memorial at the top of Col d'Izoard

- Location within Alps
- Elevation: 2,360 m (7,740 ft)
- Traversed by: D902

Third Approach
- Location: Hautes-Alpes, France
- Range: Alps
- Coordinates: 44°49′11″N 06°44′06″E

Col d'Izoard (2,360 m (7,743 ft)) is a mountain pass in the Alps in the department of Hautes-Alpes in France.

It is accessible in summer via the D902 road, connecting Briançon on the north and the valley of the Guil in Queyras, which ends at Guillestre in the south. There are forbidding and barren scree slopes with protruding pinnacles of weathered rock on the upper south side. Known as the Casse Déserte, this area has formed a dramatic backdrop to some key moments in the Tour de France and at times in the Giro d'Italia, and often featured in iconic 1950s black-and-white photos of the race.

== Cycle racing ==
=== Details of the climb ===
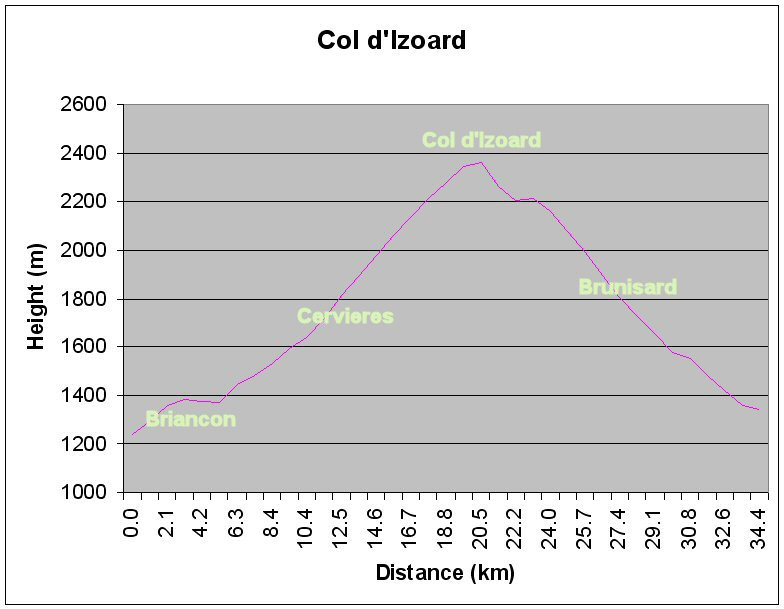
Altimetry of the climb.

From the south, the climb starts at Guillestre from where it is 31.5 km (19.6 mi) in length, at an average gradient of 4.8%. The climb proper starts at the junction with the D947, near Chateau Queyras from where the ascent is 15.9 km (9.9 mi) long. Over this distance, the climb gains 1,095 m (3,593 ft) at an average of 6.9% and a maximum sustained gradient of 12%.

The climb from Briançon, to the north-west, via Cervières to the col is 19 km (11.8 mi) in length, climbing 1,105 m (3,625 ft) at an average gradient of 5.8% and a maximum gradient of 9.4%.

On both sides mountain pass cycling milestones are placed every kilometre. They indicate the current height, the height of the summit, the distance to the summit, as well as the average slope in the following kilometre.

In general, the col is closed from October to early June.

=== Tour de France ===
The Col d'Izoard is frequently on the route of the Tour de France, where it is frequently classified as an Hors Categorie climb. Warren Barguil won the 2017 Tour de France's Stage 18, becoming the first cyclist to win a Tour de France stage that finished on the Col d'Izoard – it has been on the route 34 times previously in the Tour de France since 1922 but never before had a stage finished there.

Several of the Tour de France's more memorable moments have occurred on the Col d'Izoard, particularly the exploits of Gino Bartali, Fausto Coppi, Louison Bobet and Bernard Thévenet. A small cycling museum is at the summit, along with a memorial to Coppi and Bobet.

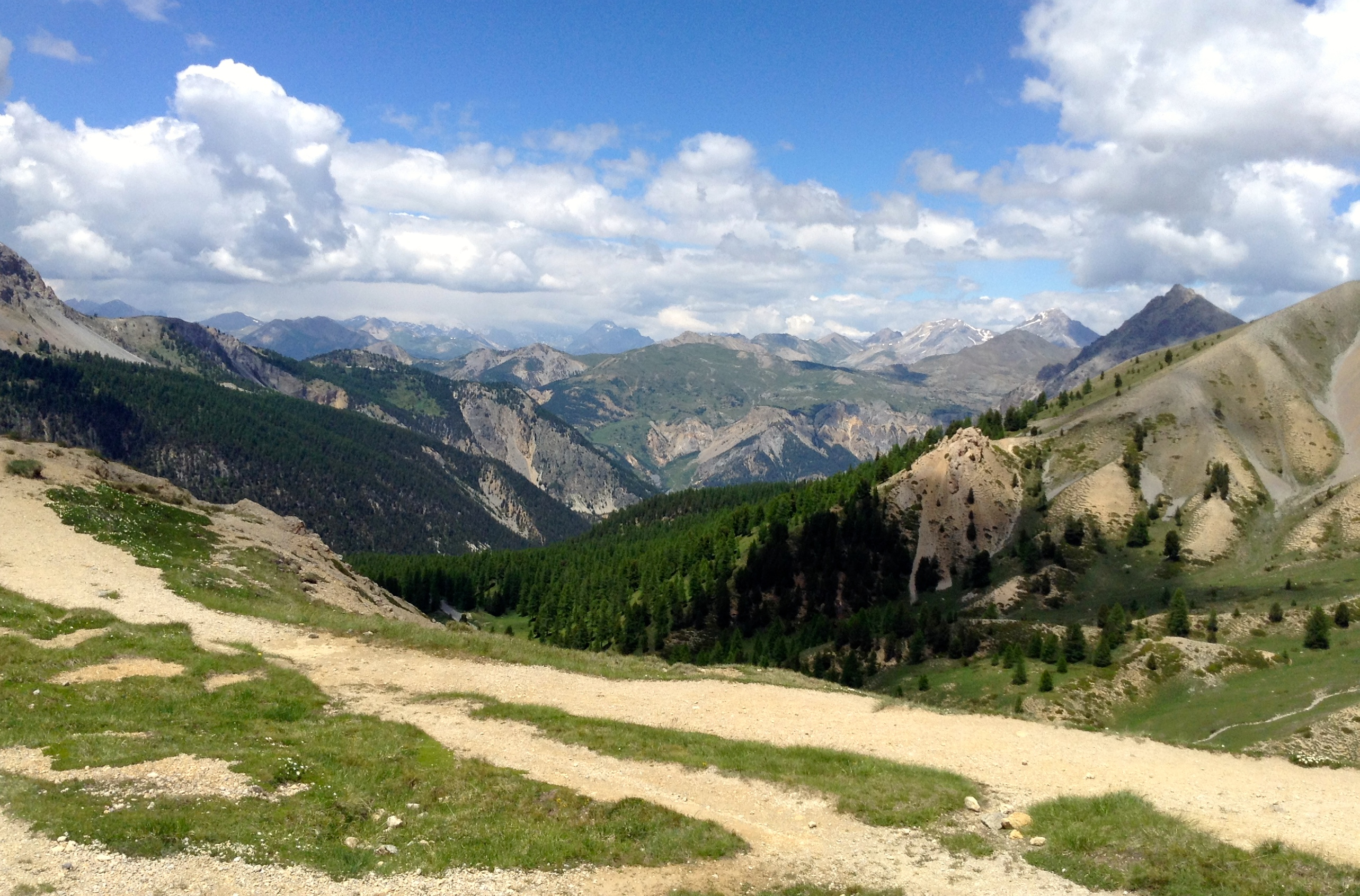
Panoramic view from the summit

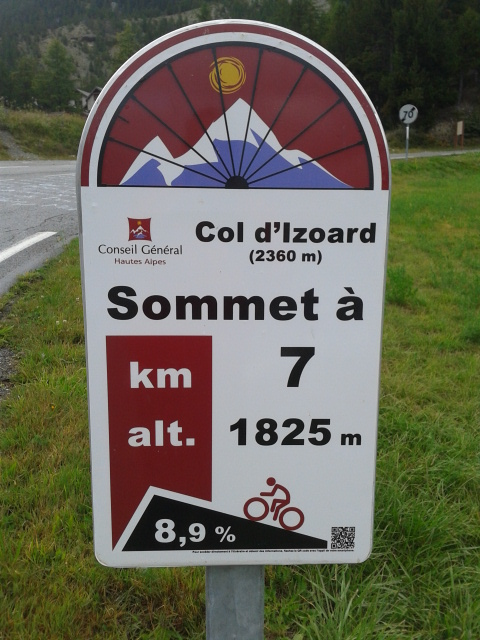
One of the mountain pass cycling milestones placed along the climb from Guillestre

==== Appearances in the Tour de France ====
Year	Stage	Category	Start	Finish	Leader at the summit
2019	18	H	Embrun	Valloire	Damiano Caruso (ITA)
2017	18	H	Briançon	Col d'Izoard	Warren Barguil (FRA)
2014	14	H	Grenoble	Risoul	Joaquim Rodríguez (ESP)
2011	18	H	Pinerolo	Galibier/Serre-Chevalier	Maxim Iglinsky (KAZ)
2006	15	H	Gap	Alpe d'Huez	Stefano Garzelli (ITA)
2003	9	H	Bourg-d'Oisans	Gap	Aitor Garmendia (ESP)
2000	14	H	Draguignan	Briançon	Santiago Botero (COL)
1993	11	1	Serre-Chevalier	Isola 2000	Claudio Chiappucci (ITA)
1989	16	H	Gap	Briançon	Pascal Richard (SUI)
1986	17	H	Gap	Serre-Chevalier	Eduardo Chozas (ESP)
1976	10	1	Bourg-d'Oisans	Montgenèvre	Lucien Van Impe (BEL)
1975	16	1	Barcelonnette	Serre-Chevalier	Bernard Thévenet (FRA)
1973	8	1	Moûtiers	Les Orres	José Manuel Fuente (ESP)
1972	13	1	Orcières-Merlette	Briançon	Eddy Merckx (BEL)
1965	16	1	Gap	Briançon	Joaquim Galera (ESP)
1962	18	1	Antibes/Juan-les-Pins	Briançon	Federico Bahamontes (ESP)
1960	16	1	Gap	Briançon	Imerio Massignan (ITA)
1958	20	1	Gap	Briançon	Federico Bahamontes (ESP)
1956	17	1	Gap	Turin	Valentin Huot (FRA)
1954	18	1	Grenoble	Briançon	Louison Bobet (FRA)
1953	18	1	Gap	Briançon	Louison Bobet (FRA)
1951	20	1	Gap	Briançon	Fausto Coppi (ITA)
1950	18	1	Gap	Briançon	Louison Bobet (FRA)
1949	16	1	Cannes	Briançon	Fausto Coppi (ITA)
1948	13	1	Cannes	Briançon	Gino Bartali (ITA)
1947	9	1	Briançon	Digne	Jean Robic (FRA)
1939	15		Digne	Briançon	Sylvère Maes (BEL)
1938	14		Digne	Briançon	Gino Bartali (ITA)
1937	9		Briançon	Digne	Julian Berrendero (ESP)
1936	9		Briançon	Digne	Sylvère Maes (BEL)
1927	16		Nice	Briançon	Nicolas Frantz (LUX)
1926	14		Nice	Briançon	Bartolomeo Aymo (ITA)
1925	13		Nice	Briançon	Bartolomeo Aymo (ITA)
1924	10		Nice	Briançon	Nicolas Frantz (LUX)
1923	10		Nice	Briançon	Henri Pélissier (FRA)
1922	10		Nice	Briançon	Philippe Thijs (BEL)

=== Giro d'Italia ===
The Col d'Izoard was 7 times on the route of the Giro d'Italia. The most famous passage over the Col was in 1949, when Coppi beat Bartali in the memorable stage from Cuneo to Pinerolo, taking the pink jersey.

==== Appearances in the Giro d'Italia ====
Year	Stage	Start	Finish	Leader at the summit
2007	12	Scalenghe	Briançon	Danilo Di Luca (ITA)
2000	19	Saluzzo	Briançon	Francesco Casagrande (ITA)
1996	14	Santuario di Vicoforte	Briançon	Pascal Richard (SUI)
1994	20	Cuneo	Les Deux Alpes	Marco Pantani (ITA)
1982	21	Cuneo	Pinerolo	Lucien Van Impe (BEL)
1964	20	Cuneo	Pinerolo	Franco Bitossi (ITA)
1949	17	Cuneo	Pinerolo	Fausto Coppi (ITA)

== See also ==
- List of highest paved roads in Europe
- List of mountain passes
- Souvenir Henri Desgrange
