= Chambeyron Massif =

Mountain range in France and Italy

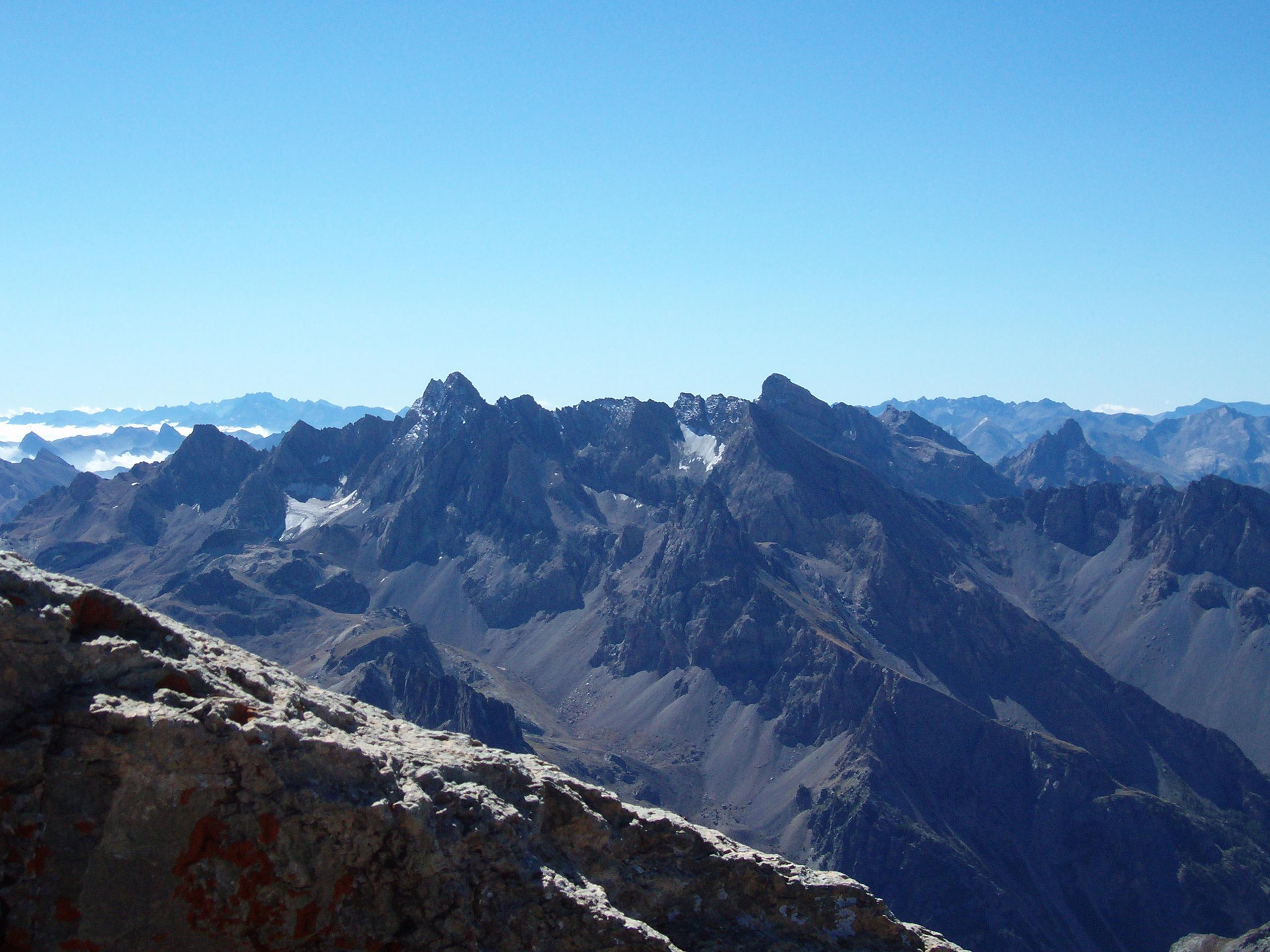
- The Chambeyron Massif and the north face of Aiguille de Chambeyron

Highest point
- Elevation: 3,412 m (11,194 ft)
- Parent peak: Aiguille de Chambeyron
- Coordinates: 44°32′21″N 6°49′38″E

Naming
- Native name: Massif de Chambeyron (French); Gruppo del Chambeyron (Italian)

Geography
- Location within Provence-Alpes-Côte d'Azur Location within France Location within Piedmont Location within Italy
- Countries: France; Italy
- Regions: Provence-Alpes-Côte d’Azur; Piedmont

Geology
- Rock age: Cretaceous to Pre-Permian

The Chambeyron Massif (French: Massif de Chambeyron, pronounced [masif də ʃɑ̃beʁɔ̃]; Occitan: Massís Chambeyron; Italian: Gruppo del Chambeyron) is a massif in the Alps, straddling between France and Italy, between the Escreins Massif, the Cottian Alps and the Mercantour-Argentera Massif. It occupies the high valleys of Ubaye, Maira, Varaita and Stura di Demonte.

== Main summits ==
The main peaks are:

- Aiguille de Chambeyron, 3,412 m (11,194 ft)
- Brec de Chambeyron, 3,389 m (11,119 ft)
- Bric de Rubren, 3,340 m (10,960 ft)
- Pointe d’Aval (or Chauvet), 3,320 m (10,890 ft)
- Pic du Pelvat, 3,220 m (10,560 ft)
- Tête de Malacoste, 3,216 m (10,551 ft)
- Brec de l’Homme, 3,211 m (10,535 ft)
- Pointe-Haute de Mary, 3,206 m (10,518 ft)
- Roche Blanche, 3,193 m (10,476 ft)
- Pointe du Fond du Roure, 3,184 m (10,446 ft)
- Dents de Maniglia, 3,183 m (10,443 ft)
- Monte Sautron, 3,166 m (10,387 ft)
- Tête de Sautron, 3,165 m (10,384 ft)
- Pelvat de Chabrière, 3,157 m (10,358 ft)
- Tête de la Fréma, 3,151 m (10,338 ft)
- Cima di Pienasea, 3,132 m (10,276 ft)
- Pointe-Basse de Mary, 3,126 m (10,256 ft)
- Serrière de la Testera, 3,126 m (10,256 ft)
- Tête de Moïse, 3,104 m (10,184 ft)
- Monte Ferra, 3,094 m (10,151 ft)
- Pelvo d’Elva, 3,064 m (10,052 ft)
- Monte Faraut, 3,046 m (9,993 ft)
- Monte Chersogno, 3,026 m (9,928 ft)
- Cima Sebolet, 3,023 m (9,918 ft)
- Rocca Bianca, 3,021 m (9,911 ft)

== Geology ==
The massif is part of the Internal Alps, and it is mainly made up of sedimentary rocks, notably dolomitic limestones and shale.

=== Glaciation ===
The Chambeyron Massif is very lightly glaciated. Most glaciers are disappearing, or have disappeared during the 20th century. Only the Marinet glaciers (north face of the Aiguille de Chambeyron), as well as the Chauvet glacier, remain.
