= Pic de Rochebrune =

Mountain in France

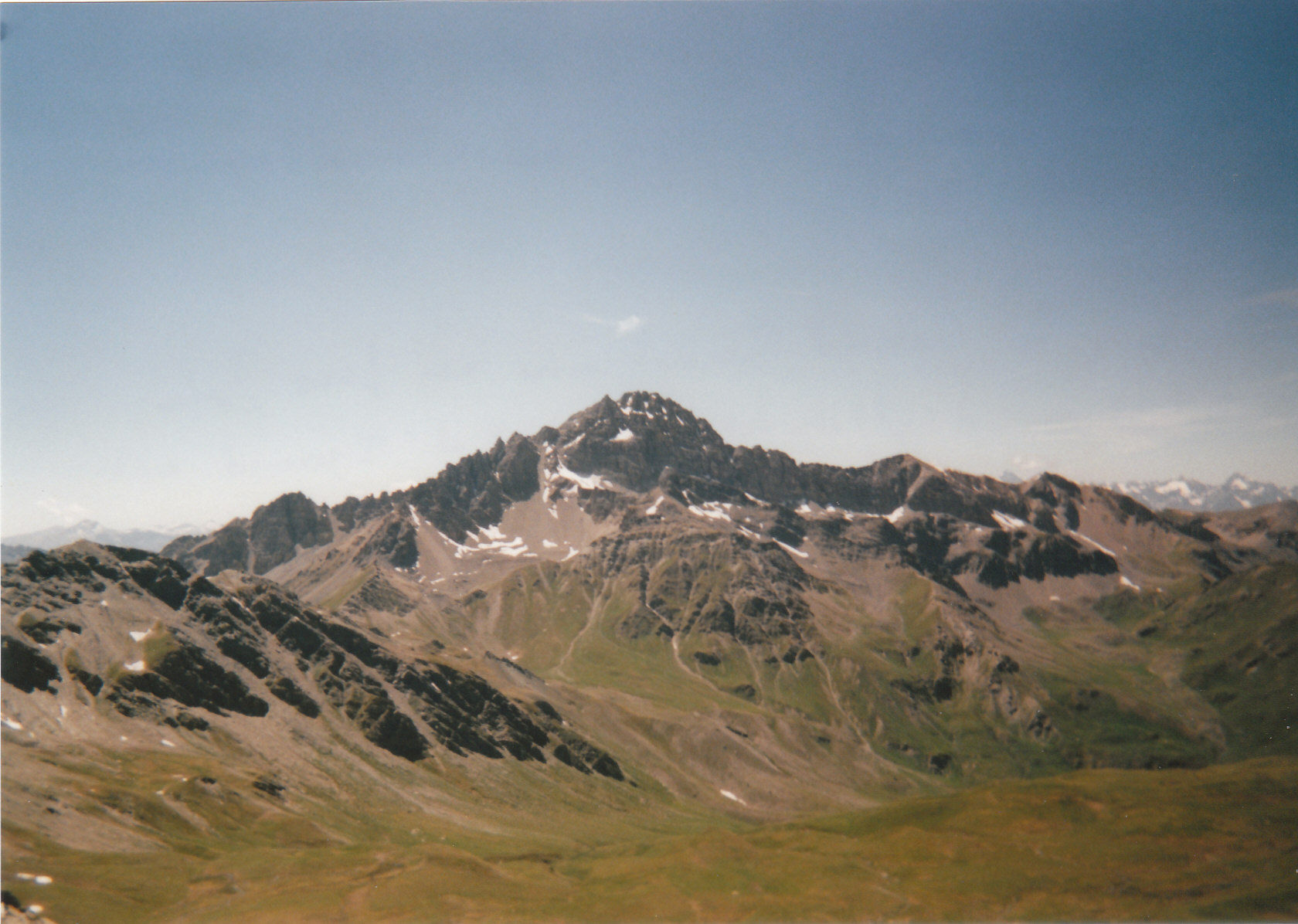
- Pic de Rochebrune: eastern slopes

Highest point
- Elevation: 3,320 m (10,890 ft)
- Prominence: 1,019 m (3,343 ft)
- Isolation: 24.18 km (15.02 mi)
- Listing: Alpine mountains above 3000 m
- Coordinates: 44°49′21″N 06°47′14″E

Geography
- Location within Alps
- Location: Provence-Alpes-Côte d'Azur, France
- Parent range: Cottian Alps

Climbing
- Easiest route: from col d'Izoard

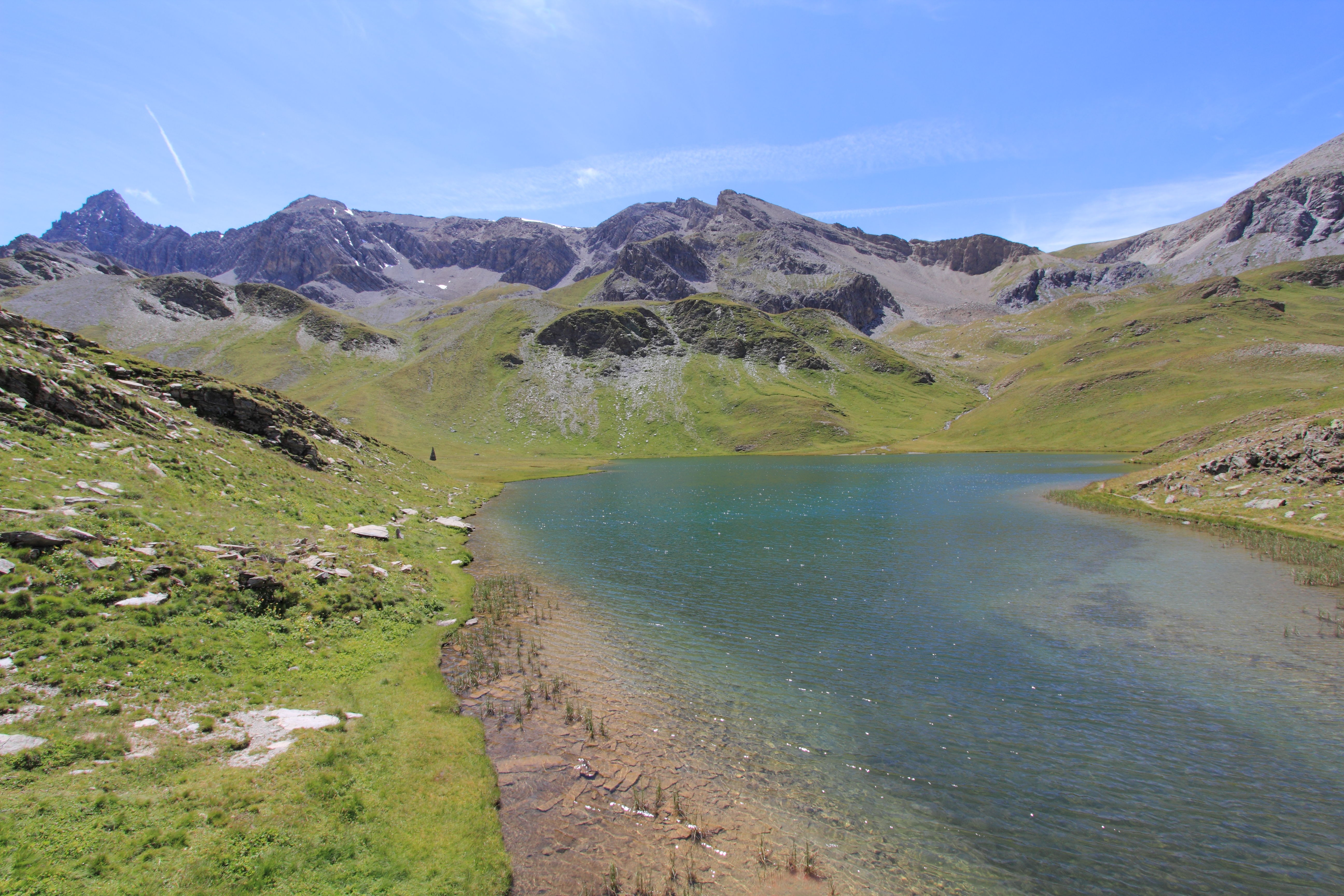
Northern slopes of the Pic de Rochebrune as seen from the Lac des Cordes

The Pic de Rochebrune (or Grand Rochebrune or, simply, Rochebrune; Occitan: Pica de Ròca Bruna) is a mountain in the Cottian Alps belonging to the French department of Hautes-Alpes.

== Etymology ==
The literal English translation of Pic de Rochebrune can be dark rock peak or brown rock peak.

== Geography ==
The mountain is the highest summit of the Central Cottian Alps.

== Nature conservation ==
The Pic de Rochebrune is located on the northern border of the regional nature park of Queyras (Parc naturel régional du Queyras ), established in 1977.

== Access to the summit ==
The easiest route to reach the summit starts from the Izoard pass. It requires some climbing skills.

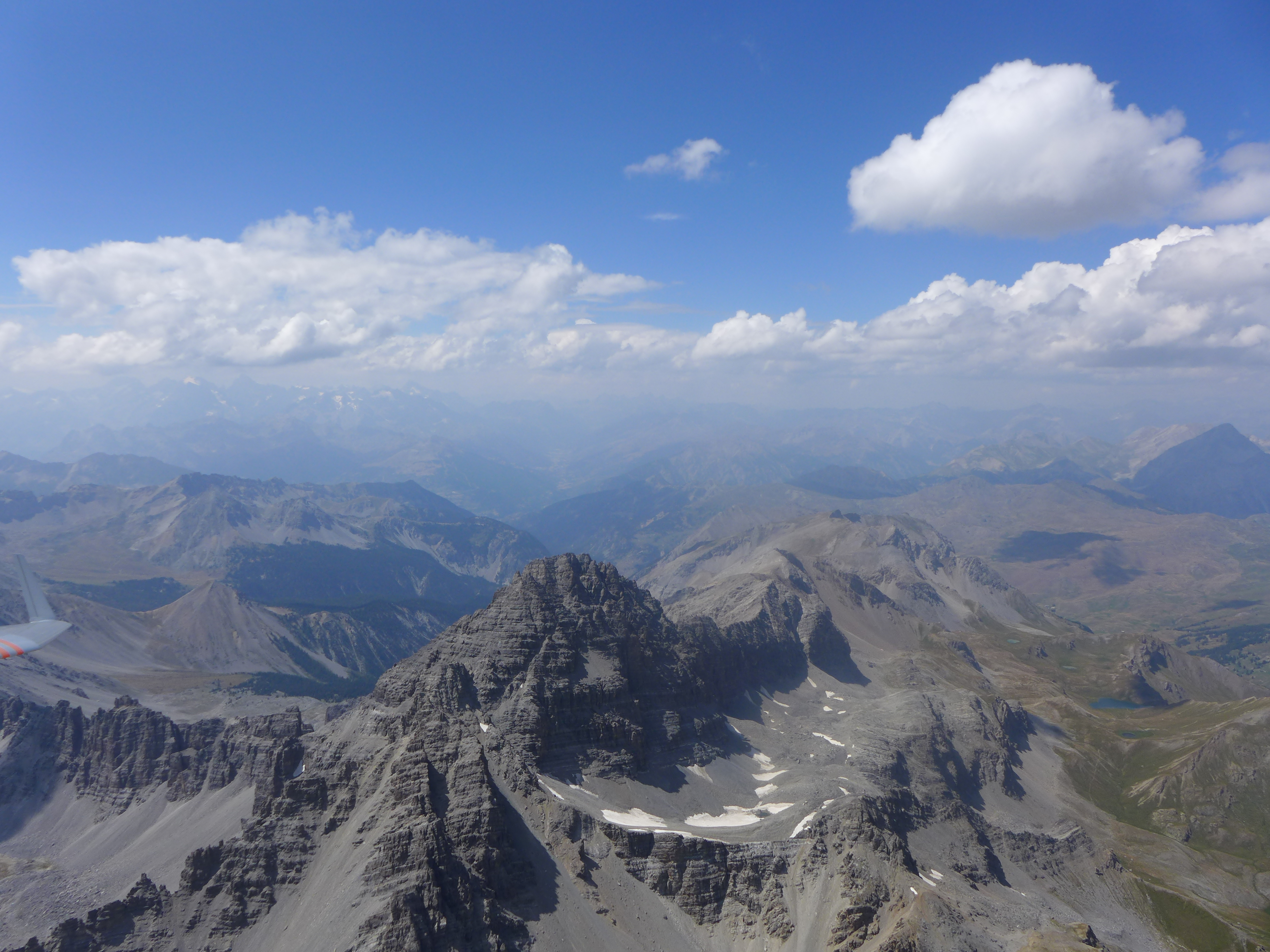
Pic de Rochebrune

== Maps ==
- French official cartography (Institut géographique national - IGN); on-line version: www.geoportail.fr

== See also ==
- Pic de Petit Rochebrune
