= Cervières, Hautes-Alpes =

Cervières
- Commune
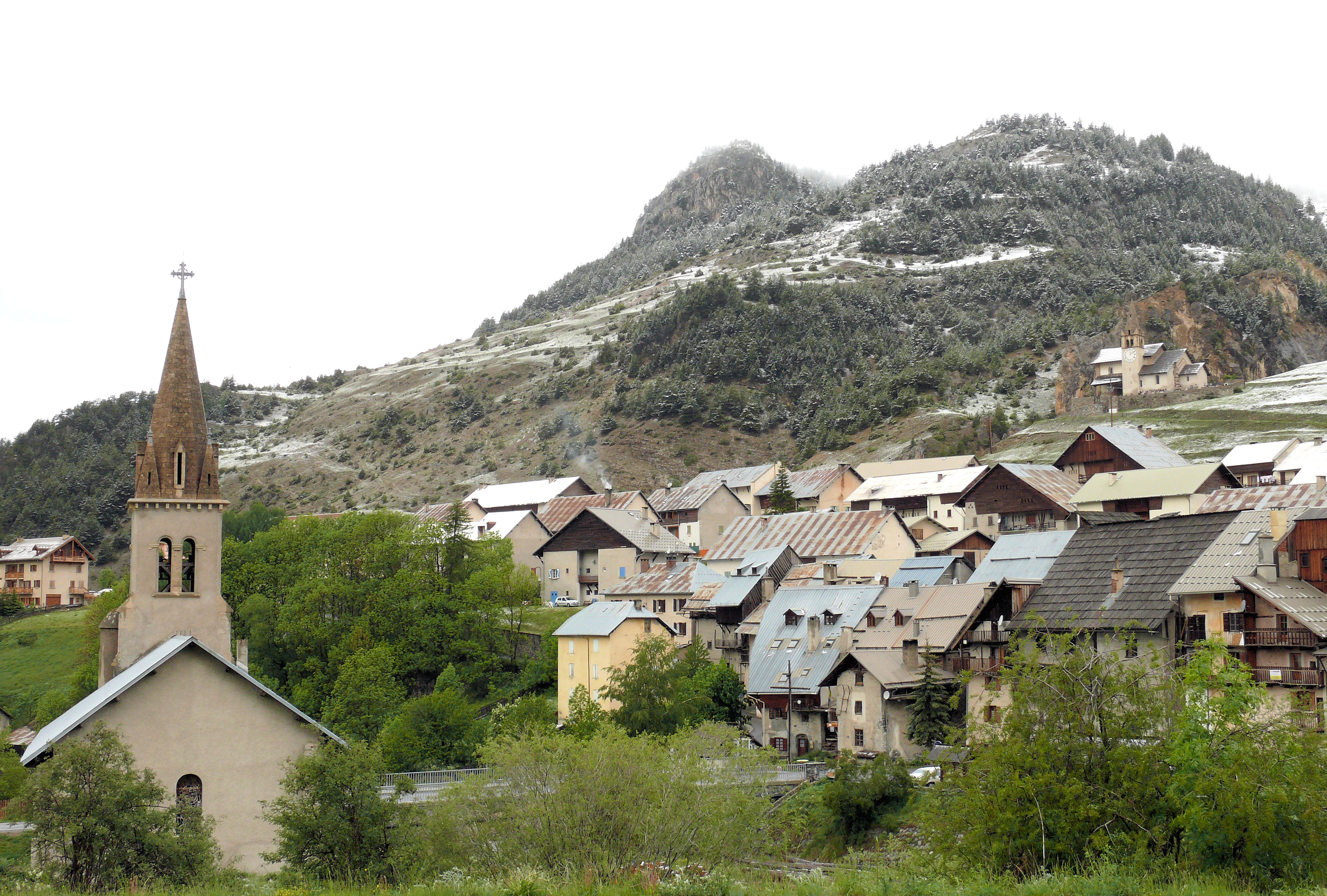
- A view of the church of Saint-Michel-et-Saint-Mammès and the church of Saint-Michel

- Coat of arms
- Location of Cervières
- Location within France Location within Provence-Alpes-Côte d'Azur
- Coordinates: 44°52′14″N 6°43′21″E
- Country: France
- Region: Provence-Alpes-Côte d'Azur
- Department: Hautes-Alpes
- Arrondissement: Briançon
- Canton: Briançon-1
- Intercommunality: Briançonnais

Government
  - Mayor (2026–32): Jean-Franck Vioujas
- Area^{1}: 109.68 km^{2} (42.35 sq mi)
- Elevation: 1,620 m (5,310 ft)
- Highest elevation: 3,294 m (10,807 ft)
- Lowest elevation: 1,375 m (4,511 ft)
- Population (2023): 205
  - Density: 1.87/km^{2} (4.84/sq mi)
- Time zone: UTC+01:00 (CET)
  - Summer (DST): UTC+02:00 (CEST)
- INSEE/Postal code: 05027 /05100
- ^{1} French Land Register data, which excludes lakes, ponds, glaciers > 1 km^{2} (0.386 sq mi or 247 acres) and river estuaries.

Cervières (Vivaro-Alpine dialect: Sarvèira, pronounced [saʁˈvɛjro]) is a commune in the Hautes-Alpes department in southeastern France.

The village lies at the foot of the Col d'Izoard, which is often on the route of the Tour de France and Giro d'Italia.

== Population ==
Historical population
| Year | Pop. | ±% p.a. |
|---|---|---|
| 1968 | 111 | — |
| 1975 | 96 | −2.05% |
| 1982 | 105 | +1.29% |
| 1990 | 120 | +1.68% |
| 1999 | 129 | +0.81% |
| 2007 | 144 | +1.38% |
| 2012 | 175 | +3.98% |
| 2017 | 188 | +1.44% |
| 2023 | 205 | +1.45% |
Source: INSEE

== See also ==
- Communes of the Hautes-Alpes department
- Pic de Rochebrune
- Pic de Petit Rochebrune
