= Queyras =

Valley of the Hautes-Alpes department

Coordinates: 44°45′N 6°47′E

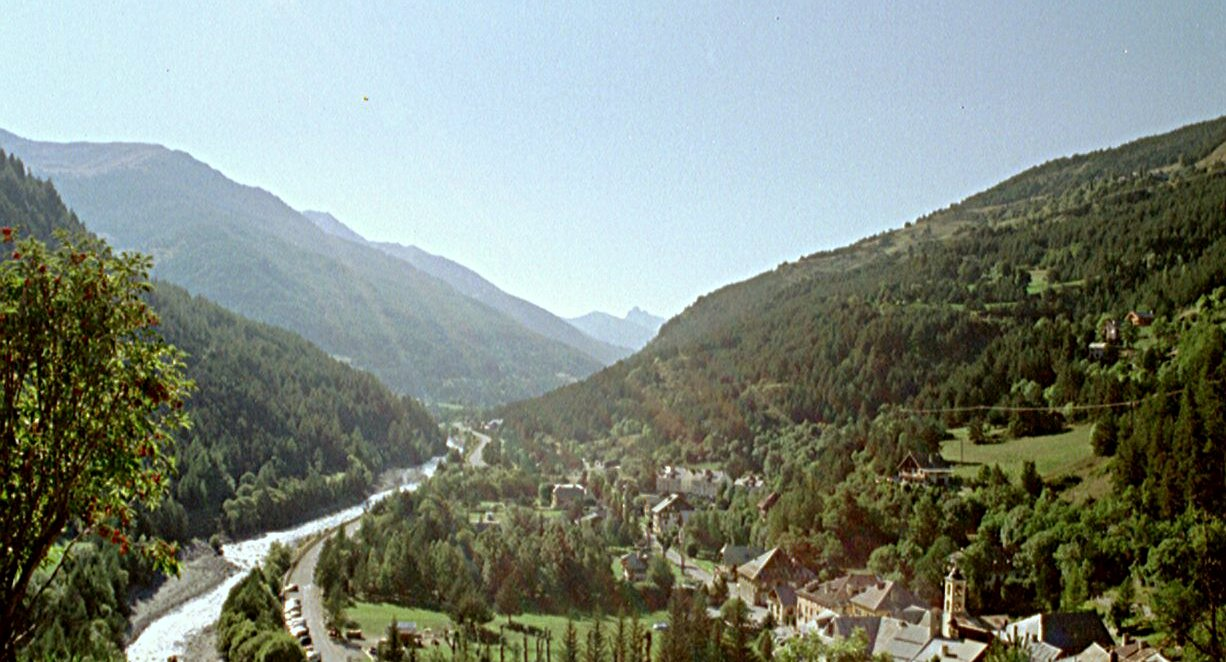
A small village in the Queyras Valley

Emblem of the Parc naturel régional du Queyras

The Queyras (French pronunciation: [kɛʁa]; Occitan: Cairàs) is a valley located in the French Hautes-Alpes, of which the geographical extent is the basin of the river Guil, a tributary of the Durance. The Queyras is one of the oldest mountain ranges of the Alps, and it was one of the last ones to be opened to public tourism towards the end of the 20th century, thus being relatively untouched by environmental destruction.

The Queyras is also one of the 58 Regional nature parks of France.

The GR58, also known as the Tour du Queyras ("The tour of Queyras" in French), is a long-distance walking route that forms a 108-km hiking loop in the Queyras.

Notable mountains around the valley include:

- The Font Sancte (Queyras' highest mountain)
- The Taillante
- The Pic de Rochebrune – 3.324 m
- The Grand Queyras – 3.114 m
- The Pic de Petit Rochebrune – 3.078 m
- The Bric Bouchet
- The Pain de Sucre (literally translating as "Sugar Loaf" due to its distinct shape, similar to the Sugarloaf in Rio de Janeiro).

There are two passes leading into the valley:

- Col Agnel
- Col d'Izoard

== See also ==
- 128633 Queyras, asteroid named after the valley
