= Pics de la Font Sancte =

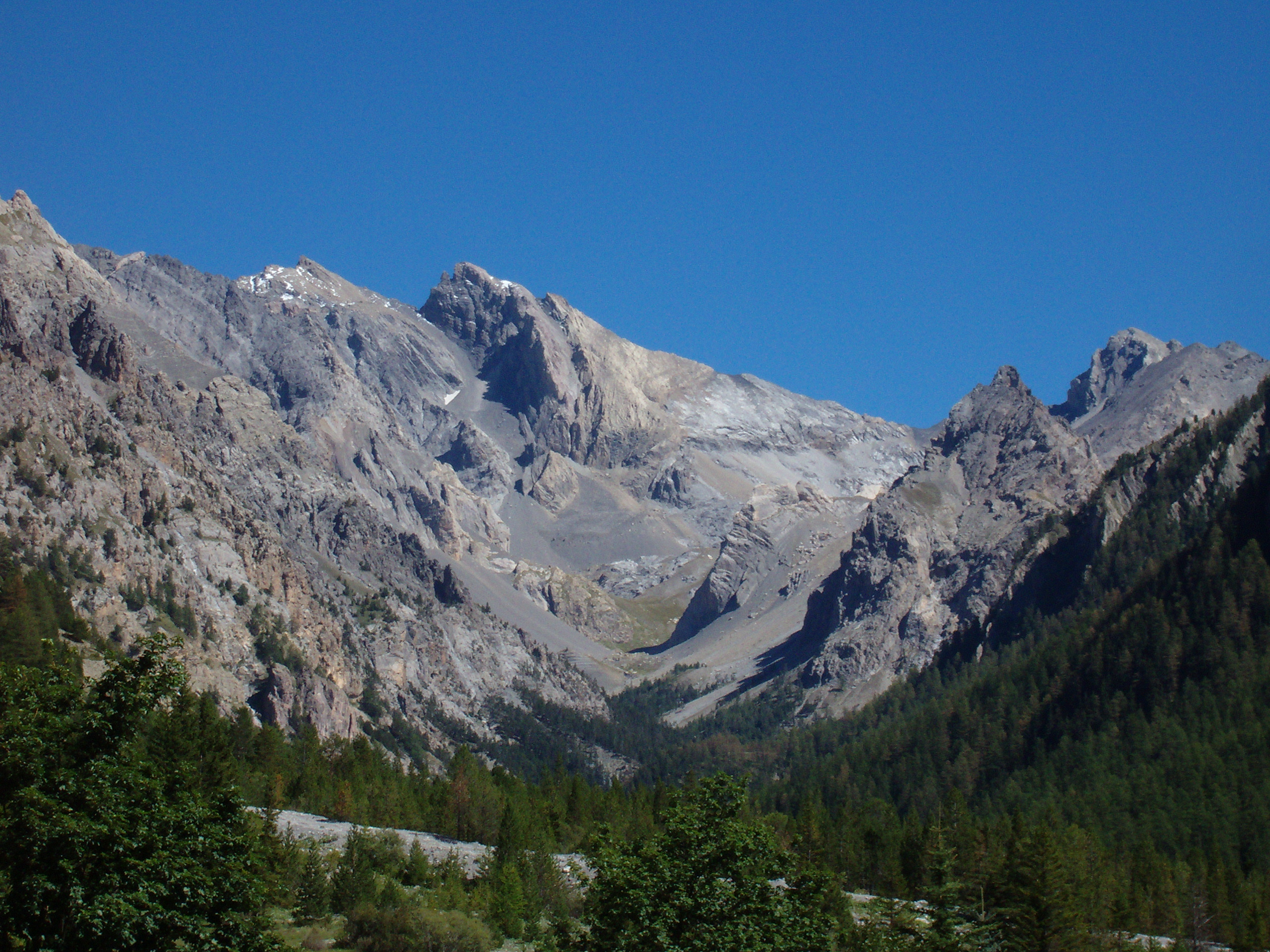
- The Pics de la Font Sancte

Highest point
- Elevation: 3,385 m (11,106 ft)
- Prominence: 724 m (2,375 ft)
- Isolation: 7.74 km (4.81 mi)
- Listing: Alpine mountains above 3000 m
- Coordinates: 44°36′16″N 6°47′59″E

Geography
- Location within Alps
- Location: Hautes-Alpes, France
- Parent range: Cottian Alps

The Pics de la Font Sancte is a mountain with two summits between the upper Ubaye Valley, Val Escreins and the Ceillac Valley, at the edge of the Queyras Regional Park. It is the highest peak of the Escreins Massif in the southern Cottian Alps in Hautes-Alpes, France. Its northern summit is 3,385 metres (11,106 ft) high and its south summit 3,371 metres (11,060 ft). They take their name from the Font Sancte, a source that springs from the rock in the valley at the foot of the peaks at 2,358 m.

The northern peak is climbed mostly from the west. The maximum slope is around 40° in the narrowest part of a corridor. It is recommended to climb it when it is snow-covered, so as to minimize the risk of falling rocks from the corridor, but also from the wall of the south peak. It then comes down to mountaineering. After the corridor has been climbed, access to the summit is possible for very good hikers. There is a big risk of rockfall on the mountain.

The south peak is accessible from the west, climbing the mountain ridge.
