= Guil =

River in southeastern France

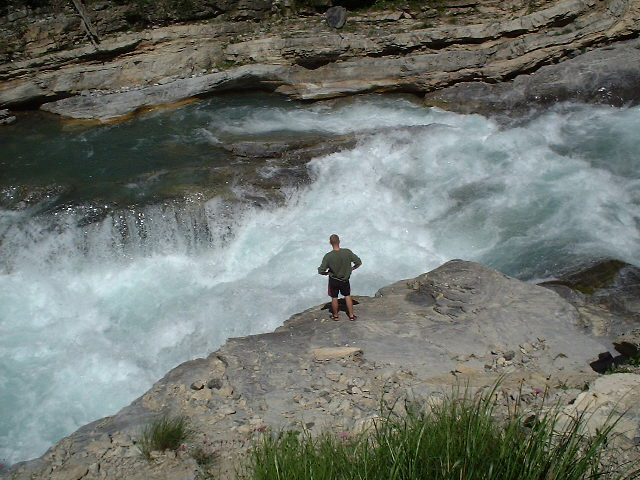
- The Guil.

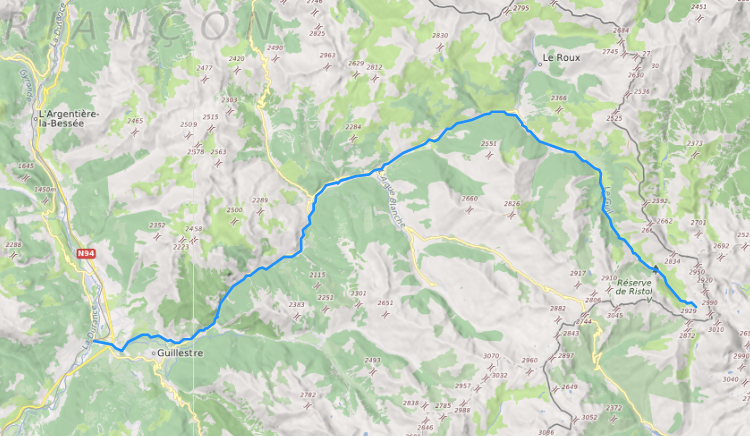

Location
- Country: France

Physical characteristics
- Source
  - location: Ristolas
  - coordinates: 44°41′14″N 07°03′56″E
  - elevation: 2,510 m (8,230 ft)
- Mouth
  - location: Durance
  - coordinates: 44°40′01″N 06°36′05″E
  - elevation: 875 m (2,871 ft)
- Length: 51.6 km (32.1 mi)
- Basin size: 727 km^{2} (281 sq mi)
- Discharge
  - average: 17 m^{3}/s (600 cu ft/s)

Basin features
- Progression: Durance→ Rhône→ Mediterranean Sea

The Guil (French: le Guil) is a 51.6-kilometre (32.1 mi) long river in the Hautes-Alpes département, southeastern France. Its drainage basin is 727 km^{2} (281 sq mi). Its source is several small streams which converge into the lake Lestio, at Ristolas. It flows generally west, through the Queyras. It is a left tributary of the Durance into which it flows at Guillestre.

== Communes along its course ==
This list is ordered from source to mouth: Ristolas, Abriès, Aiguilles, Château-Ville-Vieille, Arvieux, Eygliers, Guillestre
