= Punta Merciantaira =

Mountain in Italy

- Grand Glaiza
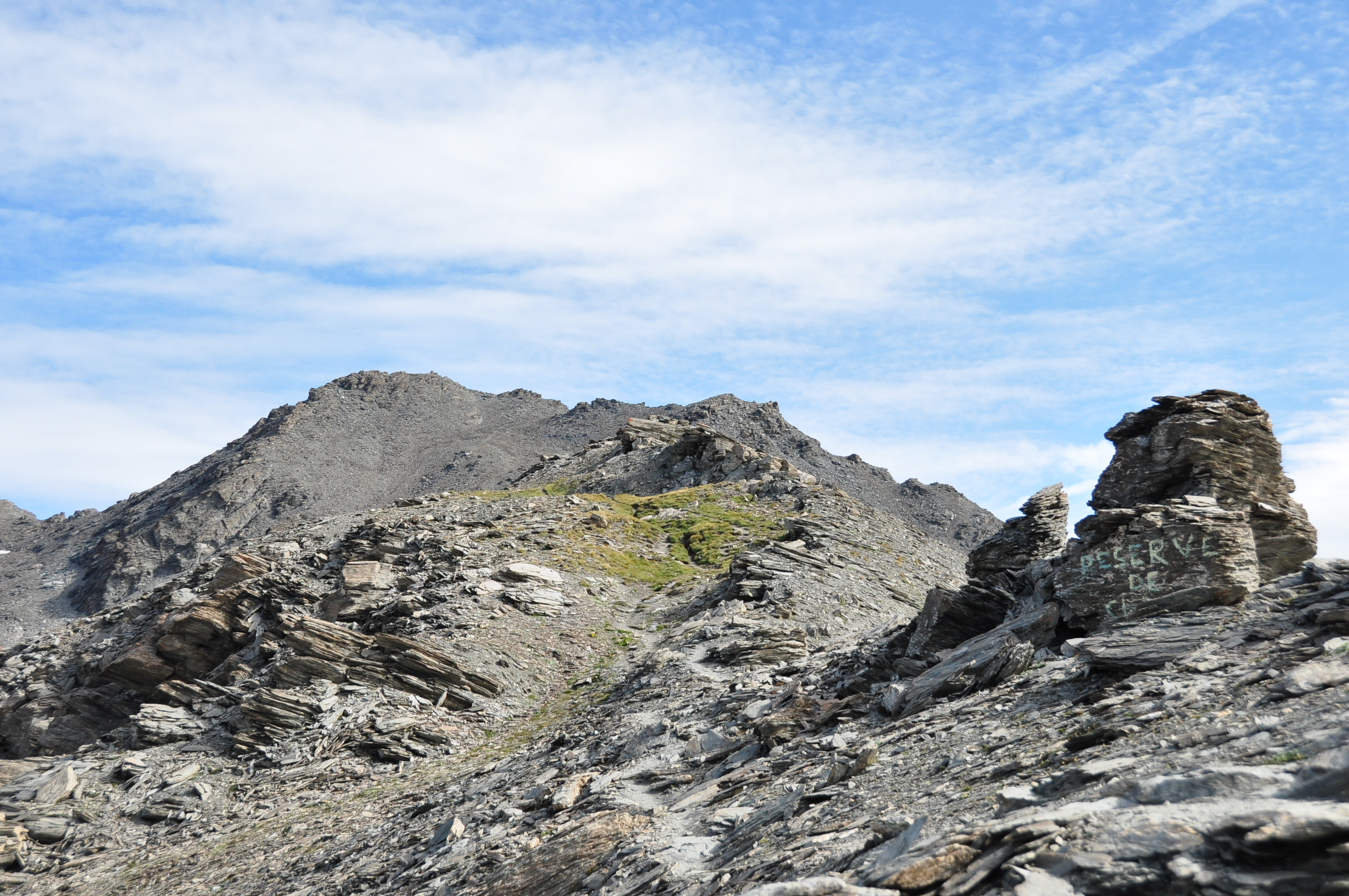
- The French side of the mountain

Highest point
- Elevation: 3,293 m (10,804 ft)
- Prominence: 479 m (1,572 ft)
- Isolation: 4.23 km (2.63 mi)
- Listing: Alpine mountains above 3000 m
- Coordinates: 44°50′57″N 6°52′57″E

Geography
- Location within Alps
- Location: Provence-Alpes-Côte d'Azur, France; Piemonte, Italy
- Parent range: Cottian Alps

Climbing
- Easiest route: Hike

The Punta Merciantaira (in Italian ) or Grand Glaiza (in French) is a 3,293 metres high mountain of the Cottian Alps.

== Geography ==
The peak is located on the French-Italian border between the Metropolitan City of Turin (Piedmont) and the French department of Hautes-Alpes (Provence-Alpes-Côte-d'Azur). It belongs to the Main chain of the Alps. Administratively the mountain is part of the Italian comune of Cesana Torinese (north face) and the French commune of Cervières.

=== SOIUSA classification ===
According to SOIUSA (International Standardized Mountain Subdivision of the Alps) the mountain can be classified in the following way:

- main part = Western Alps
- major sector = South Western Alps
- section = Cottian Alps
- subsection = Central Cottian Alps
- supergroup = Catena Bric Froid-Rochebrune-Beal Traversier
- group = Gruppo Ramière-Merciantaira
- subgroup = Sottogruppo del Merciantaira
- code = I/A-4.II-B.4.b

== Access to the summit ==
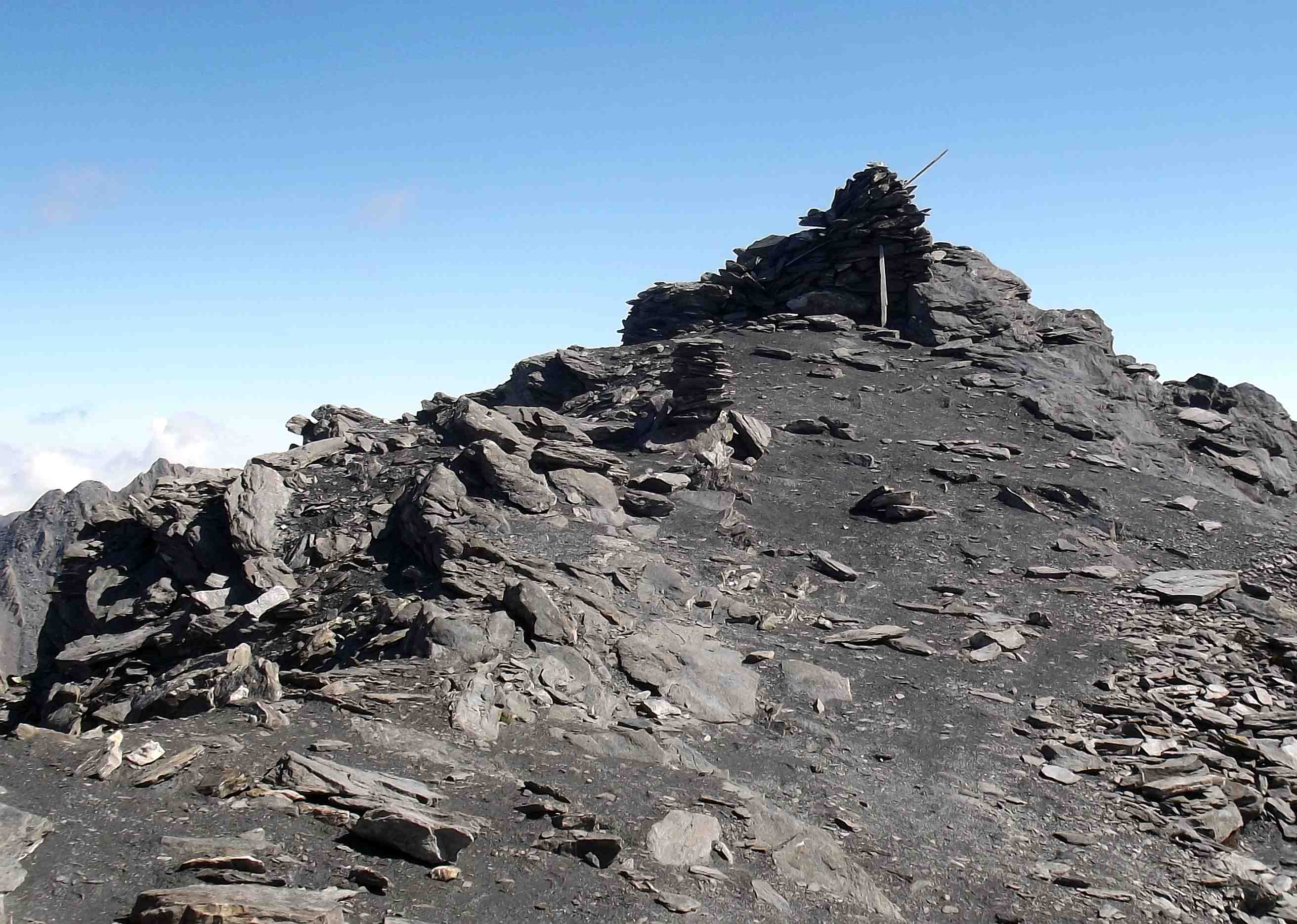
Mountain top.

The summit of the Grand Glaiza can be easily accessed starting from Les Fonts (commune of Cervières) in less than 4 hours' walk following a waymarked footpath. The easiest route from the Italian side, starting from Grange di Thuras (Cesana Torinese), is longer and requires a good hiking experience.

== Maps ==
- Italian official cartography (Istituto Geografico Militare - IGM); on-line version: www.pcn.minambiente.it
- French official cartography (Institut géographique national - IGN); on-line version: www.geoportail.fr
- Istituto Geografico Centrale - Carta dei sentieri e dei rifugi scala 1:50.000 n. 1 Valli di Susa Chisone e Germanasca

== Related articles ==
- France–Italy border
