= Clarée =

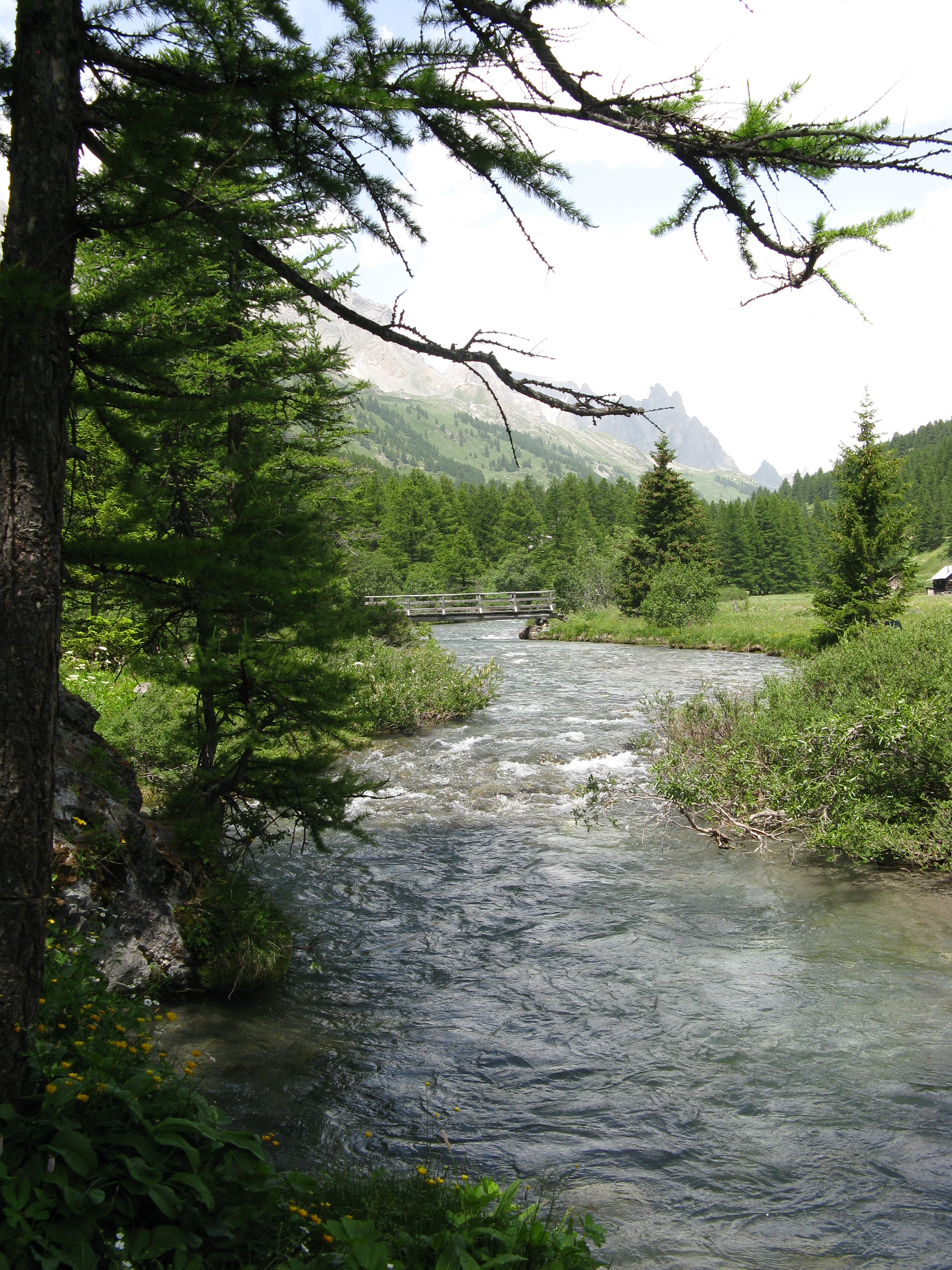

- Location within France Location within Provence-Alpes-Côte d'Azur

Location
- Country: France

Physical characteristics
- Source
  - location: Cottian Alps
  - elevation: 2,200 m (7,200 ft)
- Mouth
  - location: Durance
  - coordinates: 44.9246°N 6.6795°E
- Length: 32 km (20 mi)
- Basin size: 189 km^{2} (73 sq mi)

Basin features
- Progression: Durance→ Rhône→ Mediterranean Sea

The Clarée is a river in southeastern France, a right tributary to the Durance. It is 31.9 km (19.8 mi) long. Its drainage basin is 189 km^{2} (73 sq mi). Its source is in the Cottian Alps, near Mont Thabor and Valloire. It flows for all of its course in the Hautes-Alpes department. Its confluence with the Durance is near the hamlet of Les Alberts not far from the source of the Durance in the ski resort of Montgenevre.

The upper reaches of the river are in a military exercise range. This is where the French army from their base in Briançon train in the mountains.

== Tourism ==
In the summer the Vallée de la Clarée is visited by cyclists, walkers and horse riders. The river is used for water sports especially in spring as the snow melts. There are sections of white water, which are used by kayaks and white water rafts. There is a dramatic waterfall at Fontcouverte.

== Settlements ==
The settlements along the Clarée include:

- Névache:
- Plampinet
- Le Serre
- Val-des-Prés
- Le Rosier
- Les Alberts

== See also ==
- Vallée de la Clarée
