= Vallée de la Clarée =

Valley in France

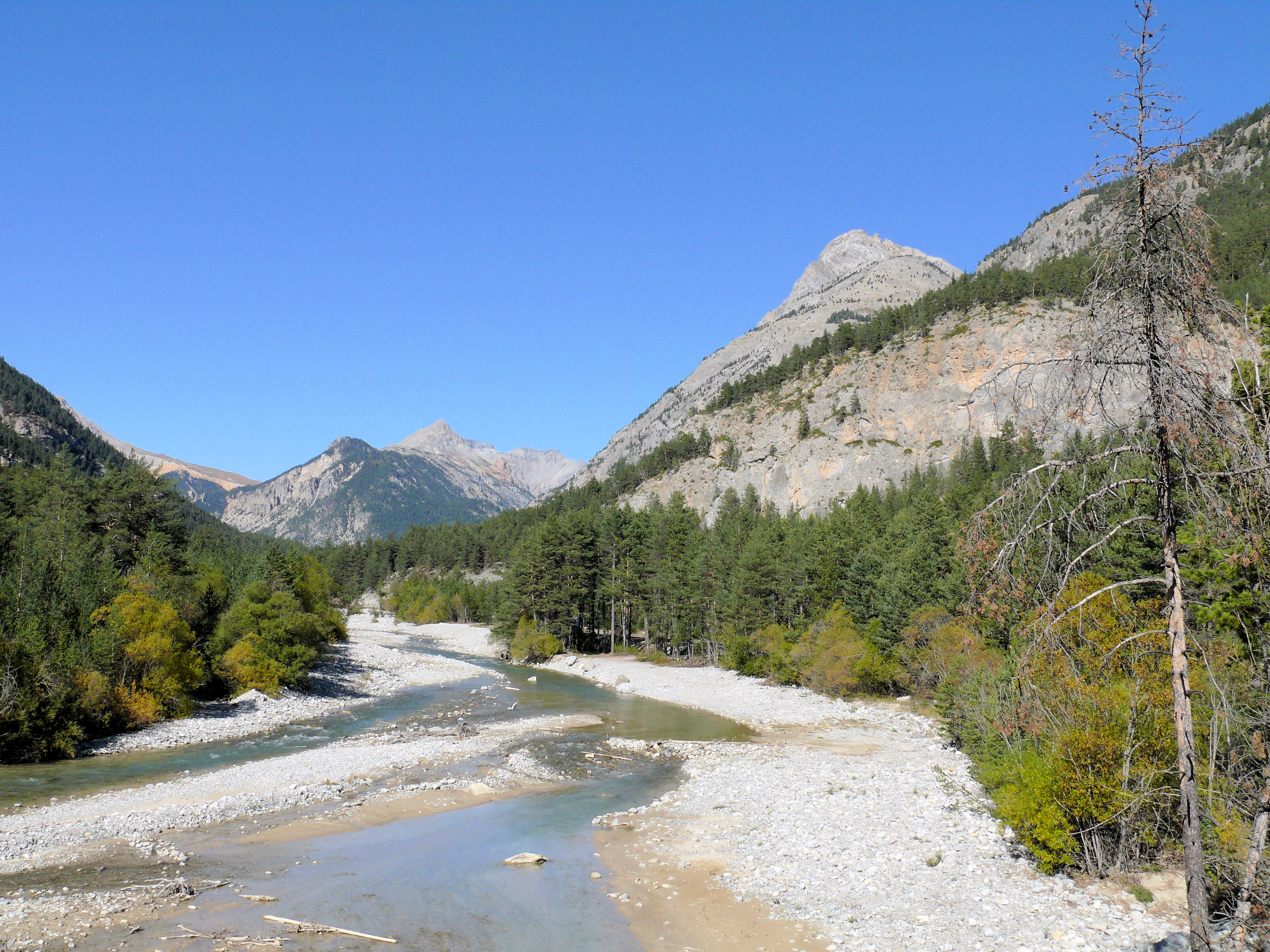
- View of the Vallée de la Clarée

- Location within France
- Floor elevation: 1,400–2,000 m (4,600–6,600 ft)
- Length: 33 km (21 mi) south east

Geology
- Type: Glacial valley

Geography
- Location: Hautes-Alpes, Provence-Alpes-Côte d'Azur, France
- Coordinates: 44.9667°N 6.6667°E
- Interactive map of Vallée de la Clarée

The Vallée de la Clarée is a scenic valley in the French Alps near to Montgenèvre, Briançon and the French-Italian border. The Clarée river runs through the valley.

The mountains on either side are part of the Massif des Cerces. To the west they are between 2800 and 2900m high, while on the east side they are between 2300 and 2400m high. Consequently, the snow is slow to melt and gives rise to the name of the central commune Névache meaning "snowed".

The valley lies at between 1400 and 2000m and contains meadows and larch forest. This alpine situation creates great biological diversity with several different habitats such as flooded soils and peat. These valleys contain 39% of known plant species in the French Alps, and 61% of those in the arrondissement of Briançon.

The Vallée de la Clarée and the adjoining Vallée Etroite cover 26,000 hectares and contain famous hiking trails (GR 57, Tour du Mont Thabor, Grande Traversée des Alpes). The valleys are exceptional area in that they have been preserved in their natural state. Agriculture, forestry and the rearing of livestock are still carried out traditionally.

Consequently, the valley is one of the most visited parts of the Hautes-Alpes department. Visitors have been estimated at 600,000 visits per year. As a result, and as a result of the campaign led by Émilie Carles, the valleys have been given the status of protected areas since 1992. In the summer the valley is visited by cyclists and walkers and by riders who use the large stables in Les Alberts.

The river is used for water sports especially in spring as the snow melts. There are sections of white water, which are used by kayaks and white water rafts. There is a dramatic waterfall at Fontcouverte.

The valley in winter is covered in snow, which is enjoyed by many cross-country skiers. There are over 65 km of trails. It has one of the main circuits where the French cross-country team train. Although it is popular for cross-country ski-ing, the valley's protected status has prevented ski-lifts being installed.

The valley is famous for its numerous sun-dials.

== Access ==
The valley is accessible by car via the Col de Montgenevre from Briançon in the summer or over the Col de l'Echelle from Bardonecchia (Italy). In July and August is the highest part of the valley is closed to motorised transport. Only a shuttle is allowed to take tourists to the Refuge de Laval at 2000m.

== Places and monuments ==
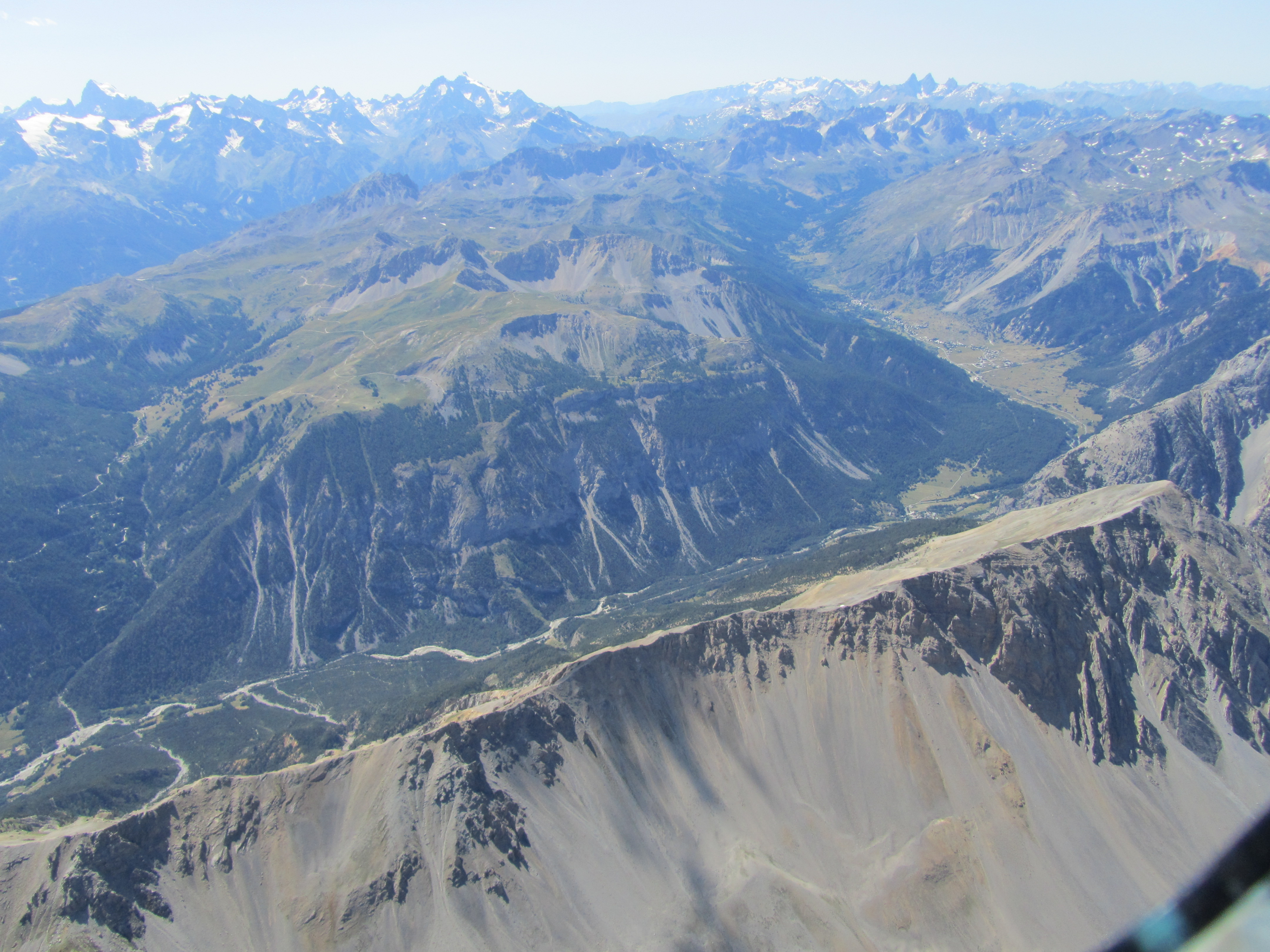
Vallée de la Clarée (taken from 3,500 m altitude)

- Col de l'Echelle
- Le Rosier
- Nevache
- Plampinet
- Val-des-Pres
