= Arrondissements of the Hautes-Alpes department =

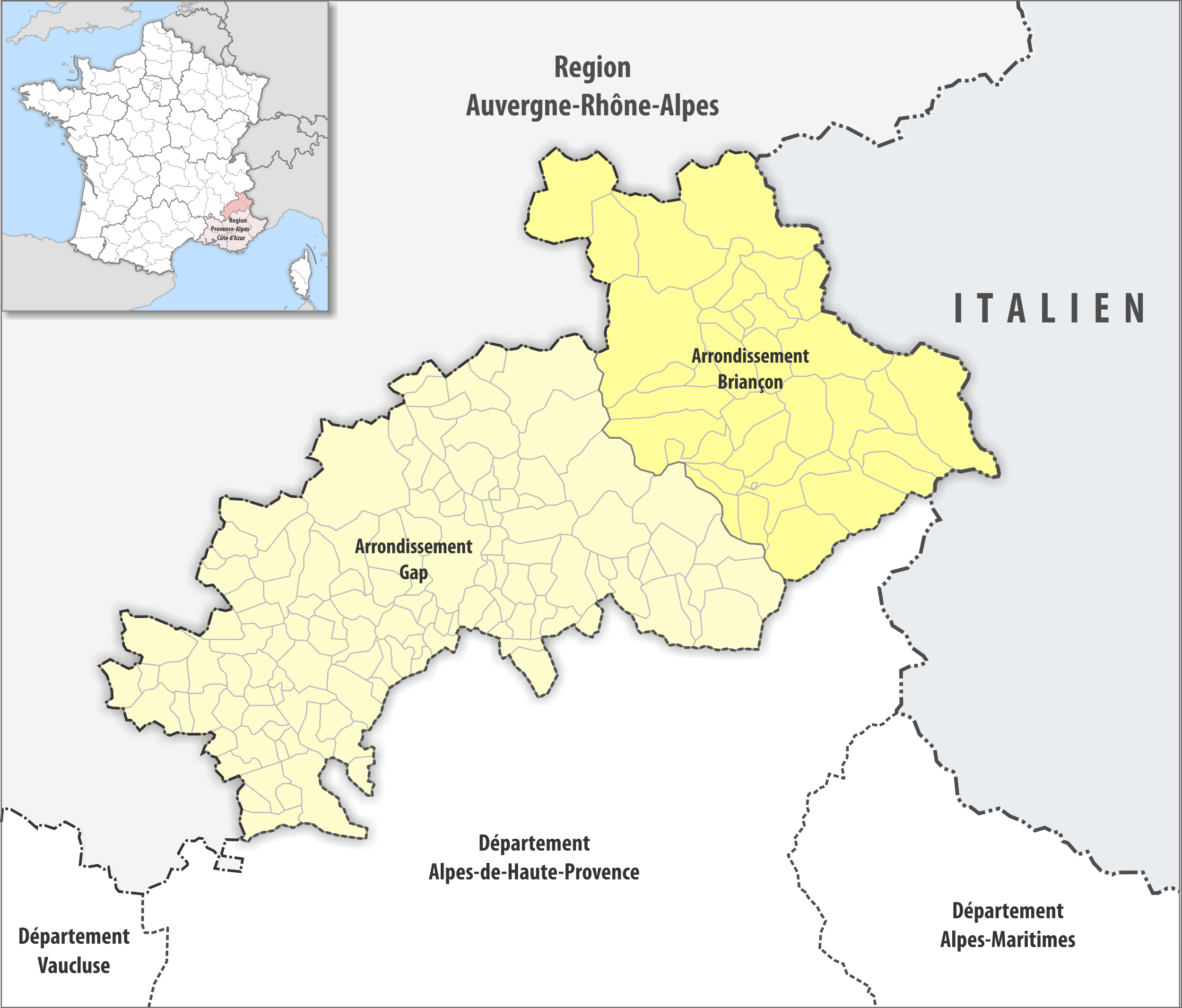
Map of arrondissements of the Hautes-Alpes department.

The 2 arrondissements of the Hautes-Alpes department are:

1. Arrondissement of Briançon, (subprefecture: Briançon) with 36 communes. The population of the arrondissement was 33,304 in 2021.
2. Arrondissement of Gap, (prefecture of the Hautes-Alpes department: Gap) with 126 communes. The population of the arrondissement was 107,672 in 2021.

== History ==
In 1800 the arrondissements of Gap, Briançon and Embrun were established. The arrondissement of Embrun was disbanded in 1926.
