= Canton of Briançon-2 =

Coordinates: 44°53′47″N 6°38′08″E

Briançon-2
- Canton
- Country: France
- Region: Provence-Alpes-Côte d'Azur
- Department: Hautes-Alpes
- No. of communes: {{{nbcomm}}}
- Population (2023): 10,747
- INSEE code: 05 03

The canton of Briançon-2 (before March 2015: Briançon-Nord) is an administrative division in southeastern France. It consists of the eastern part of the commune of Briançon (a larger part than in the former canton of Briançon-Nord) and its northeastern suburbs. It includes the following communes:

- Briançon (partly)
- Montgenèvre
- Névache
- Val-des-Prés

== Demographics ==
Historical population
Year	Pop.	±% p.a.
2013	11,215	—
2018	10,858	−0.64%
Source: INSEE

== See also ==
- Cantons of the Hautes-Alpes department
