= Émilie Carles =

French writer and activist (1900–1979)

- Born: Marie Julie Émilie Allais; 29 May 1900; Val-des-Prés
- Died: 29 July 1979 (aged 79); Val-des-Prés
- Occupations: Teacher and writer

Émilie Carles (29 May 1900 – 29 July 1979) was a French writer and activist.

== Biography ==
Marie Julie Émilie Allais was born in Val-des-Prés on 29 May 1900. Her parents were small farmers in a mountainous region. Her mother died when she was just four. Two of her brothers fought in the First World War. She became a pacifist as a result of their experiences. Carles was educated in a local school but travelled to Paris to complete her teaching diploma when she was sixteen. She returned home and taught in various schools in the area.

in 1927 she met Jean Carles who became her husband. They were pacifists and feminists. The couple had two sons and a daughter. In 1936 they transformed their home in Val-des-Prés into a holiday inn for workers from the city. Their income continued to be supported by Carles' teaching salary. They experienced a tragedy during the Second World War when their daughter was killed in a pedestrian traffic accident with a military truck. Though Jean Carles was entitled to a military pension as a veteran of World War I, he refused it and refused to fight in the Second World War. To avoid being arrested as a deserter, he spent most of the war in hiding. He died in 1962.

Carles wrote an autobiography which detailed her life. The book became a huge success selling millions of copies and being translated into numerous languages. It was made into a TV movie in 1997. When she died on 29 July 1979 Carles donated her body to science.

=== Protection of the Vallée de la Clarée ===
During the 1970s Carles discovered there were plans to build a highway through the Vallée de la Clarée. Believing the road would cause irreparable damage to the environment and the valley she launched a campaign to get the valley protected. Posters, leaflets, petitions and hearings took place. She led a demonstration on 13 August 1974 to Briançon which included 13 tractors and about 300 people at the height of harvest season. In October 1975 there was a press conference in Paris. By 1976, the highway project was abandoned. In July 1992 the valley was reclassified to protect it from future projects.
