= Névache =

- Commune
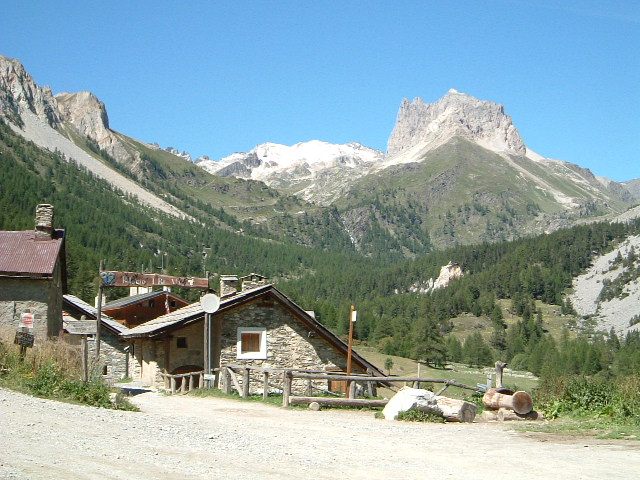
- A narrow valley in Névache

- Coat of arms
- Location of Névache
- Location within France Location within Provence-Alpes-Côte d'Azur
- Coordinates: 45°01′11″N 6°36′19″E
- Country: France
- Region: Provence-Alpes-Côte d'Azur
- Department: Hautes-Alpes
- Arrondissement: Briançon
- Canton: Briançon-2
- Intercommunality: Briançonnais

Government
  - Mayor (2026–32): Alain Burgevin
- Area^{1}: 191.93 km^{2} (74.10 sq mi)
- Elevation: 1,596 m (5,236 ft)
- Highest elevation: 3,222 m (10,571 ft)
- Lowest elevation: 1,430 m (4,690 ft)
- Population (2023): 362
  - Density: 1.89/km^{2} (4.88/sq mi)
- Time zone: UTC+01:00 (CET)
  - Summer (DST): UTC+02:00 (CEST)
- INSEE/Postal code: 05093 /05100
- ^{1} French Land Register data, which excludes lakes, ponds, glaciers > 1 km^{2} (0.386 sq mi or 247 acres) and river estuaries.

Névache (French pronunciation: [nevaʃ]; Occitan: Nevascha [neˈvastʃɔ, neˈvaːtsɔ]) is a commune in the Hautes-Alpes department in southeastern France.

== Geography ==
It is situated in the Vallée de la Clarée.

=== Climate ===
Névache has a humid continental climate (Köppen climate classification Dfb). The average annual temperature in Névache is 5.0 °C (41.0 °F). The average annual rainfall is 762.1 mm (30.00 in) with October as the wettest month. The temperatures are highest on average in July, at around 14.1 °C (57.4 °F), and lowest in January, at around −3.5 °C (25.7 °F). The highest temperature ever recorded in Névache was 32.5 °C (90.5 °F) on 30 July 1983; the coldest temperature ever recorded was −27.3 °C (−17.1 °F) on 15 January 1966.

Climate data for Névache (1981–2010 averages, extremes 1961−2008)
Month	Jan	Feb	Mar	Apr	May	Jun	Jul	Aug	Sep	Oct	Nov	Dec	Year
Record high °C (°F)	14.0 (57.2)	15.0 (59.0)	18.0 (64.4)	21.0 (69.8)	25.3 (77.5)	29.1 (84.4)	32.5 (90.5)	30.5 (86.9)	28.8 (83.8)	25.0 (77.0)	21.0 (69.8)	15.5 (59.9)	32.5 (90.5)
Mean daily maximum °C (°F)	2.5 (36.5)	4.1 (39.4)	6.7 (44.1)	9.4 (48.9)	14.4 (57.9)	18.8 (65.8)	22.2 (72.0)	22.1 (71.8)	17.7 (63.9)	12.8 (55.0)	6.7 (44.1)	2.8 (37.0)	11.7 (53.1)
Daily mean °C (°F)	−3.5 (25.7)	−2.9 (26.8)	0.3 (32.5)	3.2 (37.8)	7.9 (46.2)	11.3 (52.3)	14.1 (57.4)	14.0 (57.2)	10.3 (50.5)	6.3 (43.3)	0.9 (33.6)	−2.6 (27.3)	5.0 (41.0)
Mean daily minimum °C (°F)	−9.4 (15.1)	−10.0 (14.0)	−6.0 (21.2)	−3.0 (26.6)	1.4 (34.5)	3.9 (39.0)	5.9 (42.6)	5.9 (42.6)	3.0 (37.4)	−0.2 (31.6)	−5.0 (23.0)	−7.9 (17.8)	−1.7 (28.9)
Record low °C (°F)	−27.3 (−17.1)	−24.2 (−11.6)	−26.0 (−14.8)	−17.1 (1.2)	−11.2 (11.8)	−8.7 (16.3)	−4.5 (23.9)	−6.0 (21.2)	−9.6 (14.7)	−15.0 (5.0)	−20.0 (−4.0)	−26.0 (−14.8)	−27.5 (−17.5)
Average precipitation mm (inches)	59.3 (2.33)	44.5 (1.75)	48.8 (1.92)	70.4 (2.77)	74.7 (2.94)	65.7 (2.59)	50.0 (1.97)	52.6 (2.07)	72.5 (2.85)	88.6 (3.49)	68.0 (2.68)	67.0 (2.64)	762.1 (30.00)
Average precipitation days (≥ 1.0 mm)	7.5	5.9	7.1	8.7	10.2	9.1	6.7	7.7	7.2	8.8	8.0	8.3	95.3
Source: Meteociel

Climate data for Névache (1991–2020 averages): elevation 1603m
Month	Jan	Feb	Mar	Apr	May	Jun	Jul	Aug	Sep	Oct	Nov	Dec	Year
Mean daily maximum °C (°F)	2.4 (36.3)	4.3 (39.7)	7.3 (45.1)	9.7 (49.5)	14.9 (58.8)	19.3 (66.7)	21.9 (71.4)	22.2 (72.0)	17.1 (62.8)	12.4 (54.3)	6.4 (43.5)	2.5 (36.5)	11.7 (53.1)
Daily mean °C (°F)	−3.5 (25.7)	−2.7 (27.1)	1.1 (34.0)	3.5 (38.3)	8.5 (47.3)	12.0 (53.6)	14.2 (57.6)	14.3 (57.7)	10.1 (50.2)	6.3 (43.3)	0.9 (33.6)	−2.8 (27.0)	5.2 (41.3)
Mean daily minimum °C (°F)	−9.3 (15.3)	−9.6 (14.7)	−5.2 (22.6)	−2.7 (27.1)	2.1 (35.8)	4.7 (40.5)	6.4 (43.5)	6.5 (43.7)	3.1 (37.6)	0.2 (32.4)	−4.6 (23.7)	−8 (18)	−1.4 (29.6)
Average precipitation mm (inches)	61.0 (2.40)	43.2 (1.70)	50.3 (1.98)	62.9 (2.48)	75.8 (2.98)	65.5 (2.58)	54.6 (2.15)	54.4 (2.14)	70.7 (2.78)	94.4 (3.72)	97.7 (3.85)	74.0 (2.91)	804.5 (31.67)
Source: Météo-France

== Administration ==
- unknown–2014: Georges Pouchot-Rougeblanc
- 2014–2020: Jean-Louis Chevalier
- 2020–2026: Claudine Morrier-Chretien
- 2026–incumbent: Alain Burgevin

== Population ==
Historical population
Year	Pop.	±% p.a.
1968	128	—
1975	119	−1.04%
1982	191	+6.99%
1990	245	+3.16%
1999	290	+1.89%
2007	326	+1.47%
2012	366	+2.34%
2017	356	−0.55%
2023	362	+0.28%
Source: INSEE

== Economy ==
In the winter months cross-country skiing is a popular activity. Other than tourism the main industry is cattle farming.

== See also ==
- Communes of the Hautes-Alpes department
