= Val-des-Prés =

- Commune
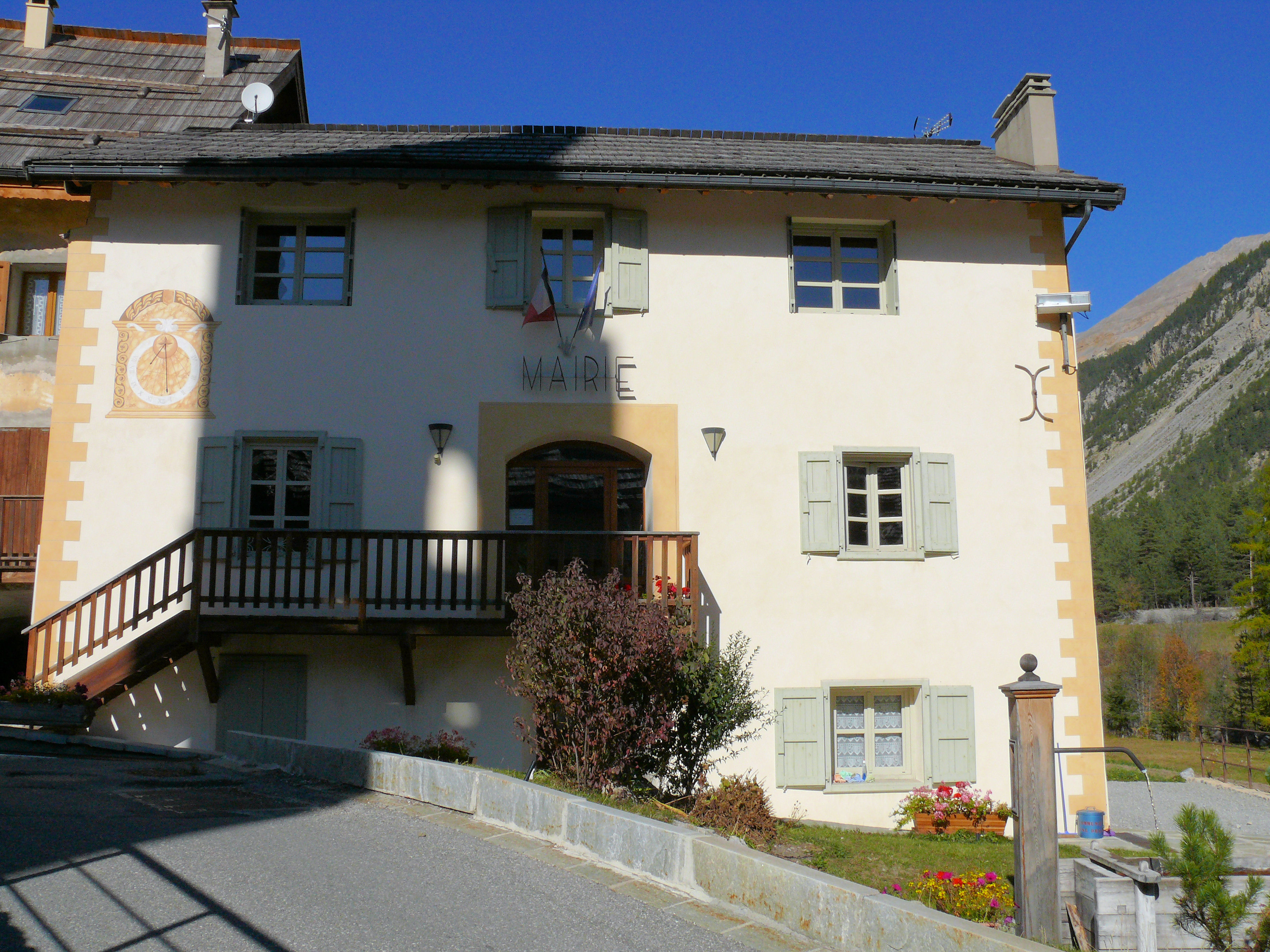
- The town hall in the hamlet of Serre, in Val-des-Prés

- Coat of arms
- Location of Val-des-Prés
- Location within France Location within Provence-Alpes-Côte d'Azur
- Coordinates: 44°56′57″N 6°40′45″E
- Country: France
- Region: Provence-Alpes-Côte d'Azur
- Department: Hautes-Alpes
- Arrondissement: Briançon
- Canton: Briançon-2
- Intercommunality: Briançonnais

Government
  - Mayor (2026–32): Émile Roman
- Area^{1}: 44.77 km^{2} (17.29 sq mi)
- Elevation: 1,370 m (4,490 ft)
- Highest elevation: 2,761 m (9,058 ft)
- Lowest elevation: 1,338 m (4,390 ft)
- Population (2023): 593
  - Density: 13.2/km^{2} (34.3/sq mi)
- Time zone: UTC+01:00 (CET)
  - Summer (DST): UTC+02:00 (CEST)
- INSEE/Postal code: 05174 /05100
- ^{1} French Land Register data, which excludes lakes, ponds, glaciers > 1 km^{2} (0.386 sq mi or 247 acres) and river estuaries.

Val-des-Prés (French pronunciation: [val de pʁe]; Occitan: Vau dels Prats) is a commune in the Hautes-Alpes department in southeastern France.

It is situated in the Clarée Valley.

== Population ==
Historical population
Year	Pop.	±% p.a.
1968	217	—
1975	276	+3.50%
1982	390	+5.06%
1990	479	+2.60%
1999	450	−0.69%
2007	486	+0.97%
2012	579	+3.56%
2017	641	+2.06%
2023	593	−1.29%
Source: INSEE

== Personalities ==
The village was the home of Émilie Carles who wrote her memoir A Wild Herb Soup (or A Life of her Own, original French: Une Soupe aux herbes sauvages) (1977) describing life in the village in the early and mid 20th century.

== See also ==
- Communes of the Hautes-Alpes department
