= Briançon =

- Subprefecture and commune
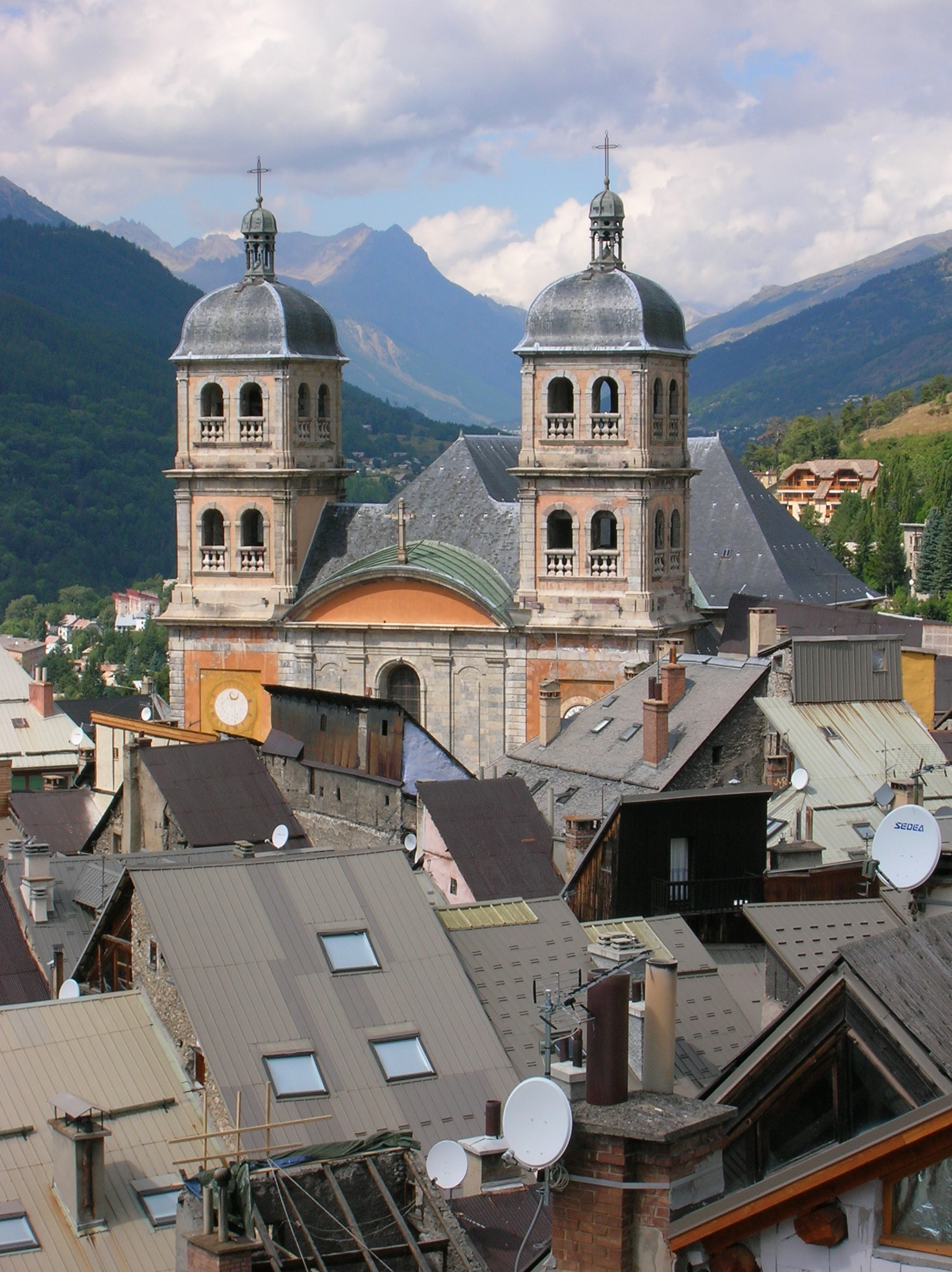
- A view of the Collegiate Church of Notre-Dame and Saint-Nicolas

- Coat of arms
- Location of Briançon
- Location within France Location within Provence-Alpes-Côte d'Azur
- Coordinates: 44°53′47″N 6°38′08″E
- Country: France
- Region: Provence-Alpes-Côte d'Azur
- Department: Hautes-Alpes
- Arrondissement: Briançon
- Canton: Briançon-1 and 2
- Intercommunality: Briançonnais

Government
  - Mayor (2026–32): Arnaud Murgia (DVD)
- Area^{1}: 28.07 km^{2} (10.84 sq mi)
- Highest elevation: 2,540 m (8,330 ft)
- Lowest elevation: 1,167 m (3,829 ft)
- Population (2023): 11,411
  - Density: 406.5/km^{2} (1,053/sq mi)
- Time zone: UTC+01:00 (CET)
  - Summer (DST): UTC+02:00 (CEST)
- INSEE/Postal code: 05023 /05100
- Website: www.ville-briancon.fr
- ^{1} French Land Register data, which excludes lakes, ponds, glaciers > 1 km^{2} (0.386 sq mi or 247 acres) and river estuaries.

Briançon (French: [bʁijɑ̃sɔ̃], Occitan: [bɾjanˈsun]) is the sole subprefecture of the Hautes-Alpes department in the Provence-Alpes-Côte d'Azur region in Southeastern France. It is the highest city in France at an altitude of 1,326 metres (4,350 feet), based on the national definition as a community containing more than 2,000 inhabitants. It has about 11,000 inhabitants.

Briançon has been part of the Fortifications of Vauban UNESCO World Heritage Sites since they were established in 2008.

== History ==
Briançon was the Brigantium of the Romans and formed part of the kingdom of King Cottius. Brigantium was marked as the first place in Gallia after Alpis Cottia (Mont Genèvre). At Brigantium the road branched, to the west through Grenoble to Vienna (modern Vienne), on the Rhone; to the south through Ebrodunum (modern Embrun), to Vapincum (modern Gap). Both the Antonine Itinerary and the Table give the route from Brigantium to Vapincum. The Table places Brigantium 6 M.P. from Alpis Cottia. Strabo mentions the village Brigantium on a road to Alpis Cottia, but his words are obscure.

Ptolemy mentions Brigantium as within the limits of the Segusini, or people of Segusio (modern Susa), in Piedmont; but it seems, as D'Anville observes, to be beyond the natural limits of the Segusini. Walckenaer (vol. i. p. 540) justifies Ptolemy in this matter by supposing that he follows a description of Italy made before the new divisions of Augustus, which we know from Pliny. Walckenaer also supports his justification of Ptolemy by the Jerusalem Itinerary, which makes the Alpes Cottiae commence at Rama (near modern La Roche-de-Rame) between Embrun and Briançon.

In the 1040s it came into the hands of the counts of Albon and thenceforth shared the fate of the Dauphiné. The Briançonnais included not only the upper valley of the Durance (with those of its affluents, the Gyronde and the Guil) but also the valley of the Dora Riparia (Césanne, Oulx, Bardonnèche and Exilles) and that of the Chisone (Fénestrelles, Pérouse, Pragelas). The glens all lay on the eastern slope of the chain of the Alps. However the Treaty of Utrecht (1713) handed all of those valleys to Savoy in exchange for that of Barcelonnette, on the west slope of the Alps. In 1815 Briançon successfully withstood a siege of three months at the hands of the Allies, a feat commemorated by an inscription on one of its gates, Le passé répond de l'avenir ("The past guarantees the future").

== Demographics ==
Historical population

Year	Pop.	±% p.a.
1793	3,023	—
1800	2,666	−1.78%
1806	2,945	+1.67%
1821	2,835	−0.25%
1831	2,939	+0.36%
1836	3,455	+3.29%
1841	4,301	+4.48%
1846	4,309	+0.04%
1851	4,439	+0.60%
1856	4,601	+0.72%
1861	4,510	−0.40%
1866	3,579	−4.52%
1872	4,169	+2.58%
1876	4,491	+1.88%
1881	5,439	+3.90%
1886	5,777	+1.21%
1891	6,580	+2.64%
1896	7,177	+1.75%
1901	7,426	+0.68%

Year	Pop.	±% p.a.
1906	7,524	+0.26%
1911	7,888	+0.95%
1921	5,013	−4.43%
1926	5,636	+2.37%
1931	6,822	+3.89%
1936	7,543	+2.03%
1946	6,671	−1.22%
1954	8,274	+2.73%
1962	7,570	−1.11%
1968	8,215	+1.37%
1975	9,489	+2.08%
1982	9,710	+0.33%
1990	11,041	+1.62%
1999	10,737	−0.31%
2007	11,604	+0.98%
2012	12,301	+1.17%
2017	11,625	−1.12%
2023	11,411	−0.31%

Source: EHESS and INSEE (1968–2023)

== Geography ==
Briançon is located near the Italian border, in the Serre Chevalier ski area. It is built on a plateau centred on the confluence of the Durance and the Guisane rivers. Briançon station has rail connections to Gap, Marseille, Valence and Paris.

=== Climate ===
Due to its elevation, Briançon features a warm-summer humid continental climate (Köppen : Dfb), bordering on an oceanic climate (Cfb) under the Köppen system. Summers are warm with cool nights, and winters are cold and snowy.

Climate data for Briançon (1981–2005 averages, extremes 1966–2005)
Month	Jan	Feb	Mar	Apr	May	Jun	Jul	Aug	Sep	Oct	Nov	Dec	Year
Record high °C (°F)	17.0 (62.6)	17.2 (63.0)	21.4 (70.5)	22.9 (73.2)	29.4 (84.9)	31.8 (89.2)	34.3 (93.7)	33.3 (91.9)	30.2 (86.4)	27.6 (81.7)	22.8 (73.0)	18.3 (64.9)	34.3 (93.7)
Mean daily maximum °C (°F)	5.0 (41.0)	5.9 (42.6)	9.8 (49.6)	11.6 (52.9)	16.9 (62.4)	21.4 (70.5)	24.8 (76.6)	24.6 (76.3)	19.8 (67.6)	14.4 (57.9)	8.6 (47.5)	5.5 (41.9)	14.1 (57.4)
Daily mean °C (°F)	0.0 (32.0)	0.6 (33.1)	4.0 (39.2)	6.2 (43.2)	11.0 (51.8)	14.8 (58.6)	17.7 (63.9)	17.5 (63.5)	13.5 (56.3)	9.0 (48.2)	3.8 (38.8)	1.0 (33.8)	8.3 (46.9)
Mean daily minimum °C (°F)	−5.0 (23.0)	−5.0 (23.0)	−1.7 (28.9)	0.9 (33.6)	5.2 (41.4)	8.1 (46.6)	10.5 (50.9)	10.4 (50.7)	7.2 (45.0)	3.7 (38.7)	−1.0 (30.2)	−3.6 (25.5)	2.6 (36.7)
Record low °C (°F)	−17.9 (−0.2)	−17.4 (0.7)	−18.4 (−1.1)	−10.7 (12.7)	−5.7 (21.7)	−0.2 (31.6)	2.4 (36.3)	1.4 (34.5)	−4.0 (24.8)	−8.1 (17.4)	−12.5 (9.5)	−16.9 (1.6)	−18.4 (−1.1)
Average precipitation mm (inches)	58.5 (2.30)	39.3 (1.55)	46.8 (1.84)	71.3 (2.81)	67.3 (2.65)	68.9 (2.71)	51.5 (2.03)	54.4 (2.14)	72.0 (2.83)	99.0 (3.90)	69.9 (2.75)	60.2 (2.37)	759.1 (29.89)
Average precipitation days (≥ 1.0 mm)	6.9	5.2	5.8	8.6	9.4	8.7	6.9	6.9	6.8	9.6	7.0	7.2	89.0
Mean monthly sunshine hours	149.7	164.8	207.4	180.9	207.6	232.7	253.7	230.1	192.2	156.6	130.8	126.2	2,232.6
Source: Meteo France

== Sights ==
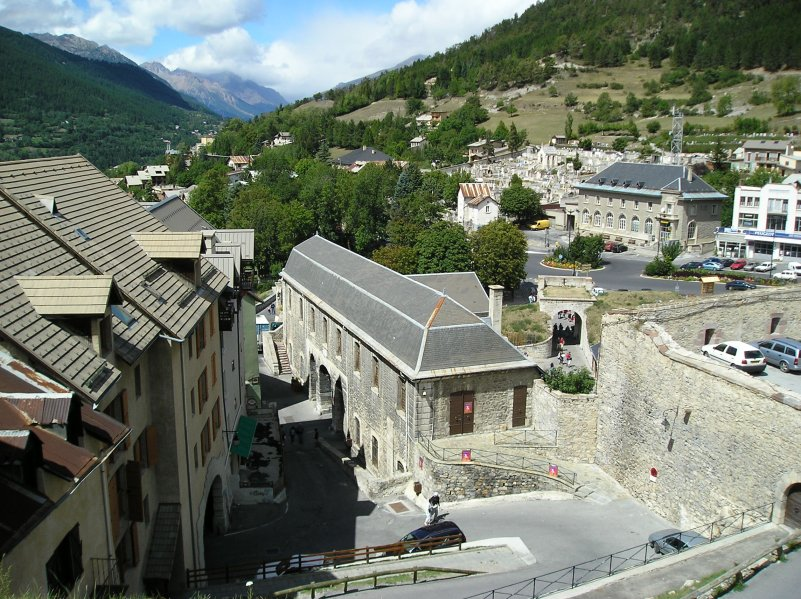
The citadel of Briançon

Aerial view of Fort des Têtes with the old town of Briançon in the background

The historical centre is a strongly fortified town, built by Vauban to defend the region from Austrians in the 17th century. Its streets are very steep and narrow, though picturesque. Briançon lies at the foot of the descent from the Col de Montgenèvre, giving access to Turin, so a great number of other fortifications have been constructed on the surrounding heights, especially towards the east. The Fort Janus is no less than 1,200 m. above the town.

The parish church, with its two towers, was built 1703–1726, and occupies a conspicuous position.

The Pont d'Asfeld, east of the town, was built in 1734, and forms an arch of 40 m span, thrown at a height of 56 m across the Durance.

The modern town extends in the plain at the southwest foot of the plateau on which the old town is built and forms the suburb of Ste Catherine.

Briançon is close to the Parc National des Ecrins and the Vallée de la Clarée.

On 8 July 2008, several buildings of Briançon were classified by the UNESCO as World Heritage Sites, as part of the "Fortifications of Vauban" group. These buildings are: the city walls, Redoute des Salettes, Fort des Trois-Têtes, Fort du Randouillet, ouvrage de la communication Y and the Asfeld Bridge. Along with Briançon, 11 other sites of fortified buildings in France were classified. Among them is the place-forte of Mont-Dauphin, also in the Hautes-Alpes department. These pieces of art were designed by Sébastien Le Prestre de Vauban (1633–1707), a military engineer of King Louis XIV.

== Notable people ==
The following people were either born in Briançon or lived there for a significant portion of their lives.

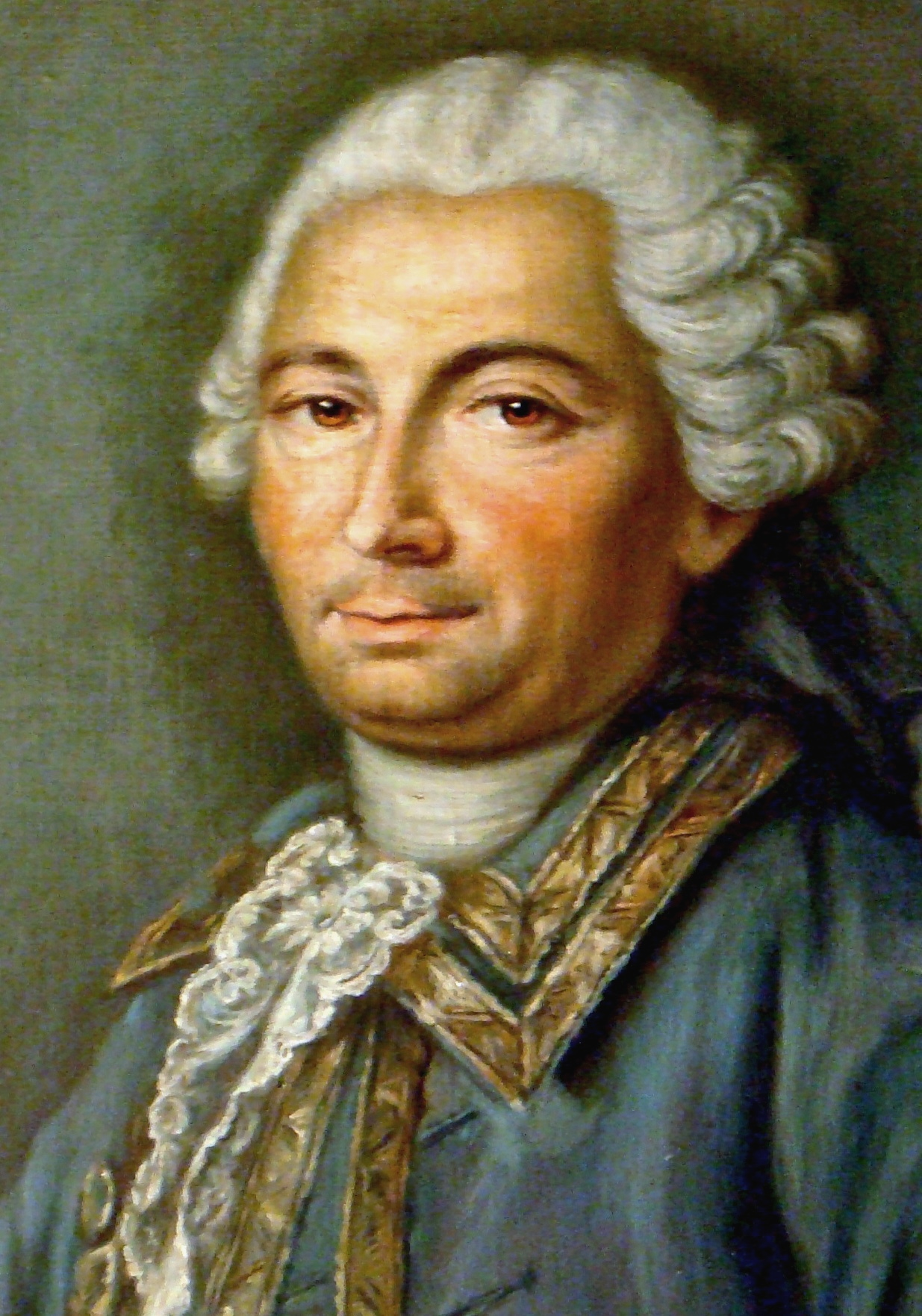
Jean-Antoine Morand, ca.1770

- Aymon de Briançon (died 1211) a Burgundian nobleman, Carthusian monk and Archbishop of Tarentaise
- Oronce Finé (1494–1555), mathematician and cartographer
- Jean-Antoine Morand (1727–1794), architect and urban planner, he was guillotined
- Augustin Chenu (1833–1875), painter, known for his local landscapes and hunting scenes.
- Albert Achard (1894–1972), a flying ace of the First World War
- Emilie Carles (1900–1979), a French writer and activist.
- Frédérique Lucien (born 1960), a visual artist, works in drawing, painting and ceramics.
- Jean-Christophe Keck (born 1964), musicologist, conductor and specialist on Jacques Offenbach
- Xavier Mortimer (born 1980), magician and variety performer in Las Vegas

=== Sport ===
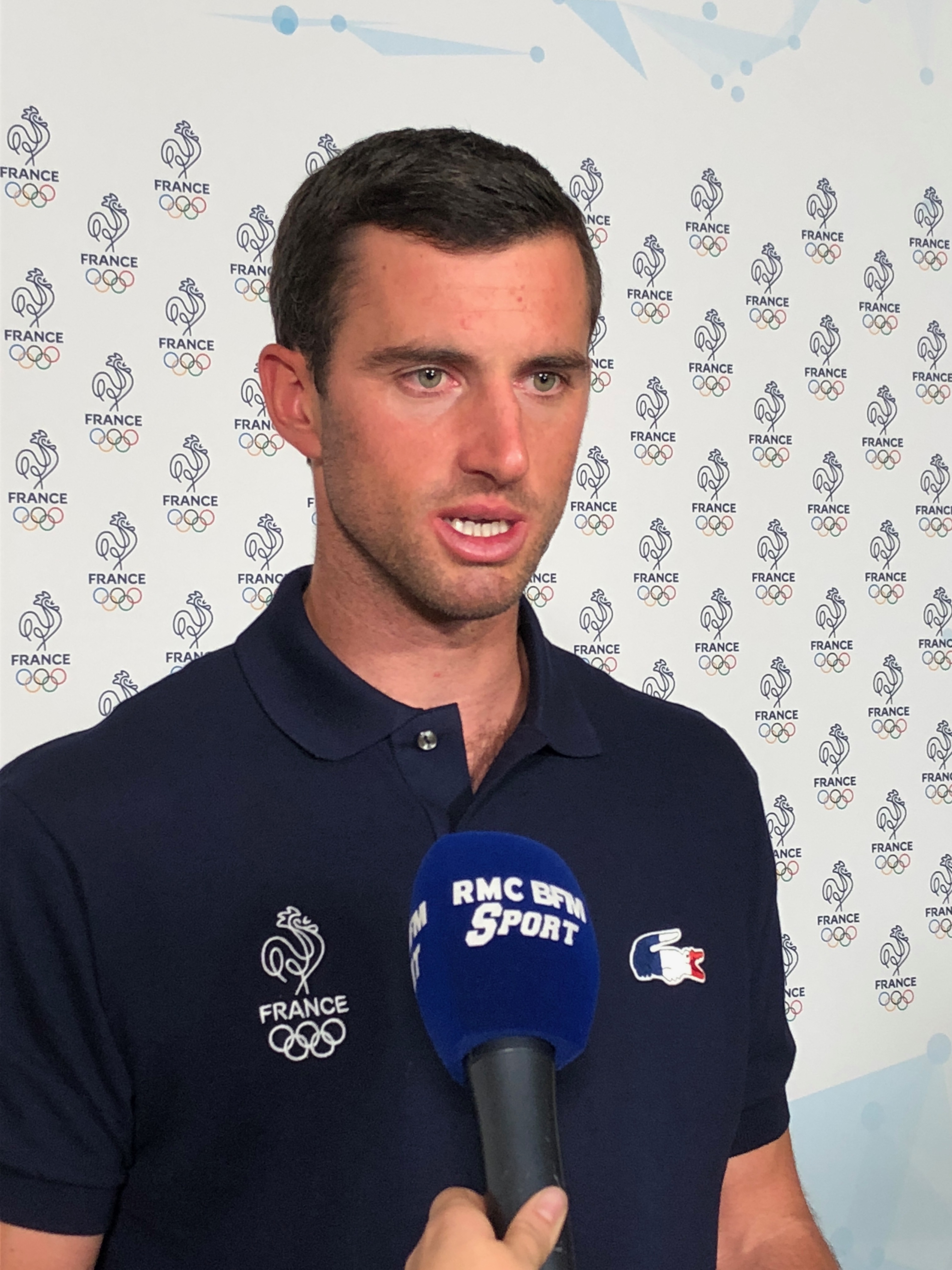
Pierre Vaultier, 2017

- Jules Melquiond (born 1941), Alpine ski racer
- Henry Bréchu (born 1947), Alpine ski racer
- Luc Alphand (born 1965), Alpine ski racer and a racing-car driver.
- Benjamin Melquiond (born 1975), Alpine ski racer
- Nicolas Bonnet (born 1984), ski mountaineer and runner.
- Pierre Vaultier (born 1987), a snowboard cross twice gold medallist at the 2014 and 2018 Winter Olympics
- Laure Barthélémy (born 1988), cross-country skier and soldier
- Richard Jouve (born 1994), cross-country skier, twice team bronze medallist at the 2018 and 2022 Winter Olympics

== International relations ==
Briançon is twinned with:

- Rosenheim, Germany
- Susa, Italy

== Sport ==
=== Cycling ===
Briançon has often hosted starts and finishes of stages of the Tour de France, Giro d'Italia and Dauphiné Libéré. In 2017 stage 18 of the Tour de France started here.

As Briançon has regularly featured as a stage town in the Tour de France, it is a popular base for cyclists. Since 1947, the town has been the start point for a stage of the Tour 22 times, and has also been a stage finish 22 times.

In 2007, the town was the finish of the 159.5 km (99.1 mi) stage 9 on 17 July from Val-d'Isère crossing the Col de l'Iseran, the Col du Télégraphe and the Col du Galibier with a 37 km (23 mi) downhill finish to Briançon.

=== Ice hockey ===
The Diables Rouges de Briançon play in the Ligue Magnus, the French top league.

=== Kayaking ===
Briançon is situated around the confluence of the Durance river and its tributary the Guisane which are fed with snow melt in the Spring. Tourists come from around Europe to kayak and raft on the resultant whitewater rivers and their tributaries, including the Onde, the Gyronde, the Guil, the Rabioux, the Ubaye and others; often basing themselves in Briançon.

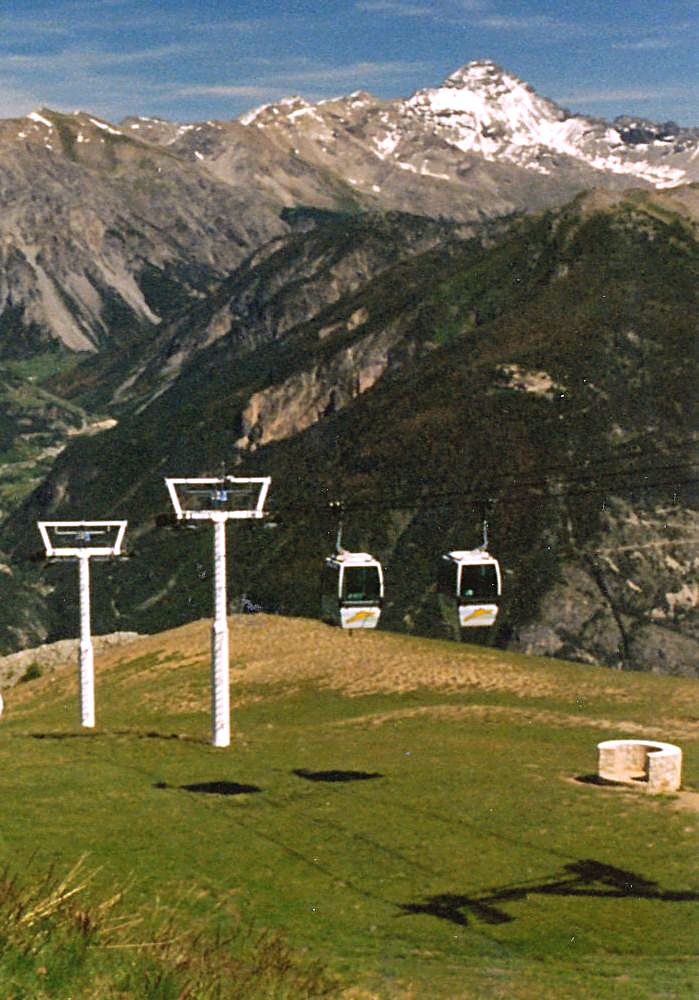
The Prorel cable car goes to the summit of Mont Prorel.

Popular white water rivers in the Alps are mainly medium volume glacier-fed rivers with long continuous rapids and few big drops. The season is short (two or three months in early summer when the snow and glaciers are melting) but the whitewater is reliable during this period.

=== Skiing ===
Briançon is the base and lowest altitude station of the large Serre Chevalier ski resort. Most of the city's accommodation is used exclusively in winter, the population tripling during that period.

== See also ==
- Communes of the Hautes-Alpes department
