= Hautes-Alpes =

Department in Provence-Alpes-Côte d'Azur, France

Hautes-Alpes Auts Aups (Occitan)
- Department of France
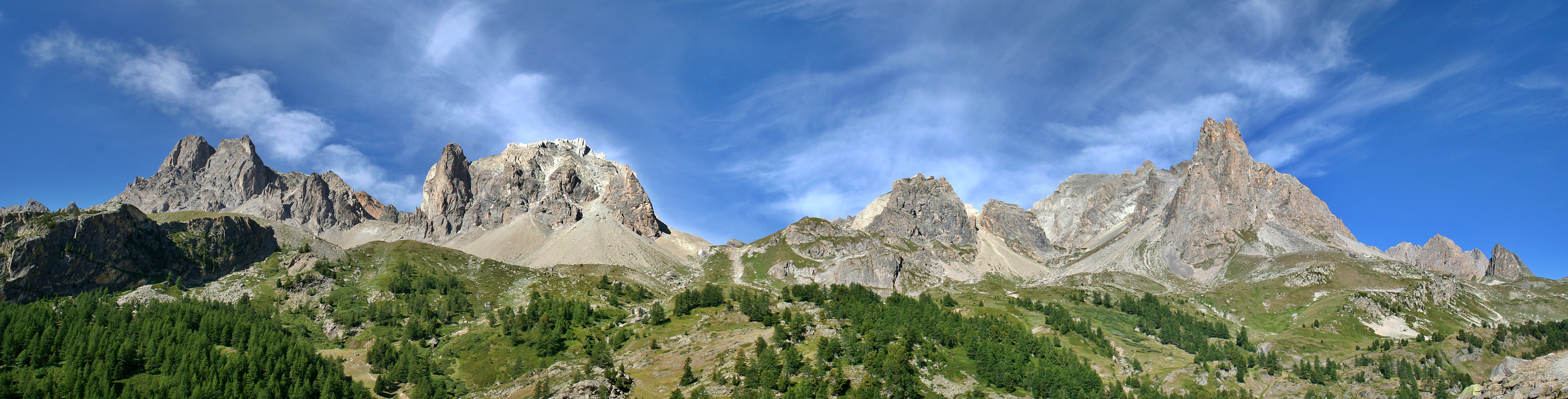
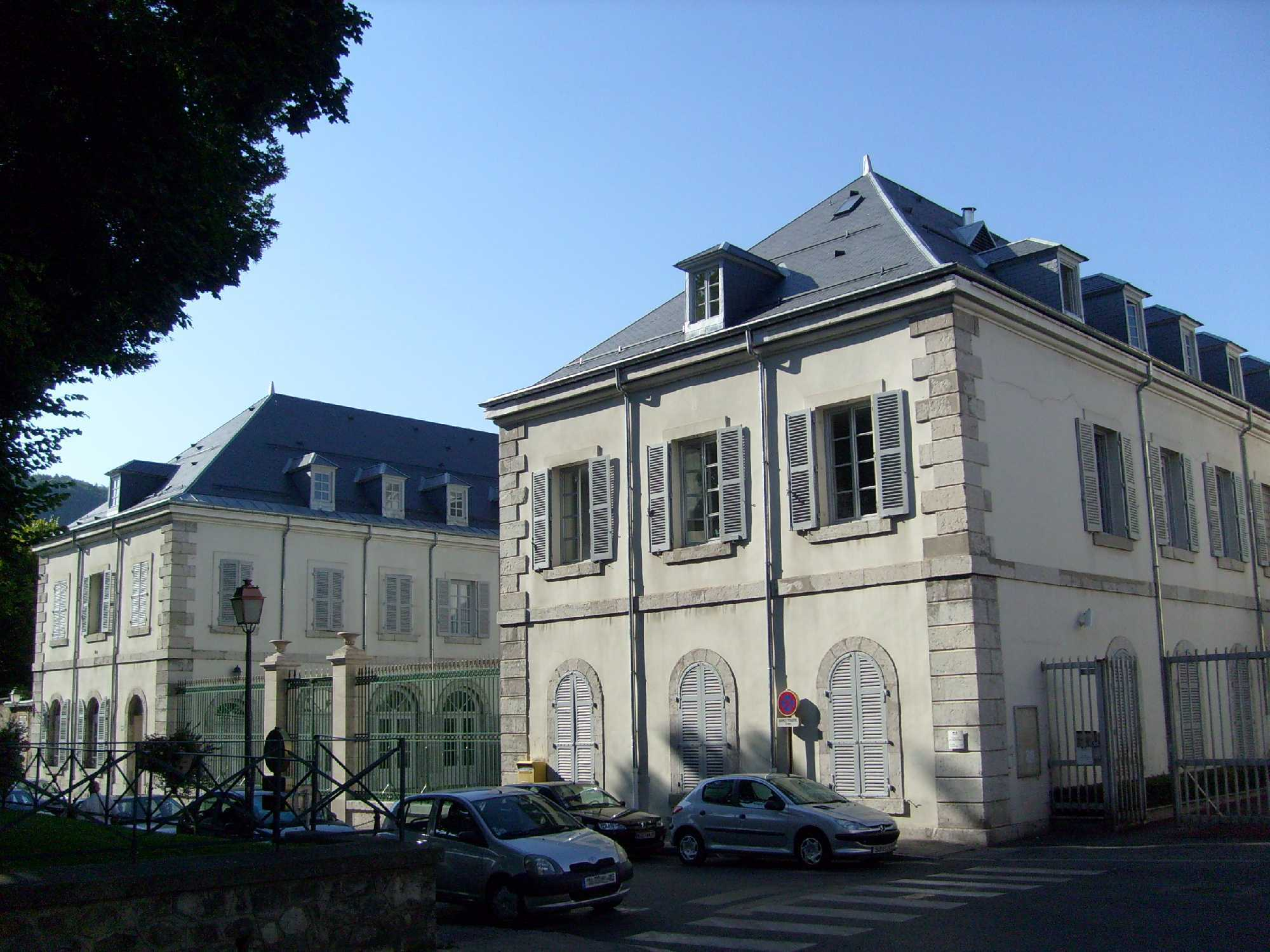
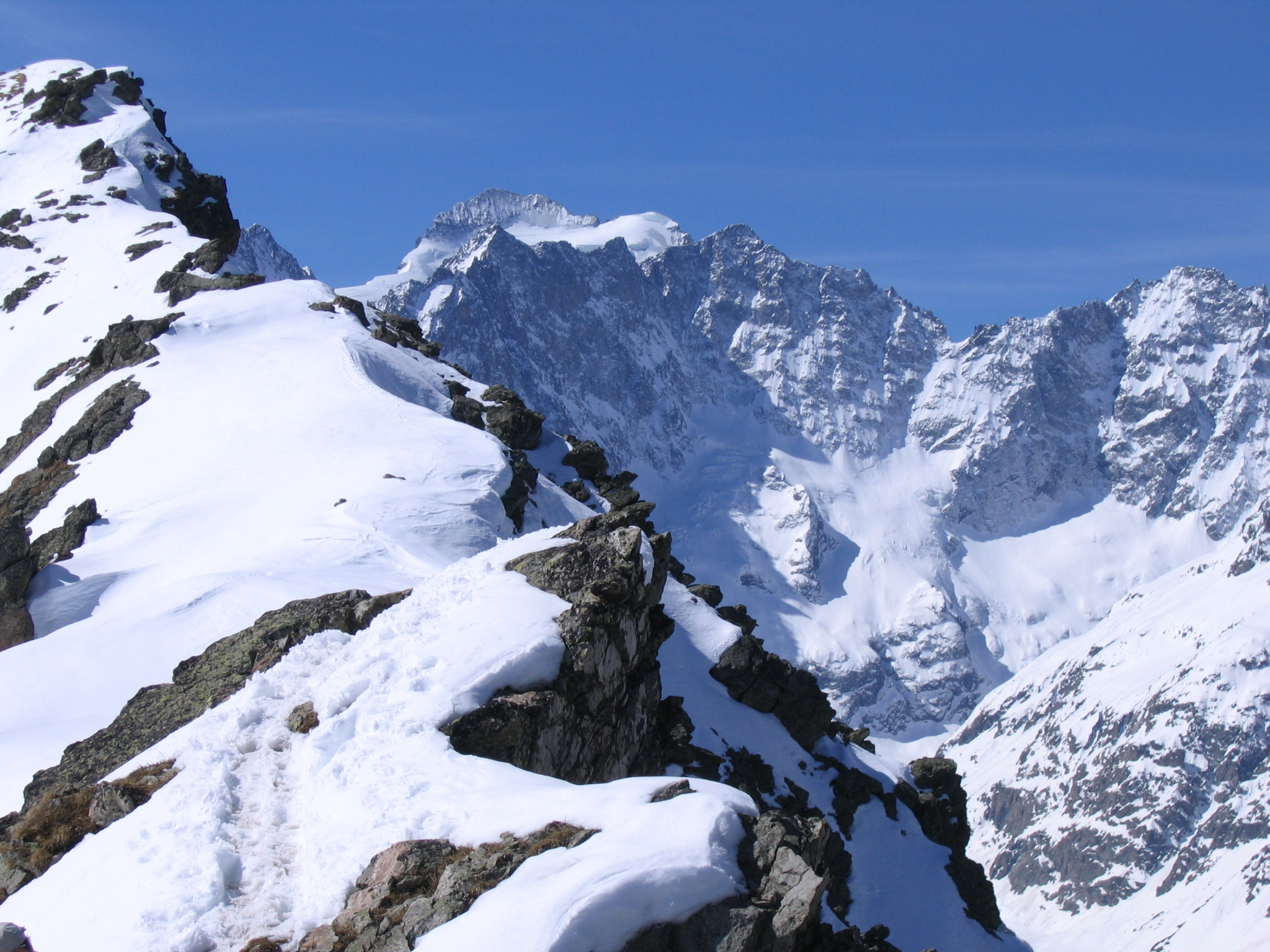
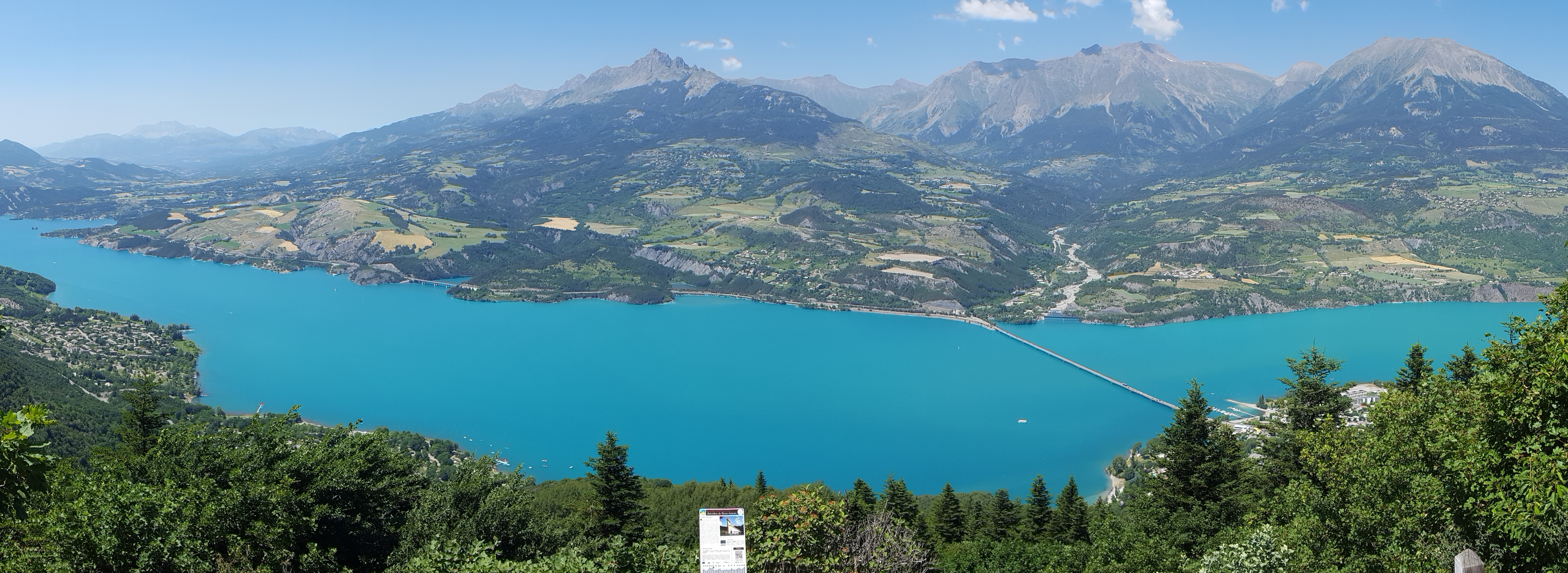
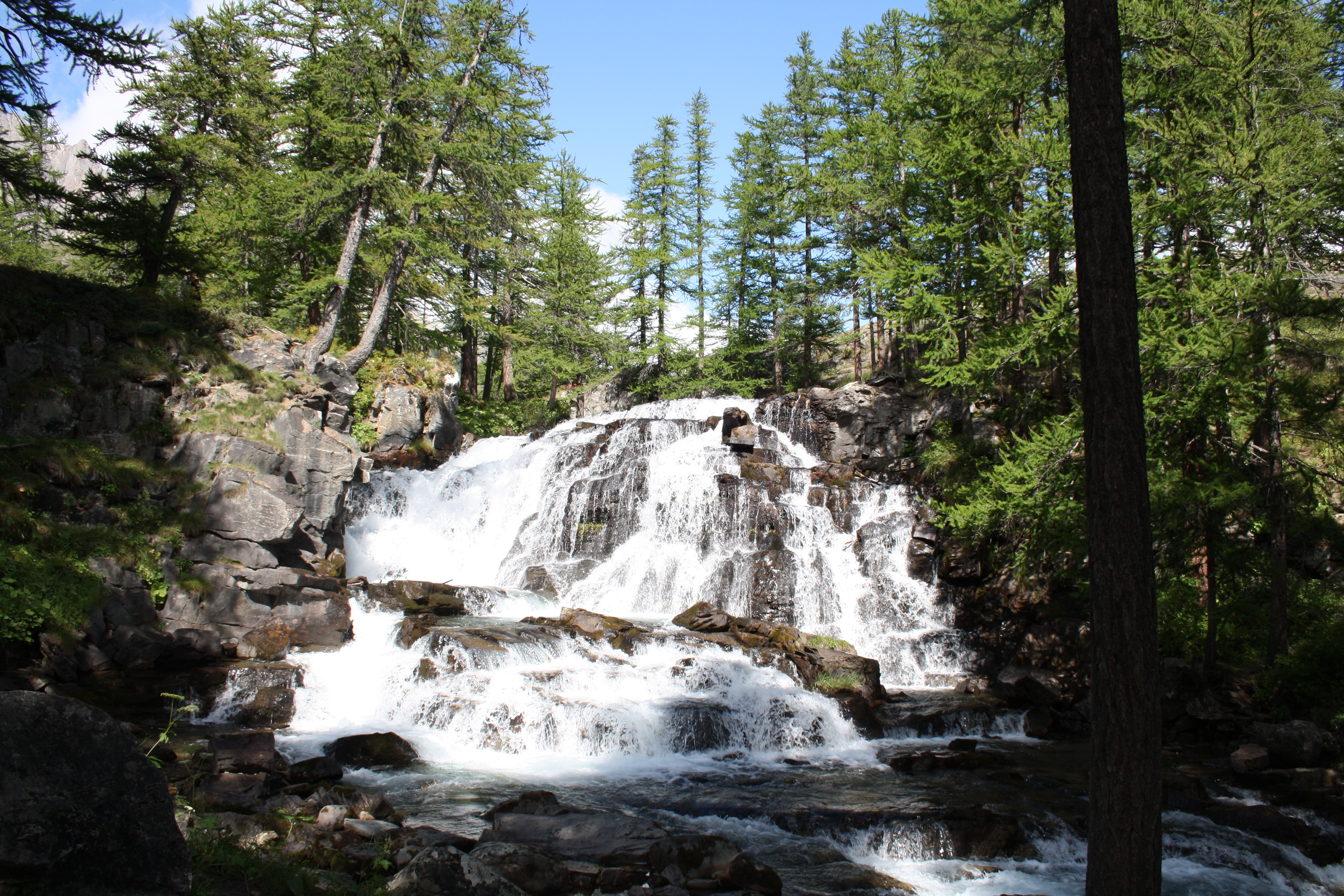
- Top down, left to right: Massif des Cerces, prefecture building in Gap, Barre des Écrins, Lac de Serre-Ponçon and waterfall in the Vallée de la Clarée

- Flag Coat of arms

- Location of Hautes-Alpes in France
- Coordinates: 44°40′N 6°20′E
- Country: France
- Region: Provence-Alpes-Côte d'Azur
- Prefecture: Gap
- Subprefectures: Briançon

Government
  - President of the Departmental Council: Jean-Marie Bernard (LR)

Area^{1}
  - Total: 5,549 km^{2} (2,142 sq mi)
- Elevation: 1,665 m (5,463 ft)
- Highest elevation: 4,101 m (13,455 ft)
- Lowest elevation: 470 m (1,540 ft)

Population (2023)
  - Total: 143,467
  - Rank: 100th
  - Density: 25.85/km^{2} (66.96/sq mi)
- Time zone: UTC+1 (CET)
  - Summer (DST): UTC+2 (CEST)
- Department number: 05
- Arrondissements: 2
- Cantons: 15
- Communes: 162
- ^1 French Land Register data, which exclude estuaries and lakes, ponds and glaciers larger than 1 km^{2}

Hautes-Alpes (French pronunciation: [ot.z‿alp]; Occitan: Auts Aups; English: Upper Alps) is a department in the Provence-Alpes-Côte d'Azur region of Southeastern France. It is located in the heart of the French Alps, after which it is named. Hautes-Alpes had a population of 143,467 as of 2023, which makes it the third least populated French department. Its prefecture is Gap; its sole subprefecture is Briançon. Its INSEE and postal code is 05.

== History ==
Hautes-Alpes is one of the original 83 departments created during the French Revolution on 4 March 1790. It consists of the southeast of the former province of Dauphiné and the north of Provence. At the time when the department was created, the two mountain communes of La Grave and Villar-d'Arêne successfully campaigned to be included in Hautes-Alpes and not in the neighbouring department of Isère to which they had originally been assigned. This was because they hoped to benefit from the relative autonomy and certain fiscal privileges enjoyed by the region since the 14th century under the terms of the Statute of the Briançon Escartons.

Napoleon passed through Gap when he returned to reclaim France after his exile on Elba using what is now known as Route Napoléon. After Napoleon's defeat at the Battle of Waterloo, the department was occupied by Austrian and Piedmontese troops from 1815 to 1818.

During World War II, Italy occupied Hautes-Alpes from November 1942 to September 1943.

== Geography ==
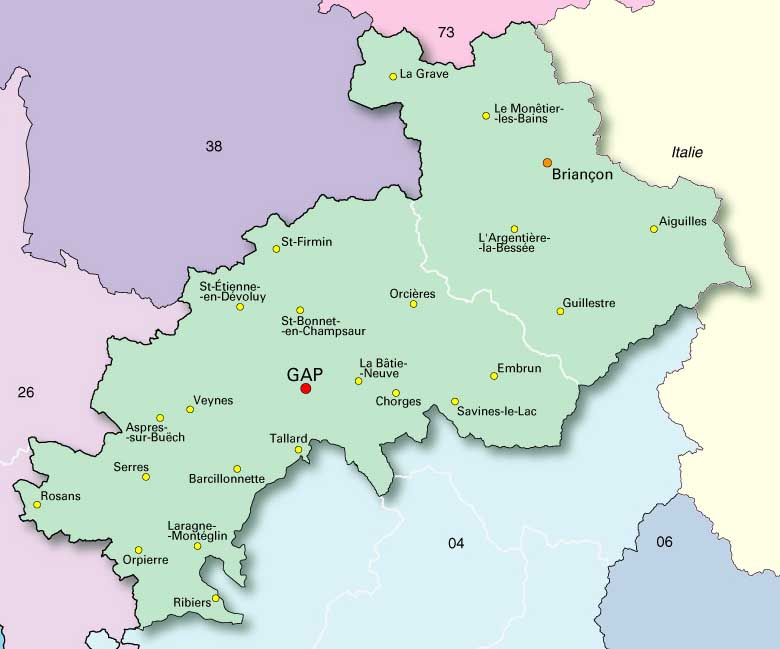
Map of Hautes-Alpes

The department is surrounded by the following French departments: Alpes-de-Haute-Provence, Drôme, Isère and Savoie. Italy borders it on the east with the Metropolitan City of Turin and the province of Cuneo, region of Piedmont.

Hautes-Alpes is located in the Alps mountain range. The average elevation is over 1000 m; the highest elevation is over 4000 m. The only three sizable cities are Gap, Briançon and Embrun, which was a subprefecture until 1926.

The third-highest settlement in all of Europe is the Hautes-Alpes village of Saint-Véran. Gap and Briançon are the highest prefecture and subprefecture in France, respectively.

The following rivers flow through the department: Durance, Guisane, Buëch, Drac and Clarée. The Durance has been dammed to create one of the largest artificial lakes in Western Europe: the Lac de Serre-Ponçon. The Queyras valley is located in the eastern part of the department and is noted by many as being an area of outstanding beauty.

=== Principal communes ===
The most populous commune is the prefecture Gap. As of 2023, there are 2 communes with more than 10,000 inhabitants, and 6 communes with more than 3,000 inhabitants:

Commune	Population (2023)
Gap	41,293
Briançon	11,411
Embrun	6,412
Laragne-Montéglin	3,549
Veynes	3,214
Chorges	3,146

== Demographics ==
The inhabitants of the department are called Haut-Alpins (masculine) and Haut-Alpines (feminine) in French.

The extremely mountainous terrain explains the sparse population, which was about 120,000 in 1791. It changed little during the 19th century, but fell to about 85,000 after World War I. Thanks in large part to tourism, the population has risen from 87,436 in 1962 to 143,467 in 2023, principally in the town of Gap.

Population development since 1791:

Historical population

Year	Pop.	±% p.a.
1791	120,485	—
1801	112,500	−0.68%
1826	125,329	+0.43%
1851	132,038	+0.21%
1872	118,898	−0.50%
1901	109,510	−0.28%
1911	105,083	−0.41%
1921	89,275	−1.62%
1931	87,566	−0.19%
1946	84,932	−0.20%
1954	85,067	+0.02%

Year	Pop.	±% p.a.
1962	87,436	+0.34%
1968	91,790	+0.81%
1975	97,358	+0.84%
1982	105,070	+1.09%
1990	113,300	+0.95%
1999	121,419	+0.77%
2007	132,482	+1.10%
2012	139,554	+1.05%
2017	141,284	+0.25%
2023	143,467	+0.26%

== Politics ==
=== Departmental Council of Hautes-Alpes ===
The President of the Departmental Council of Hautes-Alpes has been Jean-Marie Bernard of The Republicans since the 2015 departmental elections.

Party		Seats
•	The Republicans and Union of Democrats and Independents	22
	Socialist Party and Radical Party of the Left	8

=== Members of the National Assembly ===
Constituency	Member	Party
Hautes-Alpes's 1st constituency	Marie-José Allemand	Socialist Party
Hautes-Alpes's 2nd constituency	Valérie Rossi	Socialist Party

== Tourism ==
The tourist industry is largely dependent on skiing in winter. In summer the Alpine scenery and many outdoor activities attract visitors from across Europe (sailing, hiking, climbing and aerial sports such as gliding). The Tour de France passes through the department regularly. This draws many cycling fanatics to cycle the cols and watch the race.

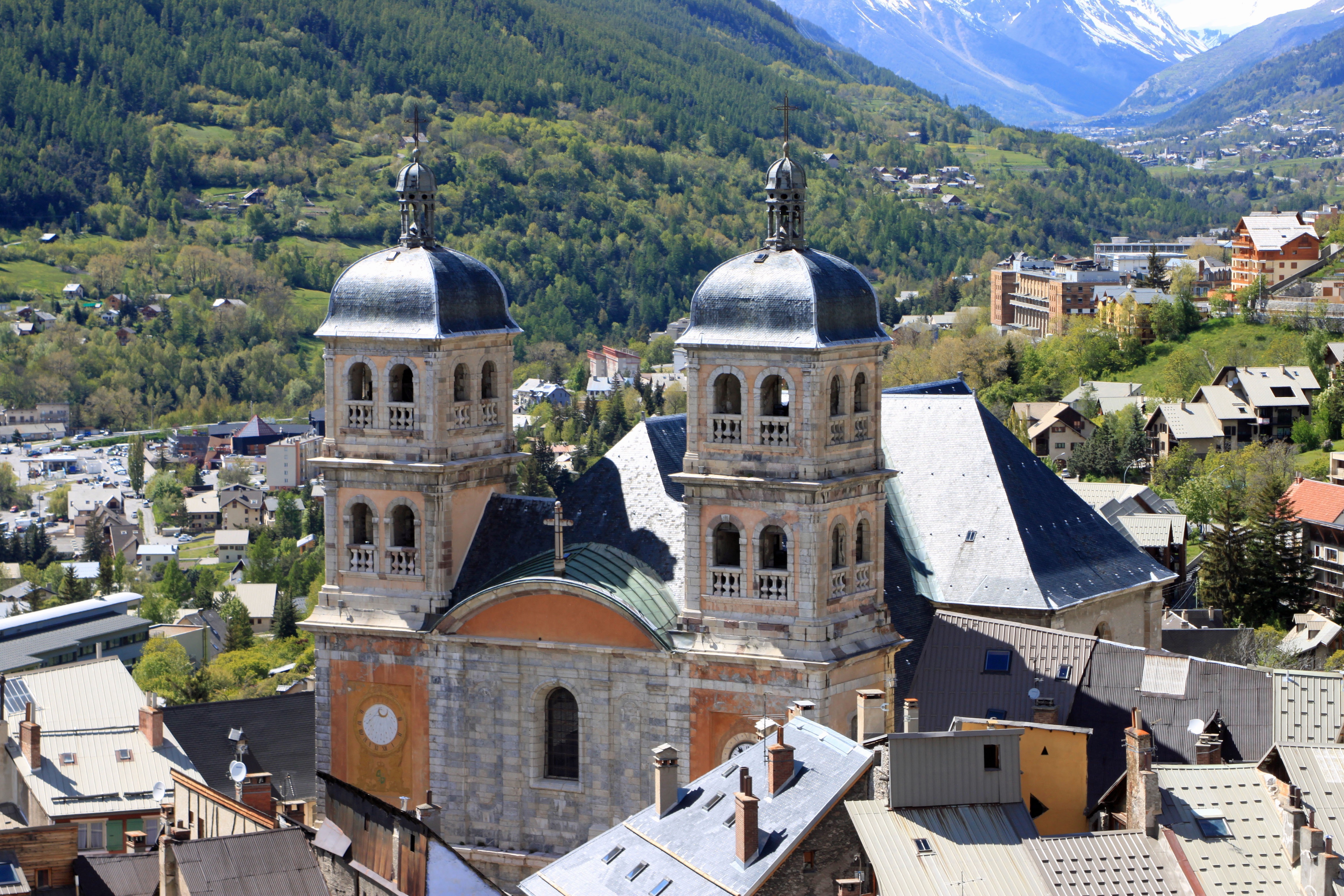
Briançon

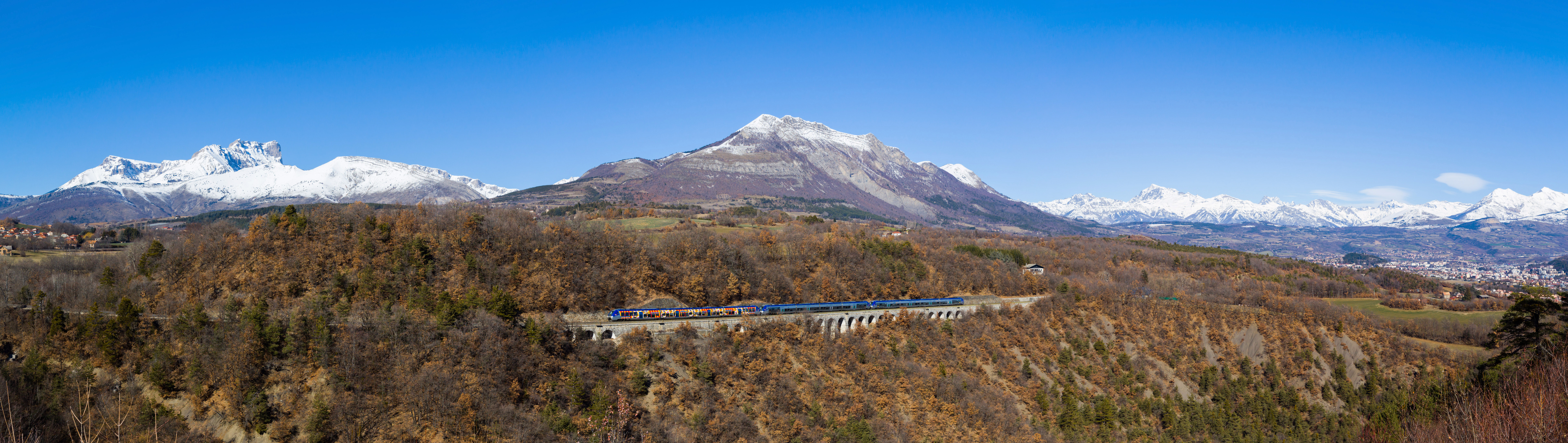
SNCF regional service near Gap

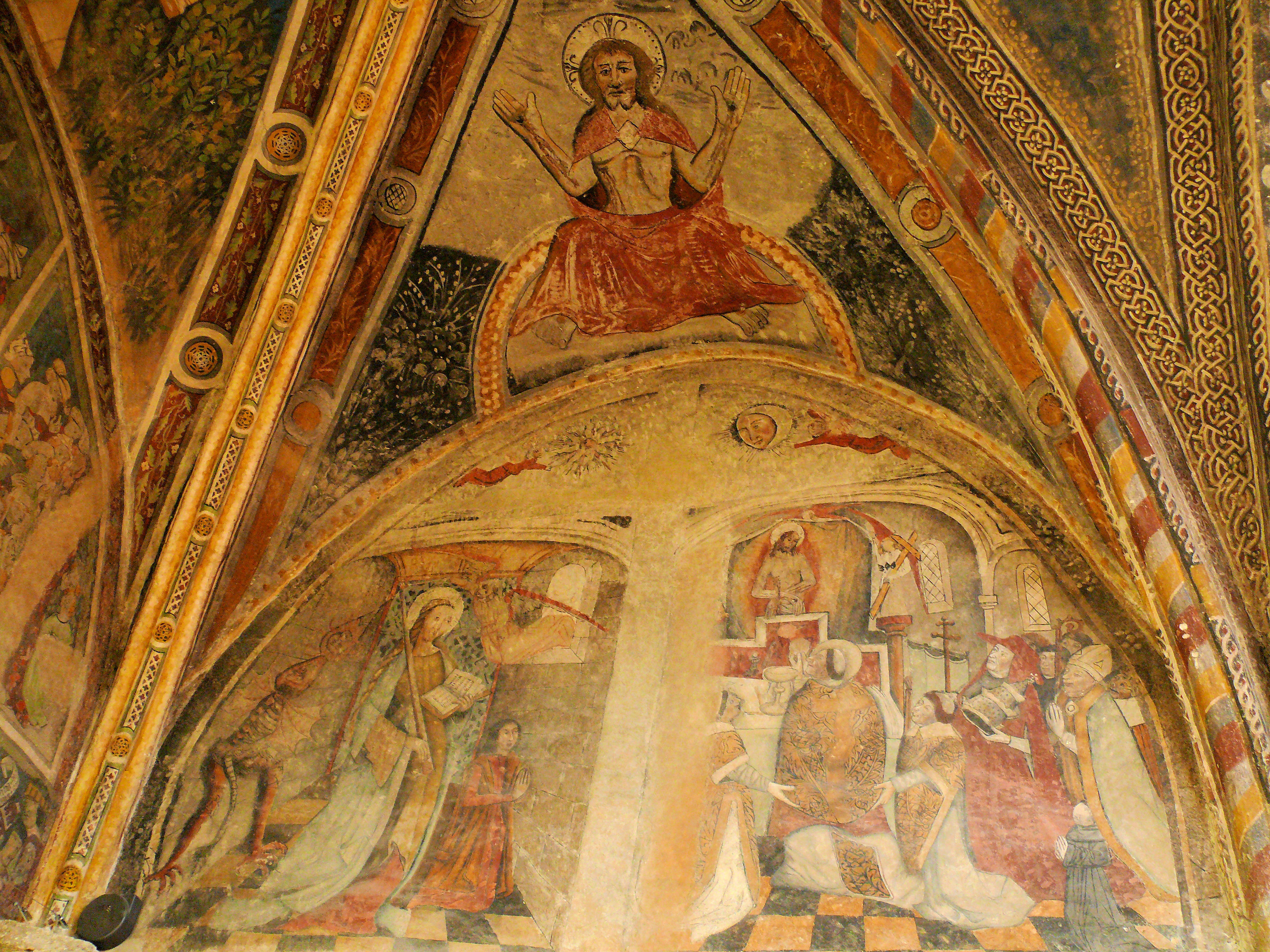
Embrun

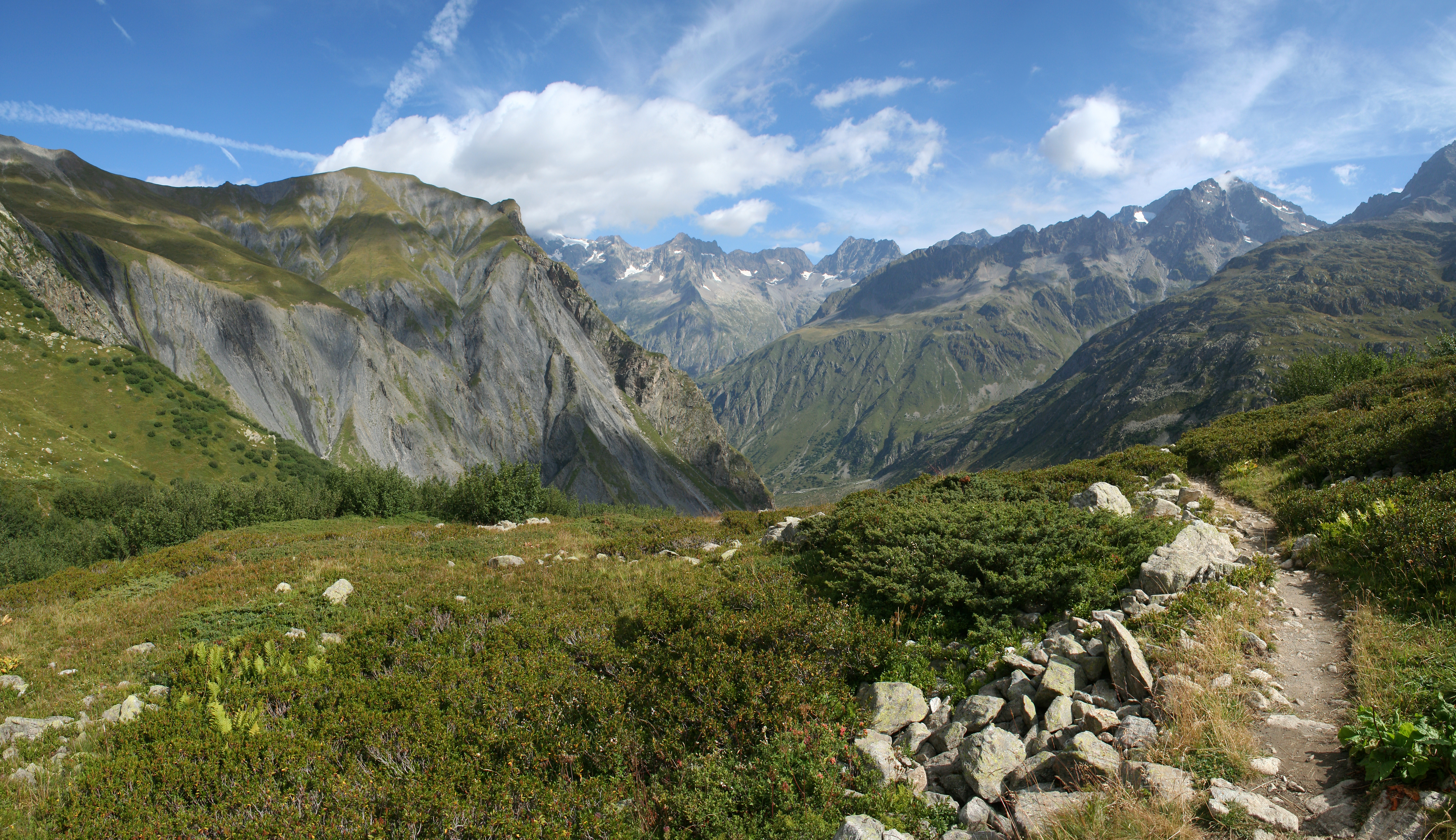
Massif des Écrins

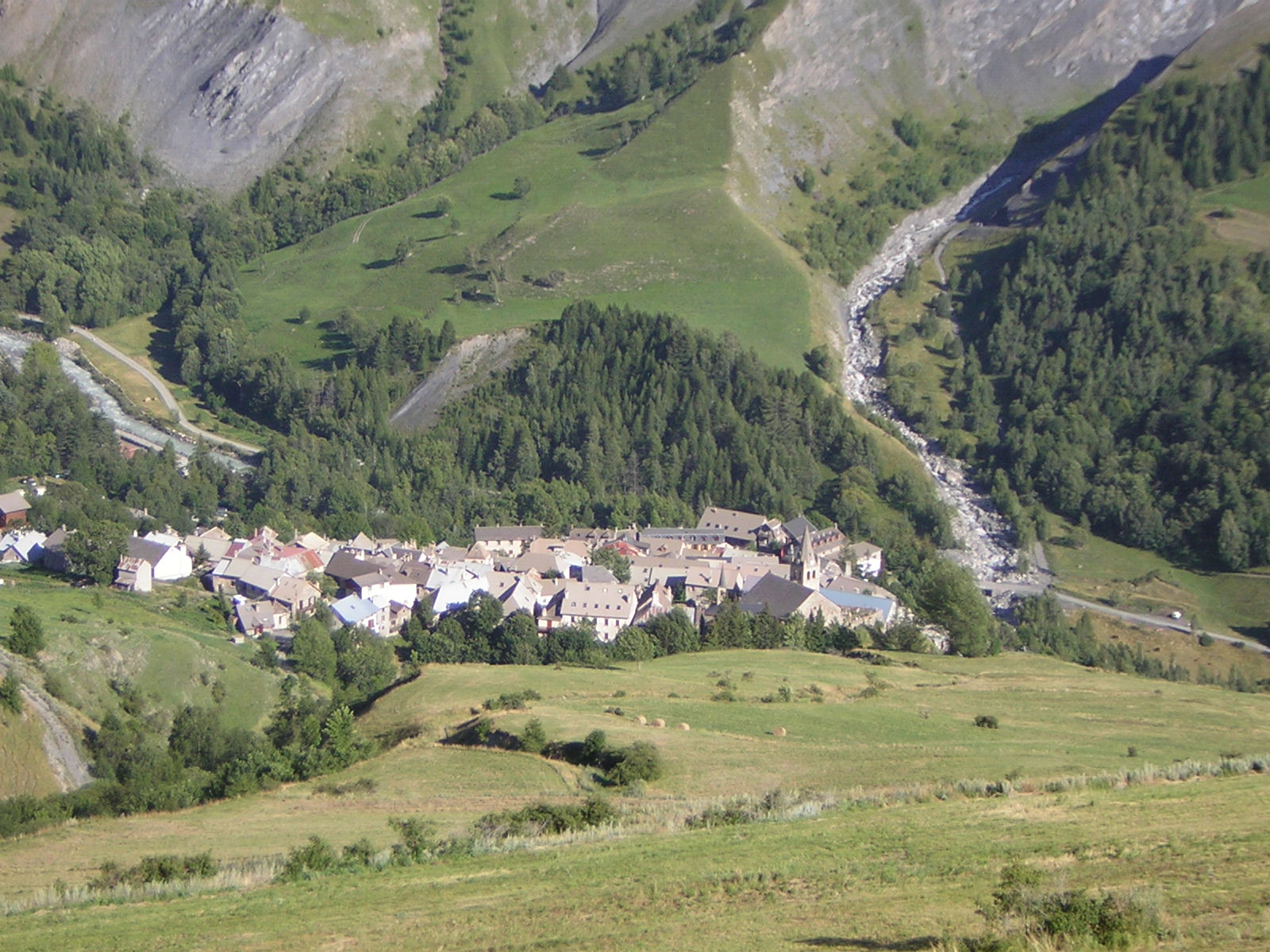
La Grave

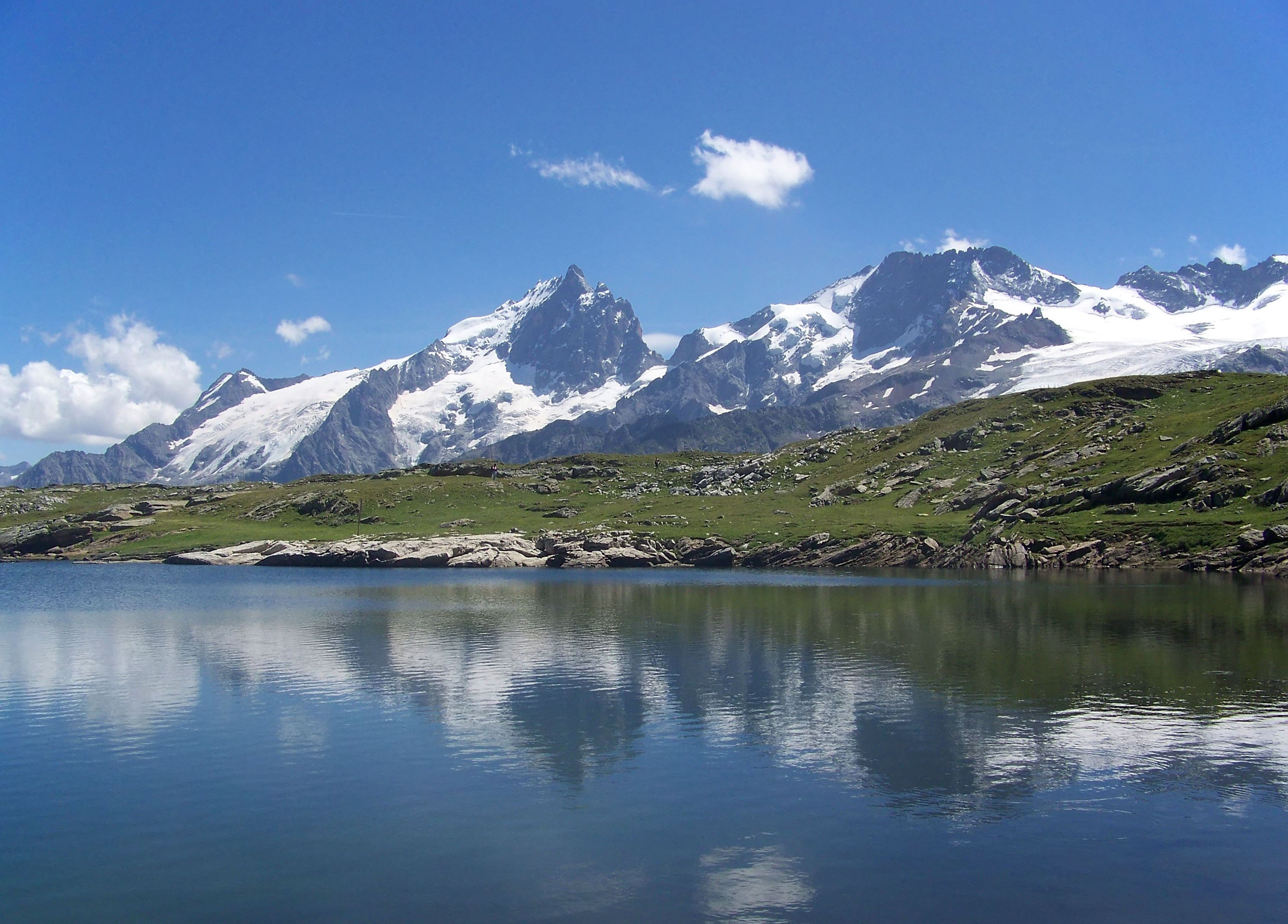
La Meije

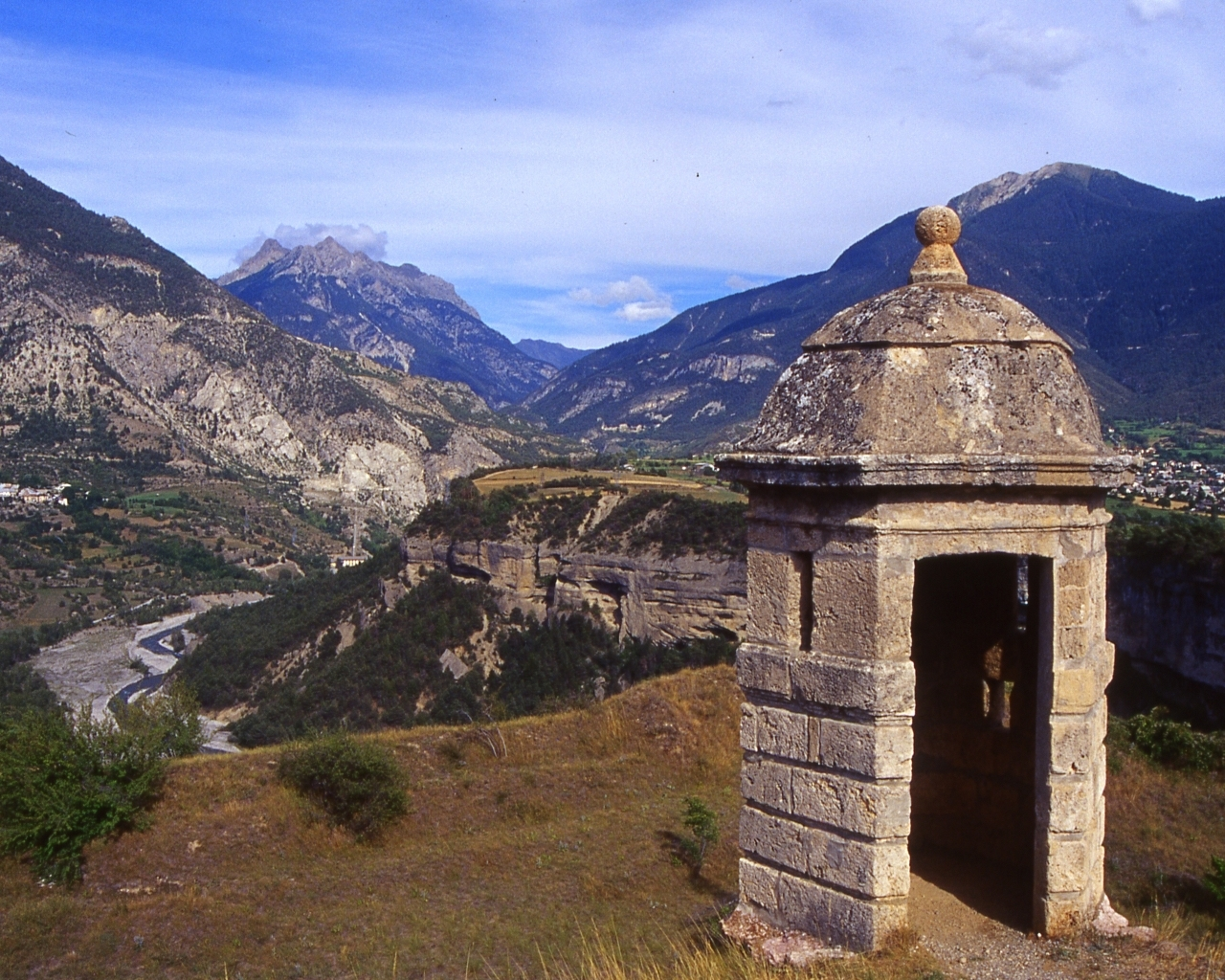
The Alps and the Guil valley seen from Fort Mont-Dauphin

== See also ==
- Cantons of the Hautes-Alpes department
- Communes of the Hautes-Alpes department
- Arrondissements of the Hautes-Alpes department
