= List of FIS Alpine Ski World Cup women's hosts =

This is a list of all women's hosts in FIS Alpine Ski World Cup from 1967 to present. The list includes all individual World Cup disciplines: downhill, super-G, giant slalom, slalom, Classic/Super/Alpine combined, parallel slalom and parallel giant slalom.

Since 2006 mixed team events are on schedule also. Fourteen parallel slalom events in total which counted for Nations Cup only, were held between 1976 and 1991.

== List of women's world cup hosts ==
=== Individual World Cup hosts ===
Total	DH	SG	GS	SL	KB	PSL	PGS	CE	K.O.	Hosts
1885	465	287	476	531	106	6	3	10	1	252

after SL in Gurgl (21 November 2026)

Rank	Host	Country	Events	DH	SG	GS	SL	KB	PSL	PGS	CE	K.O.
1	Cortina d'Ampezzo	Italy	104	45	37	15	4	3	–	–	–	–
2	Val d'Isere	France	93	36	21	19	6	11	–	–	–	–
3	Lake Louise	Canada	85	55	28	1	1	–	–	–	–	–
4	Åre	Sweden	74	10	9	27	25	3	–	–	–	–
5	Maribor (Note: Maribor hosted 68 (not 71) WC individual events in total. GS on 19 January 1975 was instead actually held at Sarajevo; GS and SL on 25 and 26 January 1976 were instead held at Kranjska Gora.)	Yugoslavia; Slovenia	68	–	1	29	37	1	–	–	–	–
6	St. Moritz	Switzerland	57	21	22	5	1	6	2	–	–	–
7	Aspen	United States	45	6	4	17	18	–	–	–	–	–
8	Garmisch-Partenkirchen	West Germany; Germany	41	16	18	1	6	–	–	–	–	–
9	Crans-Montana	Switzerland	39	17	7	2	5	8	–	–	–	–
10	Alten./Zauchensee (Note: Altenmarkt im Pongau hosted 37 (not 35) WC individual events in total. Slalom and GS events were also held on 9 and 10 March 2002 at the season final.)	Austria	37	16	10	1	5	5	–	–	–	–
11	Lenzerheide	Switzerland	35	9	6	7	9	4	–	–	–	–
	Sestriere (Note: Sestriere hosted 35 (not 34) WC individual events in total. Downhill was also held on 17 December 1971.)	Italy	35	4	4	9	15	1	–	1	–	1
13	Vail	United States	34	12	11	8	3	–	–	–	–	–
14	Semmering	Austria	33	–	–	15	18	–	–	–	–	–
15	Bad Gastein	Austria	31	13	–	1	11	6	–	–	–	–
	Grindelwald (Note: Grindelwald hosted 31 (not 30) WC individual events in total. Slalom event was also held on 17 January 1973.)	Switzerland	31	12	1	5	9	4	–	–	–	–
17	Lienz	Austria	30	–	–	14	16	–	–	–	–	–
18	Kranjska Gora (Note: Kranjska Gora hosted 29 (not 27) WC individual events in total. Giant slalom and slalom on 25 and 26 January 1976 were also held there.)	Yugoslavia; Slovenia	29	–	–	15	14	–	–	–	–	–
19	Sölden	Austria	28	–	–	28	–	–	–	–	–	–
20	Saint-Gervais-les-Bains (Note: Saint-Gervais-les-Bains hosted 26 (not 25) WC individual events in total. Classic combined was not held at 31 January 1975; Classic combined on 21 December 1981 and downhill on 20 December 1985 were also held there.)	France	26	3	–	8	12	3	–	–	–	–
	Levi	Finland	26	–	–	–	26	–	–	–	–	–
22	Schruns	Austria	24	10	–	–	10	4	–	–	–	–
23	Park City	United States	22	–	–	10	12	–	–	–	–	–
	Saalbach	Austria	22	8	3	5	4	2	–	–	–	–
	St. Anton	Austria	22	9	6	–	3	4	–	–	–	–
	Flachau (Note: Flachau under this name hosted 22 (not 24) WC individual events in total. As a close nearby Altenmarkt im Pongau hosted 2001/02 season final, giant slalom and Slalom on 9–10 March 2002, were officially held in Altenmarkt although on the same slopes in Flachau.)	Austria	22	–	2	1	18	1	–	–	–	–
27	Santa Caterina	Italy	21	6	4	6	4	1	–	–	–	–
28	Waterville Valley	United States	20	–	–	11	9	–	–	–	–	–
29	Piancavallo	Italy	19	3	–	3	10	3	–	–	–	–
	Haus im Ennstal	Austria	19	8	4	3	3	1	–	–	–	–
	Bormio	Italy	19	2	3	6	8	–	–	–	–	–
	Bad Kleinkirchheim	Austria	19	10	4	–	2	3	–	–	–	–
	Courchevel	France	19	1	1	9	7	–	1	–	–	–
34	Pfronten	West Germany	18	11	2	2	2	1	–	–	–	–
35	Oberstaufen	West Germany; Germany	17	–	–	10	7	–	–	–	–	–
	Veysonnaz	Switzerland	17	7	3	3	3	1	–	–	–	–
	Zagreb	Croatia	17	–	–	–	17	–	–	–	–	–
	Soldeu	Andorra	17	3	5	4	4	1	–	–	–	–
39	Zwiesel	West Germany; Germany	16	–	–	9	7	–	–	–	–	–
40	Ofterschwang	Germany	15	–	–	8	7	–	–	–	–	–
	Killington	United States	15	–	–	7	8	–	–	–	–	–
	Kvitfjell (Note: Kvitfjell hosted 13 (not 12) WC individual events in total. Downhill on 13 March 1993 was actually held there.)	Norway	15	7	8	–	–	–	–	–	–	–
43	Furano	Japan	14	2	2	5	5	–	–	–	–	–
44	Berchtesgaden	West Germany; Germany	13	–	–	5	8	–	–	–	–	–
	Megève (Note: Megève hosted 13 (not 14) WC individual events in total. GS on 21 January 1985 was instead actually held at Saint-Gervais-les-Bains.)	France	13	5	2	3	1	2	–	–	–	–
	Méribel	France	13	3	4	2	3	1	–	–	–	–
47	Špindlerův Mlýn	Czech Republic	12	–	–	5	7	–	–	–	–	–
	Hafjell (Note: Hafjell hosted 12 (not 13) WC individual events in total. Downhill on 13 March 1993 was instead actually held at Kvitfjell.)	Norway	12	–	1	4	4	3	–	–	–	–
49	Heavenly Valley	United States	11	1	–	5	5	–	–	–	–	–
	Tarvisio	Italy	11	4	4	–	–	3	–	–	–	–
	Morzine	France	10	3	2	2	2	1	–	–	–	–
	Mont St. Anne	Canada	10	1	1	5	3	–	–	–	–	–
	Tignes	France	10	2	1	6	–	–	1	–	–	–
	Kronplatz	Italy	10	–	–	10	–	–	–	–	–	–
55	Arosa	Switzerland	9	3	1	3	1	1	–	–	–	–
	Sierra Nevada	Spain	9	2	1	3	2	1	–	–	–	–
	Vysoké Tatry	Czechoslovakia	9	–	–	3	6	–	–	–	–	–
	Bansko	Bulgaria	9	4	4	–	–	1	–	–	–	–
59	Abetone	Italy	8	1	–	4	3	–	–	–	–	–
	Les Diablerets (Note: Les Diablerets hosted 8 (not 10) WC individual events in total. Two giant slaloms on 9 and 10 January 1975 were instead actually held at Les Mosses.)	Switzerland	8	3	–	–	4	1	–	–	–	–
	Meiringen	Switzerland	8	3	1	1	1	2	–	–	–	–
	San Sicario	Italy	8	3	3	1	–	1	–	–	–	–
	Mammoth Mountain	United States	8	–	4	–	3	–	1	–	–	–
	Jasná	Czechoslovakia; Slovakia	8	–	–	4	4	–	–	–	–	–
	Copper Mountain	United States	8	–	–	4	4	–	–	–	–	–
66	Steamboat Springs	United States	7	2	1	1	2	1	–	–	–	–
	Val Gardena	Italy	7	2	1	1	2	–	1	–	–	–
	Les Gets	France	7	–	–	4	3	–	–	–	–	–
	Innsbruck	Austria	7	3	4	–	–	–	–	–	–	–
	Sunshine	Canada	7	3	1	1	–	2	–	–	–	–
	Sun Valley	United States	7	–	1	3	3	–	–	–	–	–
72	Puy St. Vincent	France	6	3	2	–	–	1	–	–	–	–
	Chamonix	France	6	3	–	1	1	1	–	–	–	–
	Val Zoldana	Italy	6	–	–	4	2	–	–	–	–	–
	Courmayeur	Italy	6	–	–	1	5	–	–	–	–	–
	Panorama	Canada	6	3	1	1	1	–	–	–	–	–
	Schladming	Austria	6	1	2	1	2	–	–	–	–	–
	Beaver Creek	United States	6	2	3	1	–	–	–	–	–	–
	La Thuile	Italy	6	2	4	–	–	–	–	–	–	–
	Tremblant	Canada	6	1	–	5	–	–	–	–	–	–
	Val di Fassa	Italy	6	4	2	–	–	–	–	–	–	–
82	Narvik	Norway	5	2	–	2	1	–	–	–	–	–
	Verbier	Switzerland	5	1	2	–	1	1	–	–	–	–
	Mellau	Austria	5	1	–	–	3	1	–	–	–	–
	Oslo	Norway	5	–	–	1	2	–	–	–	2	–
	Zell am See	Austria	5	4	–	1	–	–	–	–	–	–
	Madonna di Campiglio	Italy	5	–	–	2	3	–	–	–	–	–
	Jackson Hole	United States	5	2	–	1	2	–	–	–	–	–
	Lech/Zürs	Austria	5	–	1	–	2	–	–	2	–	–
90	Hinterstoder	Austria	4	–	–	2	2	–	–	–	–	–
	Pra-Loup	France	4	1	–	2	1	–	–	–	–	–
	Naeba	Japan	4	–	–	2	2	–	–	–	–	–
	Limone Piemonte	Italy	4	–	–	2	2	–	–	–	–	–
	Squaw Valley	United States	4	–	–	2	2	–	–	–	–	–
	Stockholm	Sweden	4	–	–	–	–	–	–	–	4	–
	Davos	Switzerland	4	–	1	–	2	1	–	–	–	–
	Leukerbad	Switzerland	4	1	1	–	1	1	–	–	–	–
	Serre Chevalier	France	4	1	–	1	2	–	–	–	–	–
	Rossland	Canada	4	1	1	1	1	–	–	–	–	–
100	Klövsjö	Sweden	3	–	–	2	1	–	–	–	–	–
	Laax	Switzerland	3	1	–	–	1	1	–	–	–	–
	Whistler	Canada	3	2	–	–	–	1	–	–	–	–
	Reiteralm	Austria	3	–	1	–	1	1	–	–	–	–
	Grenoble	France	3	1	–	1	1	–	–	–	–	–
	Sarajevo	Yugoslavia	3	1	–	2	–	–	–	–	–	–
	Lake Placid	United States	3	1	–	2	–	–	–	–	–	–
	Sugarloaf	United States	3	2	–	1	–	–	–	–	–	–
	Franconia	United States	3	1	–	1	1	–	–	–	–	–
	Gurgl	Austria	3	–	–	–	3	–	–	–	–	–
110	Aprica	Italy	2	1	–	–	1	–	–	–	–	–
	Munich	Germany	2	–	–	–	–	–	–	–	2	–
	Wangs-Pizol	Switzerland	2	–	–	1	1	–	–	–	–	–
	Alpe d'Huez	France	2	–	–	1	1	–	–	–	–	–
	Happo One	Japan	2	2	–	–	–	–	–	–	–	–
	Vancouver	Canada	2	–	–	1	1	–	–	–	–	–
	Kühtai	Austria	2	–	–	1	1	–	–	–	–	–
	Jeongseon	South Korea	2	1	1	–	–	–	–	–	–	–
	Sterzing	Italy	2	–	–	1	1	–	–	–	–	–
	Les Mosses	Switzerland	2	–	–	2	–	–	–	–	–	–
	La Molina	Spain	2	–	–	1	1	–	–	–	–	–
	Voss	Norway	2	1	–	–	–	1	–	–	–	–
	Crystal Mountain	United States	2	2	–	–	–	–	–	–	–	–
	Banff	Canada	2	–	–	1	1	–	–	–	–	–
	Alta Badia	Italy	2	–	–	2	–	–	–	–	–	–
	Las Lenas	Argentina	2	1	1	–	–	–	–	–	–	–
	Stranda	Norway	2	–	–	1	1	–	–	–	–	–
	Moscow	Russia	2	–	–	–	–	–	–	–	2	–
	Shiga Kogen	Japan	2	–	–	1	1	–	–	–	–	–
	Stratton Mountain	United States	2	–	–	1	1	–	–	–	–	–
	Zinal	Switzerland	2	2	–	–	–	–	–	–	–	–
	Schwarzenberg	Austria	2	–	–	2	–	–	–	–	–	–
	Sochi/Rosa Khutor	Russia	2	1	1	–	–	–	–	–	–	–
133	Sundsvall	Sweden	1	–	–	–	1	–	–	–	–	–
	Bischofswiesen	West Germany	1	–	–	1	–	–	–	–	–	–
	Nakiska	Canada	1	1	–	–	–	–	–	–	–	–
	Bromont	Canada	1	–	–	1	–	–	–	–	–	–
	Anchorage	United States	1	–	–	1	–	–	–	–	–	–
	Flühli	Switzerland	1	–	–	–	1	–	–	–	–	–
	Les Menuires	France	1	–	–	1	–	–	–	–	–	–
	Garibaldi	Canada	1	–	–	1	–	–	–	–	–	–
	Haute-Nendaz	Switzerland	1	–	–	1	–	–	–	–	–	–
	Vemdalen	Sweden	1	–	–	–	1	–	–	–	–	–
	Saas-Fee	Switzerland	1	–	–	–	1	–	–	–	–	–
	Cervinia	Italy	1	–	–	–	1	–	–	–	–	–
	Mürren	Switzerland	1	–	–	–	1	–	–	–	–	–
	Les Contamines	France	1	–	–	1	–	–	–	–	–	–
	Pila	Italy	1	–	–	1	–	–	–	–	–	–
	Montgenevre	France	1	–	–	–	1	–	–	–	–	–
	Monte Bondone	Italy	1	–	–	–	1	–	–	–	–	–
	Savognin	Switzerland	1	–	–	–	1	–	–	–	–	–
	Lenggries	West Germany	1	–	–	–	1	–	–	–	–	–
	Bardonecchia	Italy	1	1	–	–	–	–	–	–	–	–

after SL in Gurgl (21 November 2026)

=== Parallel slalom hosts for Nations Cup ranking only ===
- 14 events — Saalbach (1), Mont St. Anne (1), Sierra Nevada (1), Arosa (1), Madonna di Campiglio (1), Laax (1), Montgenèvre (1), Furano (1), Oslo (1), Bromont (1), Munich (1), Bormio (1), Saalbach (1), Waterville (1)

=== Mixed team hosts ===
- 17 events — Lenzerheide (5), Åre (3), Méribel (2), Soldeu (2), Aspen (1), Garmisch-Partenkirchen (1), Innsbruck (1), St. Moritz (1), Schladming (1)
