= List of FIS Alpine Ski World Cup men's hosts =

This is a list of all men's hosts in FIS Alpine Ski World Cup from 1967 to present. The list includes all individual World Cup disciplines: downhill, super-G, giant slalom, slalom, classic/super/alpine combined, parallel slalom, and parallel giant slalom.

Since 2006 mixed team events are on schedule also. sixteen parallel slalom events in total which counted for Nations Cup only, were held between 1976 and 1991.

== List of men's world cup hosts ==
=== Individual World Cup hosts ===
Total	DH	SG	GS	SL	KB	PSL	PGS	CE	K.O.	Hosts
2002	549	260	476	562	134	2	8	10	1	138

after SL in Levi (15 November 2026)

Rank	Host	Country	Events	DH	SG	GS	SL	KB	PSL	PGS	CE	K.O.
1	Kitzbühel	Austria	192	71	23	1	59	38	–	–	–	–
2	Wengen	Switzerland	135	53	6	–	47	29	–	–	–	–
3	Val d'Isere (Note: Val d'Isere hosted 105 (not 106) WC individual events in total. Classic Combined on 3 February 1986 was instead actually held at Crans-Montana.)	France	105	36	16	35	12	6	–	–	–	–
4	Val Gardena	Italy	97	65	24	2	1	4	1	–	–	–
5	Garmisch-Partenkirchen	West Germany; Germany	93	40	23	7	16	7	–	–	–	–
6	Kranjska Gora	Yugoslavia; Slovenia	91	–	–	48	43	–	–	–	–	–
7	Adelboden	Switzerland	79	–	–	55	24	–	–	–	–	–
8	Beaver Creek (Note: Beaver Creek: 3 World Cup events in 1987/88 season in (of total 76) were held on old nearby "Centennial" downhill course and 73 World Cup events on new "Birds of Prey" course built by Bernard Russi (since 1997).)	United States	76	27	24	18	4	3	–	–	–	–
9	Kvitfjell	Norway	71	41	29	–	–	1	–	–	–	–
10	Madonna di Campiglio	Italy	58	1	2	9	43	3	–	–	–	–
11	Alta Badia	Italy	57	–	–	43	8	1	–	5	–	–
12	Schladming	Austria	56	8	5	9	32	2	–	–	–	–
	Bormio	Italy	52	32	9	4	5	2	–	–	–	–
14	Lake Louise	Canada	47	25	21	–	–	1	–	–	–	–
	Aspen	United States	43	18	7	10	8	–	–	–	–	–
16	Åre	Sweden	41	9	4	12	13	3	–	–	–	–
17	Chamonix (Note: Chamonix hosted 34 (not 36) WC individual events in total. Classic Combined on 1 February 1975 was instead actually held at Megève; and downhill on 11 February 1978 in Les Houches instead.)	France	34	11	–	–	13	9	–	1	–	–
18	Sestriere	Italy	30	3	2	5	18	1	–	–	–	1
19	Sölden	Austria	25	–	–	25	–	–	–	–	–	–
20	St. Anton (Note: St. Anton hosted 20 (not 21) WC individual events in total. Classic Combined on 18 February 1977 was instead actually held at Laax.)	Austria	20	7	3	–	7	3	–	–	–	–
	Park City	United States	20	–	–	10	10	–	–	–	–	–
	Saalbach	Austria	20	4	5	7	4	–	–	–	–	–
	Crans-Montana	Switzerland	20	5	5	4	4	2	–	–	–	–
24	Lenzerheide	Switzerland	18	4	3	5	6	–	–	–	–	–
25	Vail	United States	17	3	3	7	4	–	–	–	–	–
26	Furano	Japan	16	2	2	6	6	–	–	–	–	–
27	Heavenly Valley	United States	14	2	–	6	6	–	–	–	–	–
	Megève	France	14	6	1	1	5	1	–	–	–	–
	Whistler (Note: Whistler hosted 14 (not 15) WC individual events in total. Giant slalom on 2 March 1975 was instead actually held at Garibaldi.)	Canada	14	7	6	1	–	–	–	–	–	–
	Hinterstoder	Austria	14	–	4	8	1	1	–	–	–	–
	Levi	Finland	14	–	–	–	14	–	–	–	–	–
32	Morzine (Note: Morzine hosted 13 (not 14) WC individual events in total. Downhill on 12 January 1978 was instead actually held at Avoriaz.)	France	13	6	1	4	–	2	–	–	–	–
33	St. Moritz	Switzerland	13	7	1	3	2	–	–	–	–	–
	Veysonnaz	Switzerland	13	3	–	3	4	3	–	–	–	–
35	Zagreb	Croatia	12	–	–	–	12	–	–	–	–	–
36	Laax	Switzerland	11	6	2	1	1	1	–	–	–	–
	Cortina d'Ampezzo	Italy	11	5	2	2	2	–	–	–	–	–
	Flachau (Note: Flachau under this name hosted 11 (not 13) WC individual events in total. As a close nearby Altenmarkt im Pongau hosted 2001/02 season final, giant slalom and Slalom on 9–10 March 2002, were officially held in Altenmarkt although on the same slopes in Flachau.)	Austria	11	–	–	4	7	–	–	–	–	–
39	Berchtesgaden	West Germany	10	–	–	4	6	–	–	–	–	–
	Mont St. Anne	Canada	10	–	–	6	4	–	–	–	–	–
	Shiga Kōgen	Japan	10	–	–	3	7	–	–	–	–	–
	Hafjell	Norway	10	–	–	5	5	–	–	–	–	–
43	Waterville Valley	United States	9	–	–	5	4	–	–	–	–	–
	Bansko	Bulgaria	9	–	–	5	2	2	–	–	–	–
45	Bad Kleinkirchheim	Austria	8	2	1	2	2	1	–	–	–	–
	Yongpyong	South Korea	8	–	–	5	3	–	–	–	–	–
	Oslo	Norway	8	–	–	2	4	–	–	–	2	–
	Soldeu	Andorra	8	2	2	2	2	–	–	–	–	–
49	Voss	Norway	7	–	–	4	3	–	–	–	–	–
	Tignes	France	7	–	1	4	1	–	1	–	–	–
	Naeba	Japan	7	–	–	4	3	–	–	–	–	–
	Santa Caterina	Italy	7	2	1	2	1	1	–	–	–	–
	Lech/Zürs	Austria	7	–	1	–	3	1	–	2	–	–
	Méribel	France	7	1	1	3	2	–	–	–	–	–
	Sun Valley	United States	7	–	1	3	3	–	–	–	–	–
56	Sierra Nevada	Spain	6	2	1	2	1	–	–	–	–	–
	Squaw Valley (Palisades Tahoe)	United States	6	–	–	3	3	–	–	–	–	–
58	Jackson Hole	United States	5	2	–	1	2	–	–	–	–	–
	Parpan	Switzerland	5	–	–	–	4	1	–	–	–	–
	Panorama	Canada	5	3	2	–	–	–	–	–	–	–
61	Altenmarkt im Pongau	Austria	4	1	1	1	1	–	–	–	–	–
	Borovets	Bulgaria	4	–	–	2	2	–	–	–	–	–
	Jasná	Czechoslovakia	4	–	–	2	2	–	–	–	–	–
	Las Leñas	Argentina	4	4	–	–	–	–	–	–	–	–
	Markstein	France	4	–	–	1	2	1	–	–	–	–
	Stockholm	Sweden	4	–	–	–	–	–	–	–	4	–
	Breckenridge	United States	4	–	–	2	2	–	–	–	–	–
	Todtnau	West Germany; Germany	4	–	–	3	1	–	–	–	–	–
	Lake Placid	United States	4	1	–	3	–	–	–	–	–	–
	Oppdal	Norway	4	–	1	1	2	–	–	–	–	–
	Copper Mountain	United States	4	–	1	2	1	–	–	–	–	–
	Courchevel	France	4	2	1	1	–	–	–	–	–	–
73	Franconia	United States	3	1	–	1	1	–	–	–	–	–
	Grenoble	France	3	1	–	1	1	–	–	–	–	–
	Sugarloaf	United States	3	2	–	1	–	–	–	–	–	–
	Zwiesel	West Germany	3	–	–	2	1	–	–	–	–	–
	Pra-Loup	France	3	1	–	1	1	–	–	–	–	–
	Ebnat-Kappel	Switzerland	3	–	–	2	–	1	–	–	–	–
	Oberstaufen	West Germany	3	–	–	1	2	–	–	–	–	–
	Sarajevo	Yugoslavia	3	1	–	1	1	–	–	–	–	–
	Leukerbad	Switzerland	3	2	1	–	–	–	–	–	–	–
	Lienz	Austria	3	–	–	1	2	–	–	–	–	–
	Kirchberg	Austria	3	–	–	3	–	–	–	–	–	–
	Hemsedal	Norway	3	–	2	1	–	–	–	–	–	–
	Courmayeur	Italy	3	–	1	–	2	–	–	–	–	–
	Gurgl	Austria	3	–	–	–	3	–	–	–	–	–
87	Puy-Saint-Vincent	France	2	–	1	1	–	–	–	–	–	–
	Vancouver	Canada	2	–	–	1	1	–	–	–	–	–
	Stratton Mountain	United States	2	–	–	1	1	–	–	–	–	–
	Rossland	Canada	2	–	–	1	1	–	–	–	–	–
	Hindelang	West Germany	2	–	–	1	1	–	–	–	–	–
	Crystal Mountain	United States	2	2	–	–	–	–	–	–	–	–
	Banff	Canada	2	–	–	1	1	–	–	–	–	–
	Gällivare	Sweden	2	–	–	1	1	–	–	–	–	–
	Moscow	Russia	2	–	–	–	–	–	–	–	2	–
	Aprica	Italy	2	–	–	1	–	1	–	–	–	–
	Vipiteno	Italy	2	–	–	–	2	–	–	–	–	–
	Ofterschwang	Germany	2	–	–	1	1	–	–	–	–	–
	Vysoké Tatry	Czechoslovakia	2	–	–	1	1	–	–	–	–	–
	Jeongseon	South Korea	2	1	1	–	–	–	–	–	–	–
	Nakiska	Canada	2	1	1	–	–	–	–	–	–	–
	Bad Wiessee	West Germany	2	–	–	–	2	–	–	–	–	–
	Sochi	Russia	2	1	–	–	–	1	–	–	–	–
	Thredbo	Australia	2	–	–	1	1	–	–	–	–	–
	Valloire	France	2	–	2	–	–	–	–	–	–	–
	Geilo	Norway	2	–	–	–	2	–	–	–	–	–
	Munich	Germany	2	–	–	–	–	–	–	–	2	–
	Mount Hutt	New Zealand	2	–	–	1	1	–	–	–	–	–
	Innsbruck	Austria	2	1	1	–	–	–	–	–	–	–
	Reiteralm	Austria	2	–	–	–	1	1	–	–	–	–
111	Grindelwald	Switzerland	1	1	–	–	–	–	–	–	–	–
	Anchorage	United States	1	–	–	1	–	–	–	–	–	–
	Fulpmes	Austria	1	–	–	1	–	–	–	–	–	–
	San Sicario	Italy	1	–	–	1	–	–	–	–	–	–
	Pontresina	Switzerland	1	1	–	–	–	–	–	–	–	–
	Zell am See	Austria	1	1	–	–	–	–	–	–	–	–
	Avoriaz	France	1	1	–	–	–	–	–	–	–	–
	Zakopane	Poland	1	–	–	–	1	–	–	–	–	–
	Bromont	Canada	1	–	–	–	1	–	–	–	–	–
	Garibaldi	Canada	1	–	–	1	–	–	–	–	–	–
	La Mongie	France	1	–	–	–	1	–	–	–	–	–
	Happo One	Japan	1	–	1	–	–	–	–	–	–	–
	Stoneham	Canada	1	–	–	–	1	–	–	–	–	–
	Saint-Gervais-les-Bains	France	1	–	–	1	–	–	–	–	–	–
	Arosa	Switzerland	1	–	–	1	–	–	–	–	–	–
	Mürren	Switzerland	1	–	–	–	1	–	–	–	–	–
	Les Houches	France	1	1	–	–	–	–	–	–	–	–
	Steinach	Austria	1	–	–	1	–	–	–	–	–	–
	Saas-Fee	Switzerland	1	–	–	1	–	–	–	–	–	–
	Villars	Switzerland	1	1	–	–	–	–	–	–	–	–
	Tärnaby	Sweden	1	–	–	–	1	–	–	–	–	–
	Montgenèvre	France	1	–	–	–	1	–	–	–	–	–
	Val Thorens	France	1	–	–	1	–	–	–	–	–	–
	Sälen	Sweden	1	–	–	–	1	–	–	–	–	–
	Morioka	Japan	1	–	1	–	–	–	–	–	–	–
	Les Menuires	France	1	–	1	–	–	–	–	–	–	–
	Les Arcs	France	1	–	–	1	–	–	–	–	–	–
	Les Diablerets	Switzerland	1	–	–	1	–	–	–	–	–	–
	Lenggries	West Germany	1	–	–	–	1	–	–	–	–	–
	Lillehammer	Norway	1	–	–	–	1	–	–	–	–	–
	Livigno	Italy	1	–	1	–	–	–	–	–	–	–

after SL in Levi (15 November 2026)

=== Parallel slalom hosts for Nations Cup ranking only ===
- 16 events — Saalbach (2), Mont St. Anne (1), Sierra Nevada (1), Arosa (1), Madonna di Campiglio (1), Laax (1), Montgenèvre (1), Furano (1), Oslo (1), Vienna (1), Bromont (1), Berlin (1), Bormio (1), Saalbach (1), Waterville (1)

=== Mixed team hosts ===
- 17 events — Lenzerheide (5), Åre (3), Méribel (2), Soldeu (2), Aspen (1), Garmisch-Partenkirchen (1), Innsbruck (1), St. Moritz (1), Schladming (1)
