= Pragelato =

Pragelato Prajalats
- Comune
- Comune di Pragelato
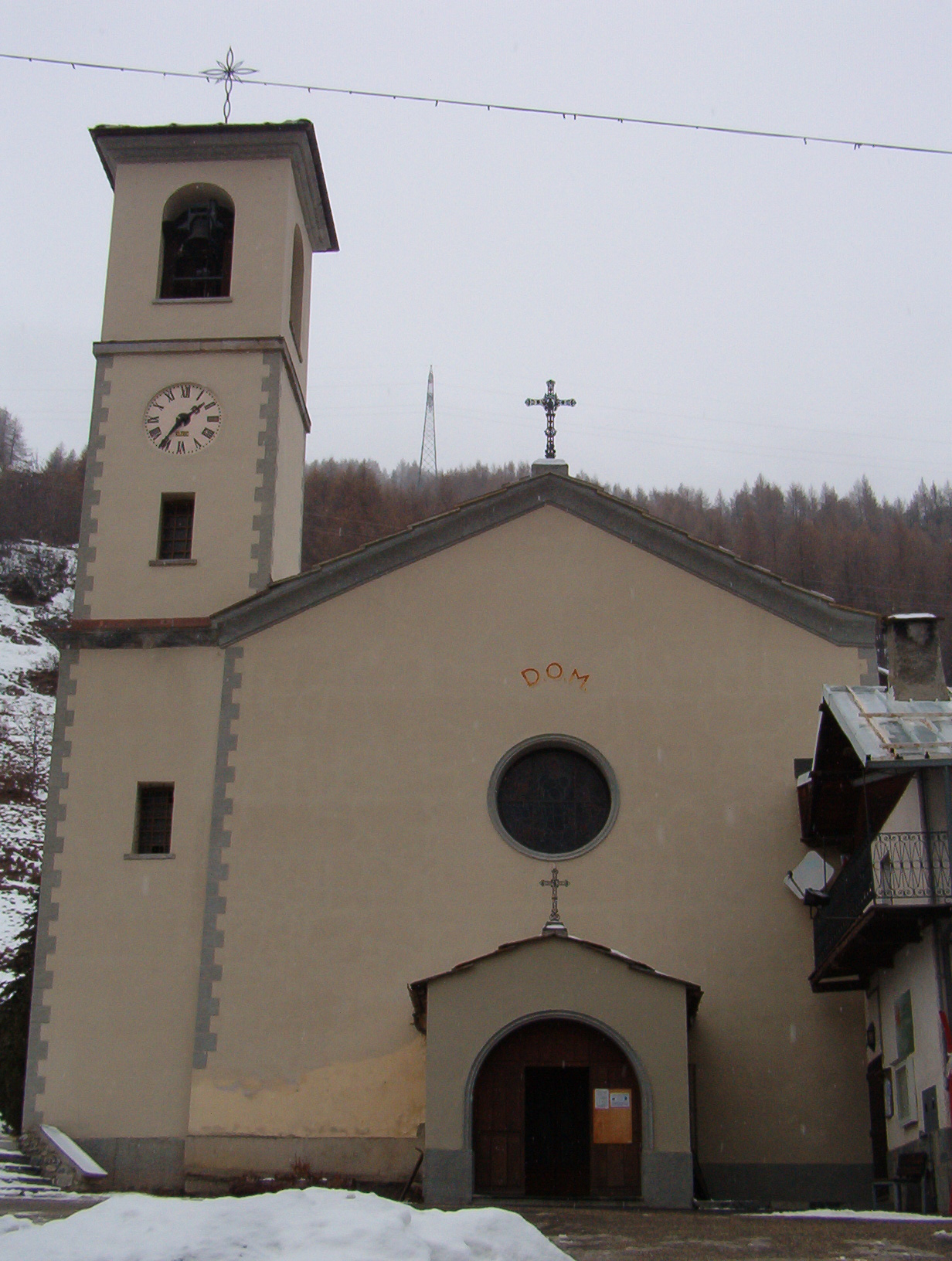
- Parish church

- Coat of arms

- Location within Italy Location within Piedmont
- Coordinates: 45°1′N 6°57′E
- Country: Italy
- Region: Piedmont
- Metropolitan city: Turin (TO)
- Frazioni: La Ruà, Allevè, Chezal, Duc, Grand Puy, Granges, Jousseaud, Laval, Pattemouche, Plan, Rif, Rivets, Seytes, Troncea, Souchéres Basses, Souchère Haute, Traverses, Villardamond, Val Tronche, Tronchée

Government
  - Mayor: Giorgio Merlo

Area
  - Total: 89.20 km^{2} (34.44 sq mi)
- Elevation: 1,518 m (4,980 ft)

Population (31 August 2021)
  - Total: 733
  - Density: 8.22/km^{2} (21.3/sq mi)
- Demonym: Pragelatesi
- Time zone: UTC+1 (CET)
  - Summer (DST): UTC+2 (CEST)
- Postal code: 10060
- Dialing code: 0122
- Website: Official website

Pragelato (also Pragelà; Vivaro-Alpine: Prajalats; French: Prajela; Occitan: Prajalats) is a comune (municipality) in the Metropolitan City of Turin in the Italian region Piedmont, located about 60 kilometres (37 mi) west of Turin, in the upper Val Chisone. The name Pragelato, meaning "icy meadow", has been derived from the harsh climate and the fact that the ground is covered with ice for long periods. On both sides of the Chisone, extensive forests of pine and larch provide protection from the avalanches which are a common occurrence in the winter season: for this reason in the nineteenth century the people of Pragelato were only permitted to fell trees close to the mountain summits, and even then only with the permission of the communal administration.

Pragelato borders the following municipalities: Exilles, Oulx, Salbertrand, Usseaux, Fenestrelle, Sauze d'Oulx, Massello, Sestriere, Sauze di Cesana, Salza di Pinerolo, Prali.

== History ==
Pragelato was part of the Escartons Republic, a semi-independent collection of mountain territories in the Occitan Alps which lasted from 1343 to 1713. After the Treaty of Utrecht of the latter, it became a possession of the House of Savoy.

In 1747 the nearby Assietta Pass was the stage of the eponymous battle. During the 19th and 20th century, much of the population emigrated to France.

On 19 April 1904, an avalanche struck the miners barracks of the Beth copper mine in the nearby Troncea Valley, killing 81 people. A memorial plaque in the small cemetery of the Laval hamlet remembers the victims of the avalanche.

Pragelato was the site of three sports hosted during the 2006 Winter Olympics. Its ski jump hosted the ski jumping and the ski jumping part of the Nordic combined events of the 2006 Winter Olympics. The flat part of the venue hosted the cross-country skiing and cross country skiing part of the Nordic combined events for those same games.

=== Ski area ===
Pragelato is well equipped for cross-country skiing. Its Olympic course – the Pragelato Plan – has a snow-making system over 10 kilometres (6 mi), and a tourist course winds along Val Troncea Natural Park.

The ski-jumping stadium presents the Olympic heritage, which highlights the tourist-sport development of this resort.

Pragelato has his own alpine skiing areas with about 50 kilometres (31 mi) of slopes and is linked to the Via Lattea ski area, with about 400 kilometres (250 mi) of slopes in Sestriere, Sauze d'Oulx, Montgenevre (France), Claviere, Pragelato, San Sicario, Cesana.

=== Natural parks ===
- Parco naturale Val Troncea
- Orsiera Nature Reserve, which stretches across the Northern Cottian Alps and encompasses the Val Chisone, Val Susa and Val Sangone. On average, the borders of this protected area reach 1,400 metres (4,600 ft) in elevation, and the reserve includes a wealth of fauna and historical landmarks, including rock engravings and military buildings.
- Alpine lakes include the Lakes of Cristalliera, where herds of mouflon come to graze, Lake Chardonnet, the Lakes of Beth, which afford views of the old abandoned copper mines, and the Lakes of Albergian, where edelweiss and Alpine aster blossom in summer.
