= Sauze d'Oulx =

- Comune
- Comune di Sauze d'Oulx
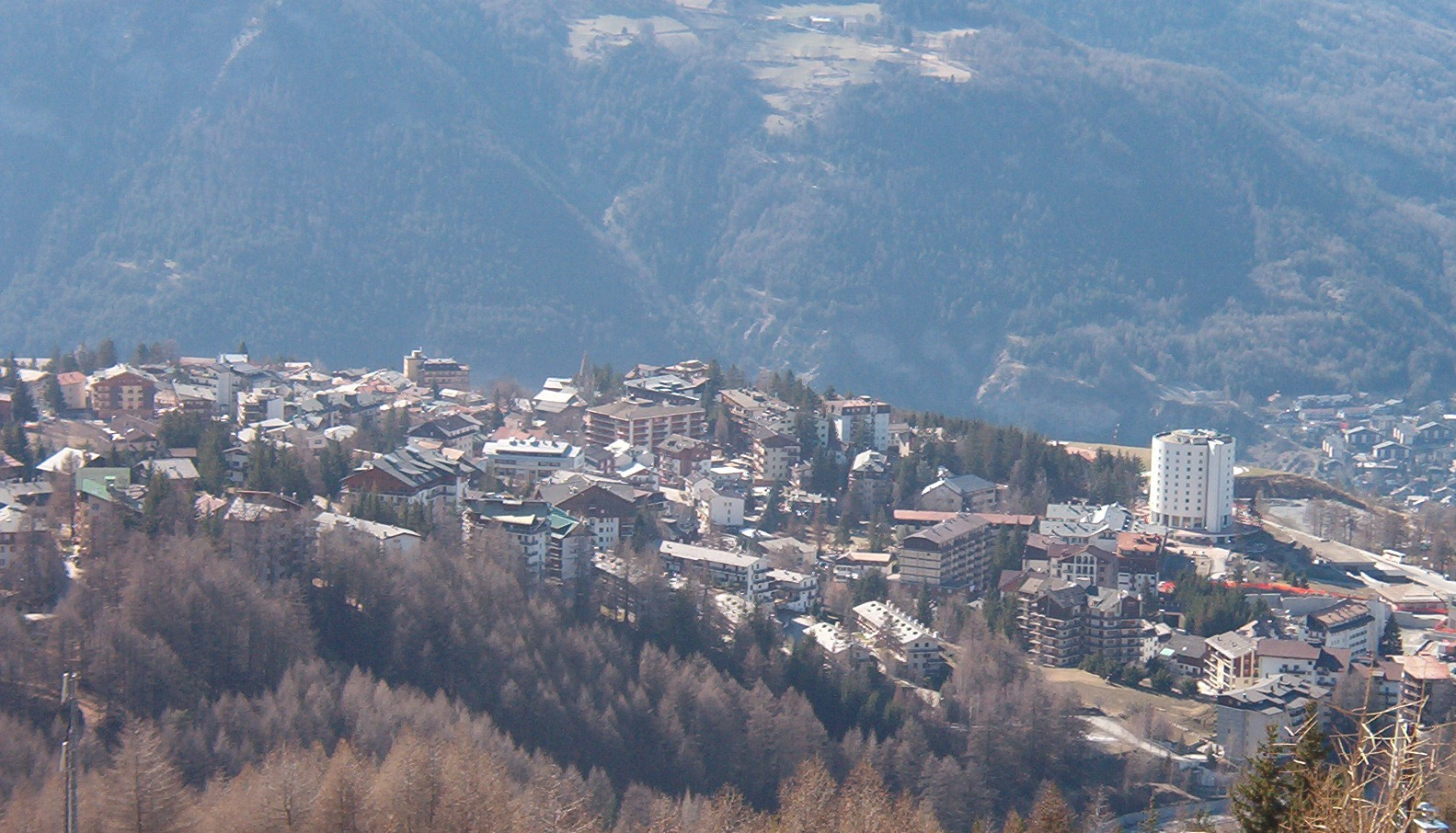

- Coat of arms

- Location within Piedmont Location within Italy
- Coordinates: 45°1′N 6°51′E
- Country: Italy
- Region: Piedmont
- Metropolitan city: Turin (TO)
- Frazioni: Jouvenceaux, Les Clotes, Monfol, Richardet, Sportinia, Tachier

Government
  - Mayor: Mauro Meneguzzi

Area
  - Total: 17.31 km^{2} (6.68 sq mi)
- Elevation: 1,510 m (4,950 ft)

Population (30 September 2015)
  - Total: 1,108
  - Density: 64.01/km^{2} (165.8/sq mi)
- Demonym: Salicese(i)
- Time zone: UTC+1 (CET)
  - Summer (DST): UTC+2 (CEST)
- Postal code: 10050
- Dialing code: 0122
- Patron saint: St. John the Baptist
- Saint day: 24 June
- Website: Official website

Sauze d'Oulx (Italian pronunciation: [ˈsaudze ˈdulks]) is a resort in the Via Lattea ski area. It is a town and comune in the Metropolitan City of Turin, Piedmont (northern Italy) located 80 km (50 miles) from Turin in the Val di Susa, at the foot of Monte Genevris (2,536 m or 8,320 feet).

It was the site of the freestyle skiing events of the 2006 Olympic Winter Games. Together with the villages of Pragelato, Sestriere, Claviere, Cesana Torinese, San Sicario and Montgenèvre, in France, the Via Lattea (Milky Way) skiing area has 400km of pistes.

Since the beginning of the 19th century, Sauze d'Oulx has been a destination for the Turin aristocracy, with its famous winter resort Sportinia and is still a skiing favourite because of its natural and accessible location.

== Skiing in Sauze d'Oulx ==
The winter season runs from mid-December to the end of March. Snow conditions vary across the Via Lattea with Sauze d'Oulx being the favoured resort during poor weather, low visibility and for skiing after fresh snowfall. Although earlier in the season Sauze d'Oulx can suffer from less snow coverage on the runs back into the resort, the area benefits from links to the rest of the Via Lattea and there are over 400km of slopes to explore. Some ski passes include a days usage at Montgenèvre which can be reached via ski or regular coach connections organised by local tour companies.

== History ==
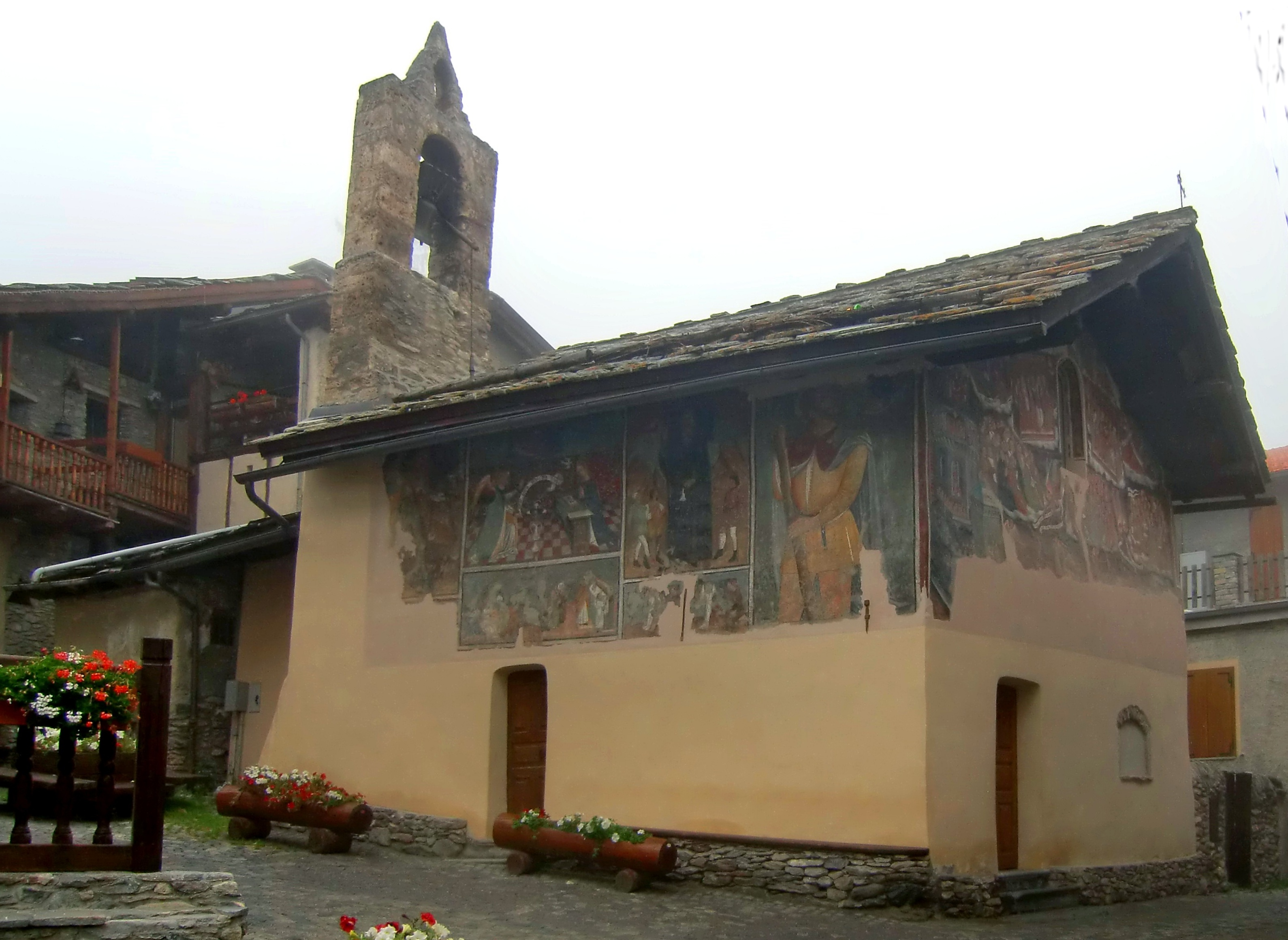
Chapel of Sant'Antonio abate in Jouvenceaux

Archaeological findings have proved the presence of Celtic settlements in the pre-Roman age. After the fall of the Western Roman Empire, in the Middle Ages it was owned by the Novalesa Abbey and then by the provosts of Oulx. From 1000, it was part of the Dauphiné and then of the Escartons Republic (until 1343); with the Treaty of Utrecht (1713) France gave it to the House of Savoy; in 1747 its territory was the seat of the Battle of Assietta between France and Savoy's Kingdom of Sardinia.

During the Fascist Era, in 1928, its name was changed to Salice d'Ulzio, "foreigner" words being forbidden, according to the etymological interpretation of "Sauze" as "salice" (Italian for willow). After World War II, the town became an autonomous comune and the previous name was restored.
