= Venues of the 2006 Winter Olympics =

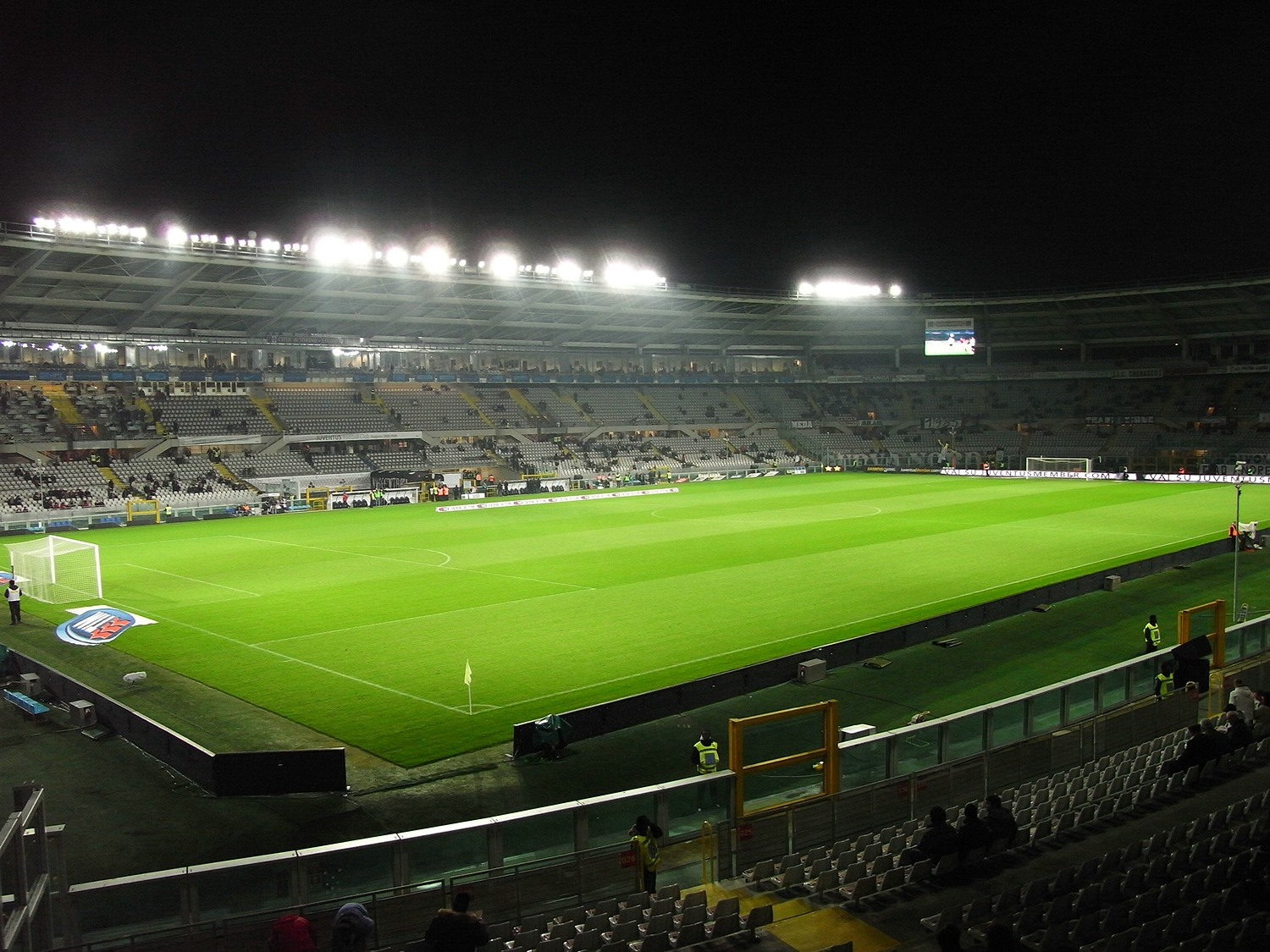
Stadio Olimpico di Torino (Turin Olympic Stadium) as a football venue in 2008. For the 2006 Winter Olympics, it hosted the opening and closing ceremonies.

For the 2006 Winter Olympics in Turin, Italy, a total of fifteen sports venues were used. Venue construction ran from 2002 to 2005. Cesana Pariol had to have turns 17 and 18 modified following the Luge World Cup in January 2005, but they were not cleared out until October 2005. Winds postponed the Nordic combined team event for a day. Many of the venues served as host for the Winter Universidade the following year.

== Venues ==
=== City ===
Venue	Sports	Capacity	Ref.
Oval Lingotto	Speed skating	8,250	
Palavela	Figure skating, short track speed skating	8,000	
Palasport Olimpico	Ice hockey (final)	12,500	
Stadio Olimpico Grande Torino	Ceremonies (opening/closing)	35,000	
Torino Esposizioni	Ice hockey	5,400	

=== Mountain ===
Venue	Sports	Capacity	Ref.
Bardonecchia	Snowboarding	6,763	
Cesana Pariol	Bobsleigh, luge, skeleton	4,400	
Cesana San Sicario	Biathlon	4,700	
Pinerolo Palaghiaccio	Curling	2,000	
Pragelato	Nordic combined (ski jumping), ski jumping	8,055	
Pragelato Plan	Cross-country skiing, Nordic combined (cross-country skiing)	5,400	
San Sicario Fraiteve	Alpine skiing (women's combined (downhill), downhill, super-G)	6,160	
Sauze d'Oulx-Jouvencaux	Freestyle skiing	7,900	
Sestriere Borgata	Alpine skiing (men's combined (downhill), downhill, super-G)	6,800	
Sestriere Colle	Alpine skiing (combined (slalom), giant slalom, slalom)	7,900	

== Before the Olympics ==
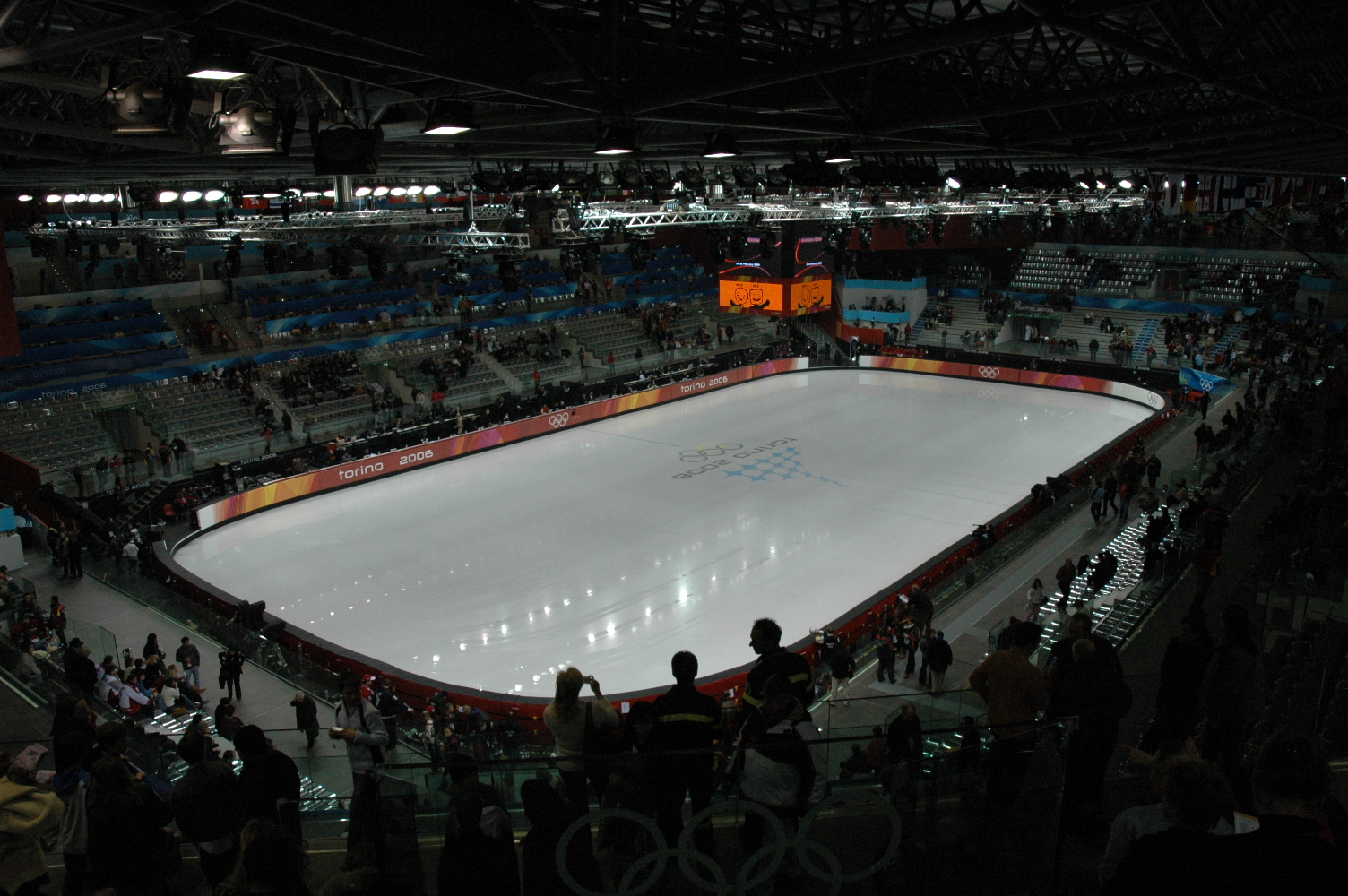
Palavela during the 2006 Winter Olympics. The venue hosted the figure skating and short track speed skating events during those games.

Stadio Olimpico in 1934 was known as Stadio Benito Mussolini. For the FIFA World Cup that took place that year, the stadium hosted two matches, including the quarterfinal match between Czechoslovakia and Switzerland.

Turin was selected by the Italian Olympic Committee to be selected to host the 2006 Winter Olympics in March 1998. It was awarded the 2006 Winter Olympics on 19 June 1999.

Cesana Pariol construction began in 2002 and was completed in 2004. After a Luge World Cup test event in January 2005 that was abandoned to accidents. This led to modifications of Turns 17 and 18 and a retest of the track that was approved by the International Luge Federation (FIL) in October 2005. Oval Lingotto opened on 9 December 2005. Palavela, constructed in 1961, was modified for the 2006 Games to host figure skating and short track speed skating events. San Sicario Fraiteve hosted an Alpine Skiing World Cup in February 2005, and was modified to make the women's super-G event more challenging. Torino Esposizinoi was constructed in 1949 and refurbished in time for the 2006 Games to host the preliminary ice hockey matches.

Venues were selected between May 2001 and the summer of 2002. Construction of the venues ran between the summers of 2002 and 2005. The venues were turned over for use of the 2006 Games between the summer of 2005 and February 2006. New construction included Cesana Pariol, Cesana San Sicario, Pragelato, Pragelato Plan, and Sauze d'Ouix-Jouvencaux while the other venues used were refurbished or expanded. Sustainability efforts were applied on all venues, but the most noted in the Olympics report were Cesana Pariol and Pragelato Plan. The most expensive venue construction in the Mountain area was Cesana Pariol at €85.78 million while the most expensive city venue used for competition in the City area was Oval Lingotto at €74.27 million.

== During the Olympics ==
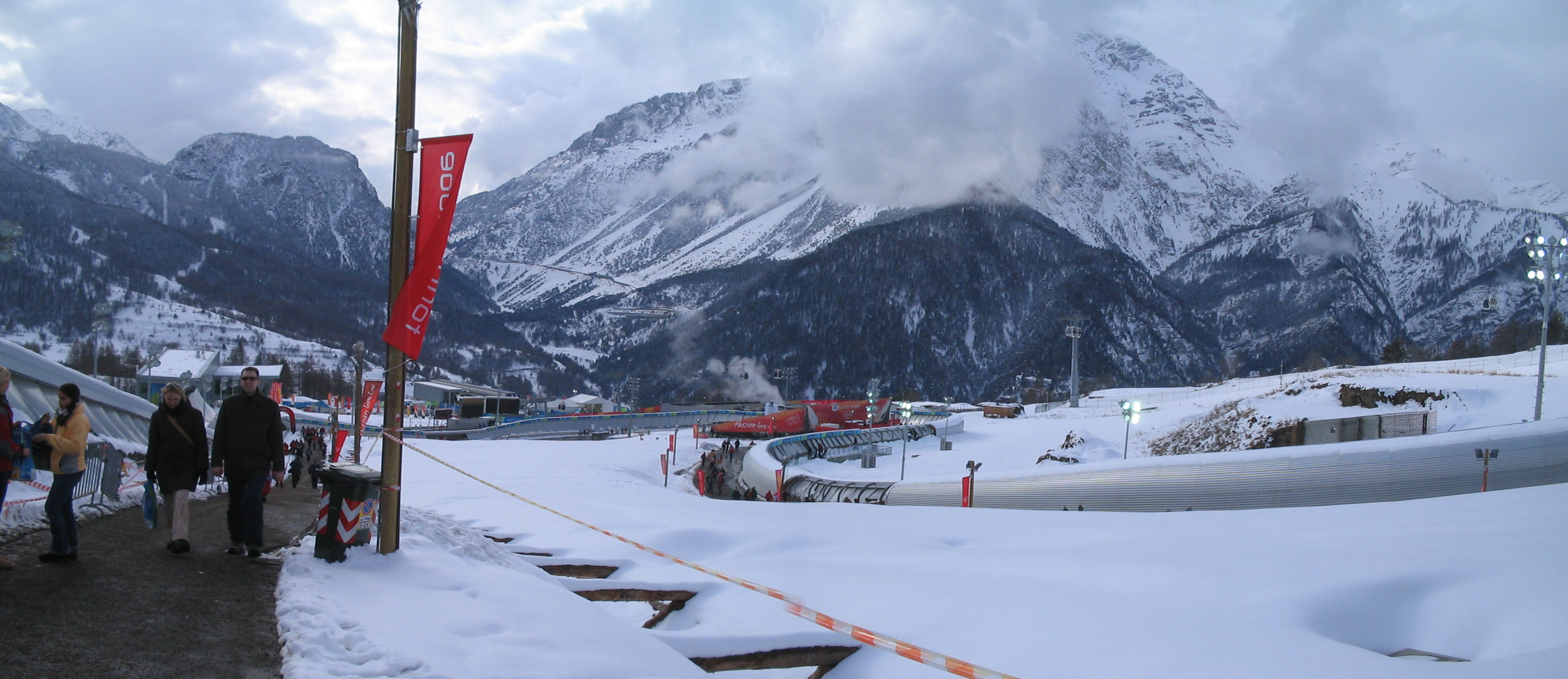
Picture of turns 15 through 19 (right to left) of Cesana Pariol during the 2006 Winter Olympics. Bobsleigh, luge, and skeleton events took place at this venue.

The men's curling bronze medal match at Pinerolo between Great Britain and the United States was interrupted by a streaker wearing a rubber chicken as a loin cloth.

At Cesana Pariol, the women's singles luge event had thirteen crashes or near crashes during the four runs. Among those who crashed were American Samantha Retrosi who was knocked unconscious at the end of the second run while Italy's Anastasia Oberstolz-Antonova crashed out during the first run.

During the men's super-G alpine skiing event at Sestriere Borgata, seventeen skiers had gone down the course in the morning portion of the event before it was halted to heavy snowfall. The event was restarted in the afternoon with all morning results cancelled. Norway's Kjetil André Aamodt won the event.

San Sicario Fraiteve had its women's downhill alpine skiing course modified at the request of Austria's Michaela Dorfmeister who complained that the course was too easy. Modifications included bigger jumps and steeper banks and it was after a women's super-G event that was a test event in 2005.

During the ski jumping portion of the Nordic combined team event, it was postponed halfway through to strong winds. They resumed the next day with Germany having a 10-second lead over Austria going into the cross-country portion of the event. At the halfway point of the final leg, Austria's Mario Stecher overcame a 20-second deficit to defeat Germany's Jens Gaiser by 15.3 seconds.

== After the Olympics ==
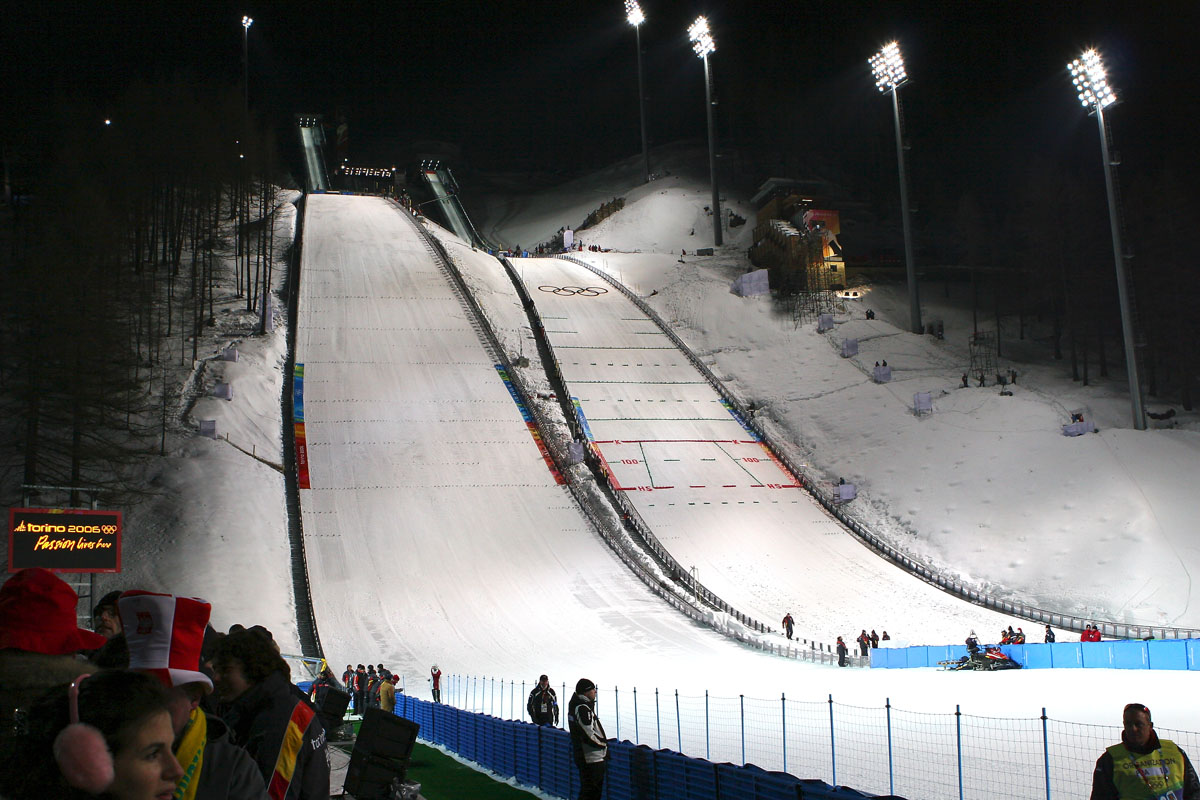
Pragelato ski jump during the 2006 Winter Olympics. The venue hosted the ski jumping and the ski jumping portion of the Nordic combined events.

Oval Lingotto hosted the World Fencing Championships in 2006. Several of the venues used for the 2006 Games were also used for the Winter Universiade the following year. They included Bardonecchia, Pragelato, Cesana San Sicario, Palavela, Pinerolo, and Oval Lingotto. San Sicario Friateve's last World Cup event in alpine skiing was in 2007. Pragelato's last World Cup ski jumping event was in 2008. Bardonecchia's last snowboarding World Cup event was in 2009. Palavela hosted the World Figure Skating Championships in 2010. Cesana Pariol hosted the FIL European Luge Championships in 2008 and the FIL World Luge Championships three years later.
