= Claviere =

- Comune
- Comune di Claviere
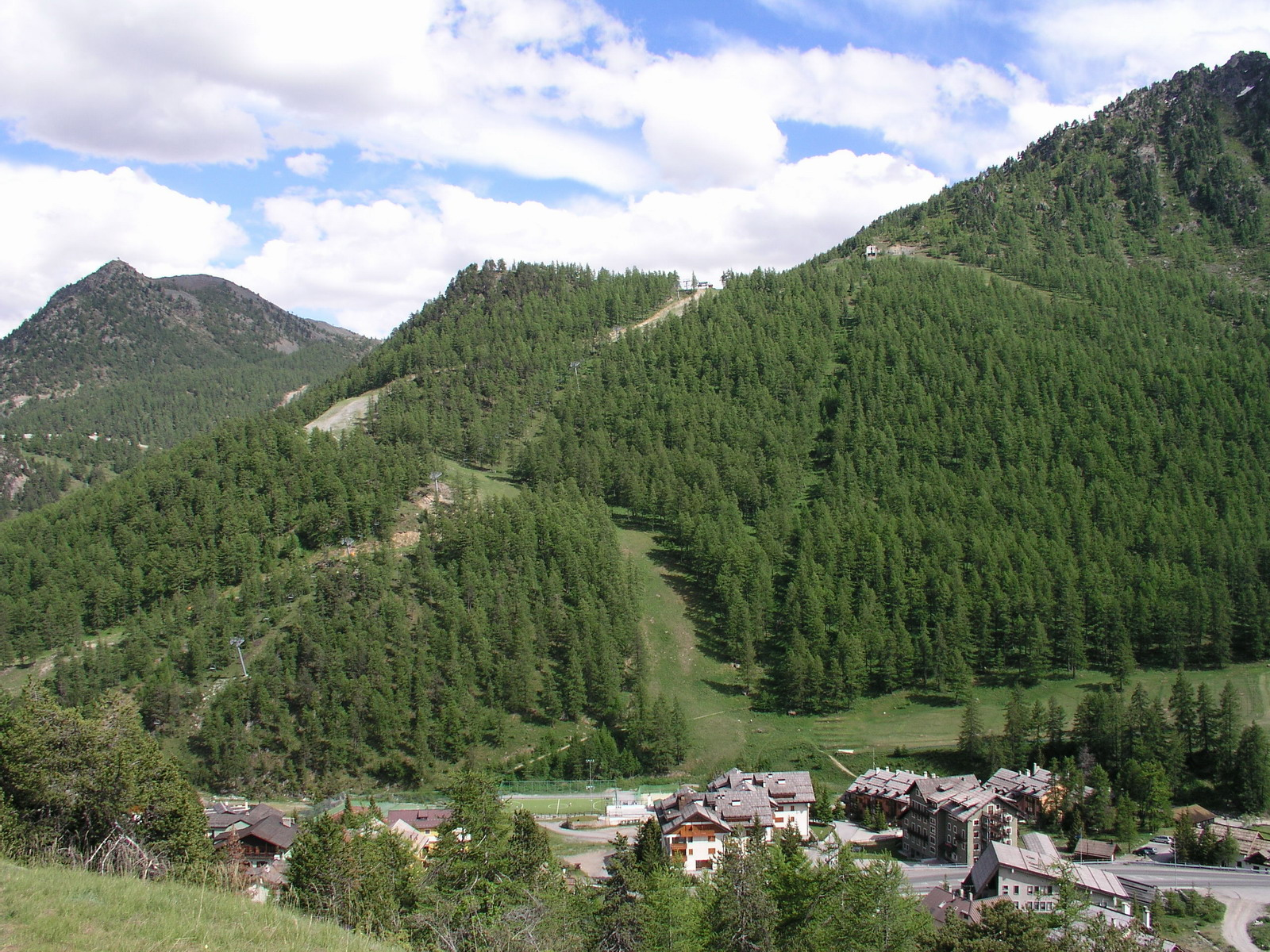

- Coat of arms

- Location within Italy Location within Piedmont
- Coordinates: 44°56′N 6°45′E
- Country: Italy
- Region: Piedmont
- Metropolitan city: Turin (TO)

Government
  - Mayor: Simona Radogna

Area
  - Total: 2.7 km^{2} (1.0 sq mi)
- Elevation: 1,760 m (5,770 ft)

Population (Dec. 2004)
  - Total: 176
  - Density: 65/km^{2} (170/sq mi)
- Demonym: Clavieresi
- Time zone: UTC+1 (CET)
  - Summer (DST): UTC+2 (CEST)
- Postal code: 10050
- Dialing code: 0122
- Website: Official website

Claviere (Piedmontese: Clavier; Occitan: Las Clavieras; French: Clavières, Clavière; Latin: Caprariae) is a municipality in the Metropolitan City of Turin in the Italian region of Piedmont, located about 80 kilometres (50 miles) west of the centre of Turin, on the border with France. Claviere is a small, but well equipped skiing village. The snow season lasts from December to April. The parish church has a Gothic-style portal.

== History ==
Claviere (known as Clavières until the early 19th century) was already known in Roman times due to its strategical position near the Col de Montgenèvre. In 1713, it was acquired by the Kingdom of Sardinia after the Peace of Utrecht. Claviere was mostly destroyed during World War II. After the conflict, the boundary between France and Italy was moved so that it divided the village in two. A more rational frontier, still advantaging France with respect to the pre-war situation, but without splitting the village anymore, was established in 1974.

== Resorts ==
Claviere is a part of the Via Lattea (Milky Way) ski area in Italy, where the 2006 Winter Olympics were held. Resorts linked include:

- Pragelato
- San Sicario
- Sestriere
- Sauze d'Oulx
- Montgenèvre
