= Via Lattea =

Region of the Italian and French Alps

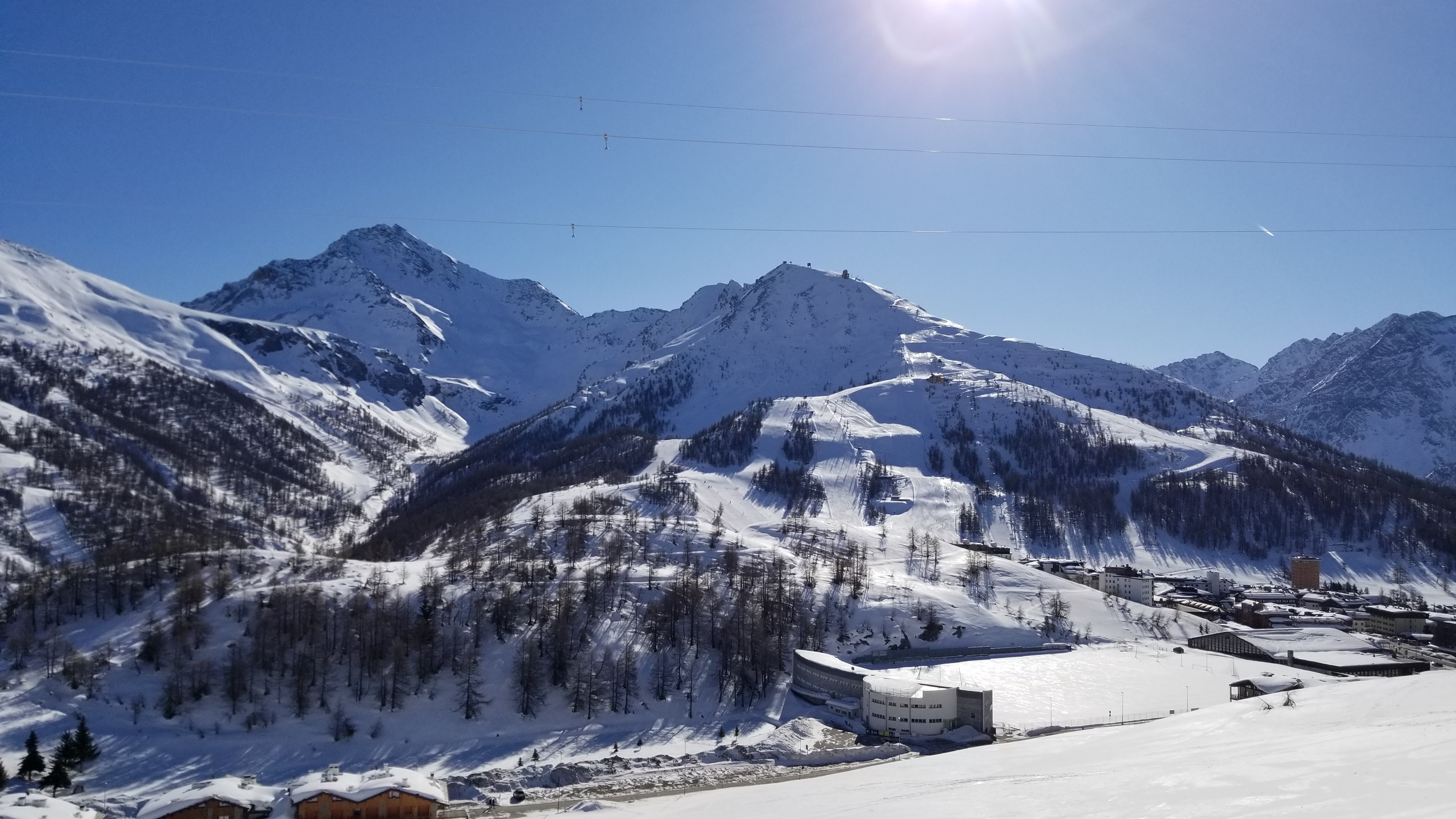
- Interactive map of Via Lattea
- Location: Piedmont, Italy
- Nearest city: Turin
- Coordinates: 44°58′N 6°52′E
- Vertical: 1,417 m (4,649 ft)
- Top elevation: 2,789 m (9,150 ft)
- Base elevation: 1,372 m (4,501 ft)
- Longest run: 7 km (4.3 mi) (to Sansicario Intermedia)
- Total length: 400 km (250 mi)
- Lift system: 69

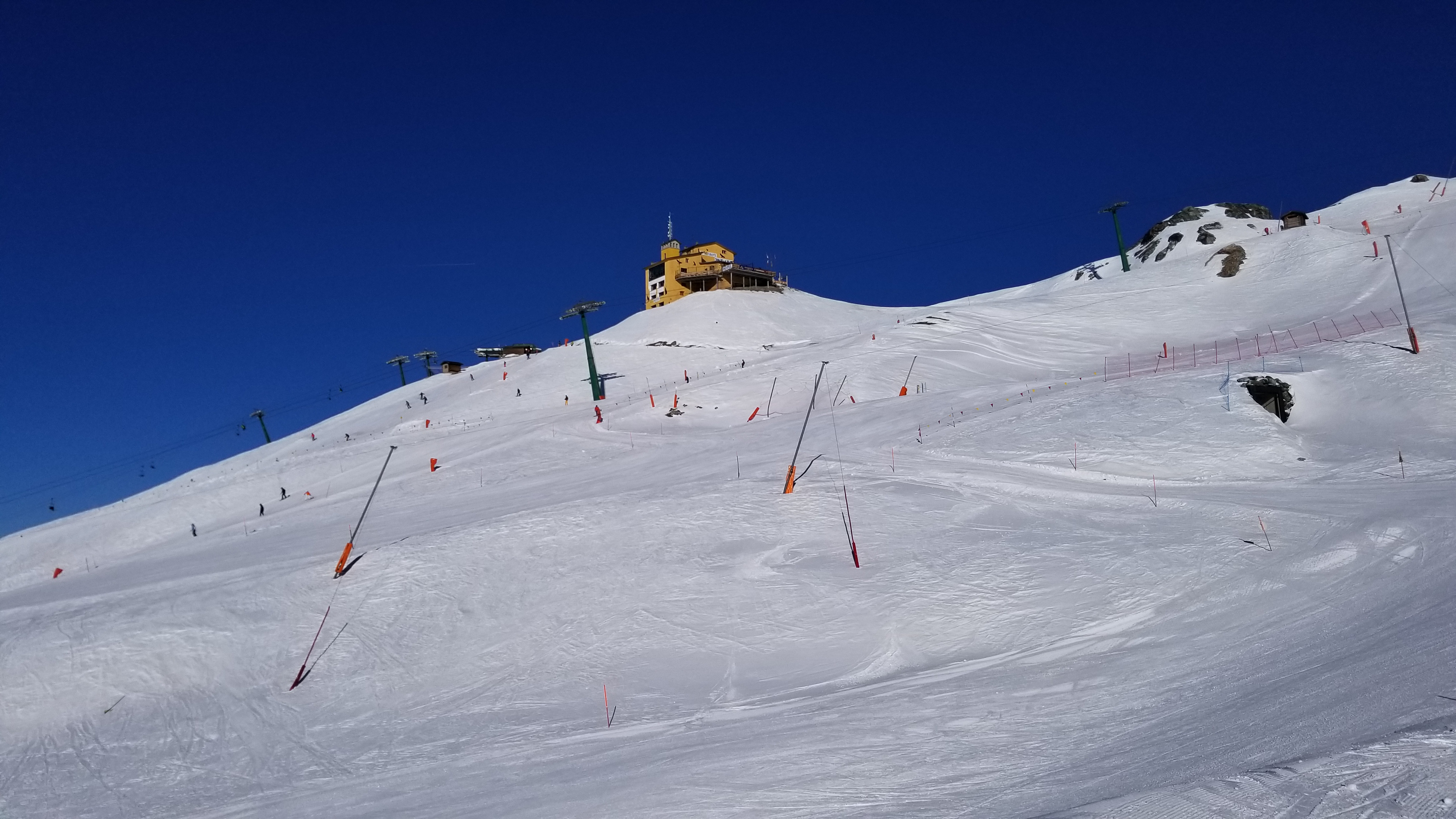
Hotel Tana Della Volpe at Sestriere

The Via Lattea (italian for Milky Way) is a winter sports area in the Italian and French Alps, straddling the French-Italian border at Claviere/Montgenèvre. Located some 70 km (44 miles) west of Turin, it comprises the five Piedmontese resorts of Claviere (1760m), Sansicario (1700m), Sauze d'Oulx (1509m), Pragelato (1524m) and Sestriere (2035m) and additionally the French resort Montgenèvre (1860m). Altogether there are more than 400 km (250 miles) of skiable pistes, 120 of them with artificial snow, and 70 lifts. The lowest lift begins at 1370m in the service village of Cesana Torinese; the highest point is Mont Motta in the Sestriere ski area, at 2800m. Claviere and Montgenèvre are connected by skiing and ski lifts. The 2006 Winter Olympics had the alpine ski events in the Via Lattea , on Sestriere and Sansicario slopes and most other snow events and bobsleigh nearby. The 2030 Winter Olympics will have alpine ski events on the French side.
