= Briançonnais =

Briançonnais may refer to:

- the people of Briançon
- Briançonnais (natural region), a natural region of France
- Briançonnais zone, a piece of continental crust

== See also ==
- Republic of the Escartons, sometimes called the Briançonnais
