= Montgenèvre =

Montgenèvre Montginebre (Occitan)
- Commune
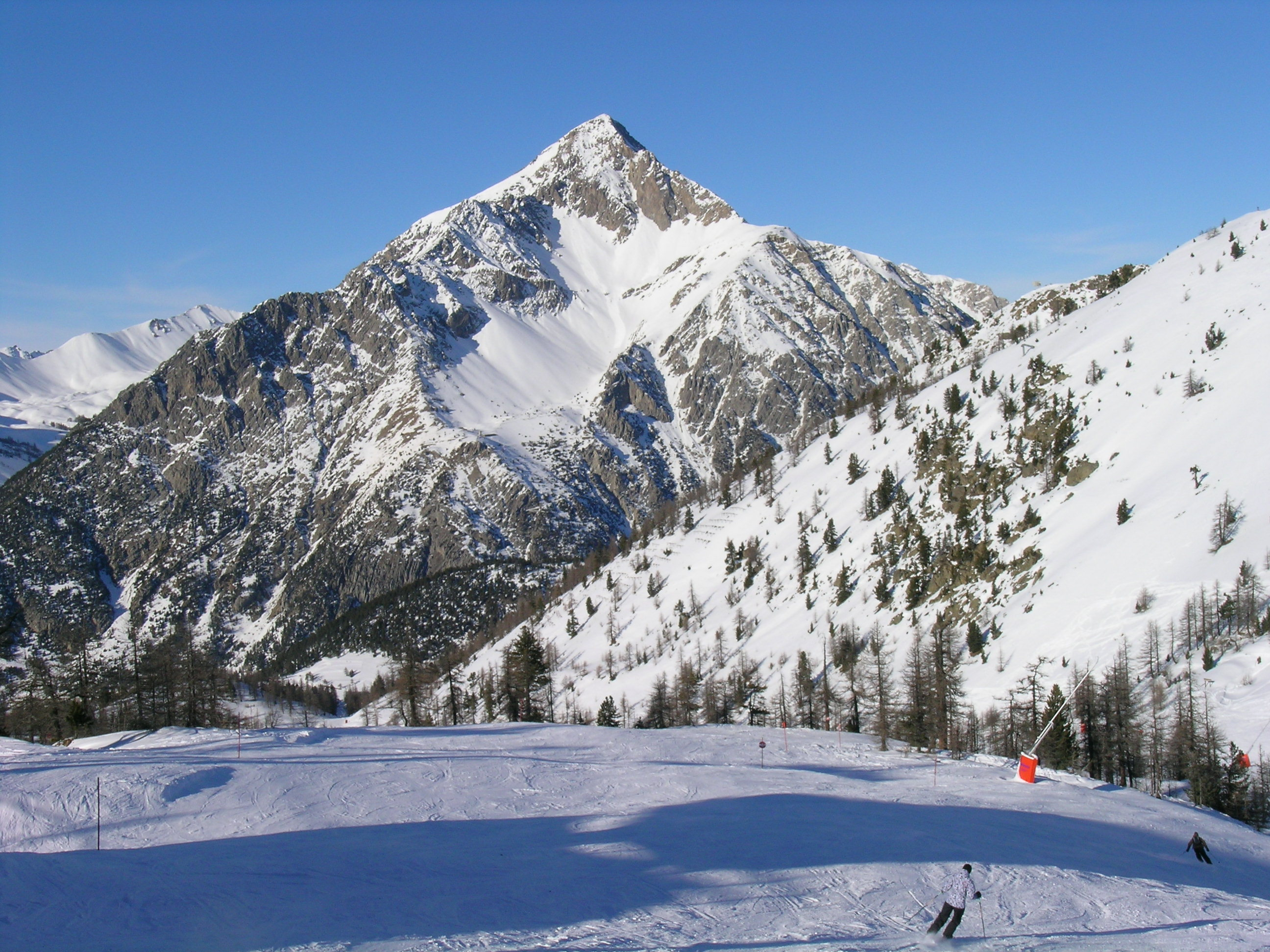
- A view of Mont Chaberton in Montgenèvre

- Flag Coat of arms
- Location of Montgenèvre
- Location within France Location within Provence-Alpes-Côte d'Azur
- Coordinates: 44°55′54″N 6°43′19″E
- Country: France
- Region: Provence-Alpes-Côte d'Azur
- Department: Hautes-Alpes
- Arrondissement: Briançon
- Canton: Briançon-2
- Intercommunality: Briançonnais

Government
  - Mayor (2026–32): Muriel Jourdain
- Area^{1}: 52 km^{2} (20 sq mi)
- Elevation: 1,789 m (5,869 ft)
- Highest elevation: 2,579 m (8,461 ft)
- Lowest elevation: 1,267 m (4,157 ft)
- Population (2023): 461
  - Density: 8.9/km^{2} (23/sq mi)
- Time zone: UTC+01:00 (CET)
  - Summer (DST): UTC+02:00 (CEST)
- INSEE/Postal code: 05085 /05100
- ^{1} French Land Register data, which excludes lakes, ponds, glaciers > 1 km^{2} (0.386 sq mi or 247 acres) and river estuaries.

Montgenèvre (French pronunciation: [mɔ̃ʒənɛvʁ]; Occitan: Montginebre; Italian: Monginevro) is a commune on the Italian border in the Hautes-Alpes department in the Provence-Alpes-Côte d'Azur region in Southeastern France.

It will host freestyle skiing and snowboarding during the 2030 Winter Olympics.

== Geography ==
Montgenèvre is located in the French part of the Cottian Alps. It is on the France–Italy border at the top of the Col de Montgenèvre, after which it is named. The source of the river Durance is in Les Gondrans ski area of Mongenèvre; the river is a tributary of the Rhône.

=== Ski area ===
Montgenèvre is a ski resort. It is linked to the Via Lattea ("Milky Way") ski area, which has 410 km (254.7 mi) of pistes. Montgenevre's own ski areas have 95 km (59.03 mi) of pistes comprising 9 green, 22 blue, 38 red, and 9 black slopes. The resort is famed for its sunshine and good snow records; it is renowned for intermediates with ski to door accommodation. The village is situated at 1,860 metres (5,102 feet), but the resort height begins at 1,722 metres (4,979), while its highest point is 2,632 metres (7,530 feet). It was built in 1907 and celebrated its centenary year in 2003. It claims to be one of the first ski resorts in France. The town lacks night life, which makes it family friendly.

Snowboard facilities include a half pipe, a snow park, and two border-crosses. There are 23 lifts: 3 gondolas, 2 telemix, 10 chair lifts, 7 drag lifts, and 1 magic carpet. There are 78 slopes in Montgenèvre. There is also more than 70 km (43.4 mi) of cross-country skiing terrain. In the Monts de la Lune ski area, which is the connection between Montgenèvre and Claviere-Cesana, there are 30 lifts and 87 slopes, including 9 green, 25 blue, 43 red and 10 black runs.

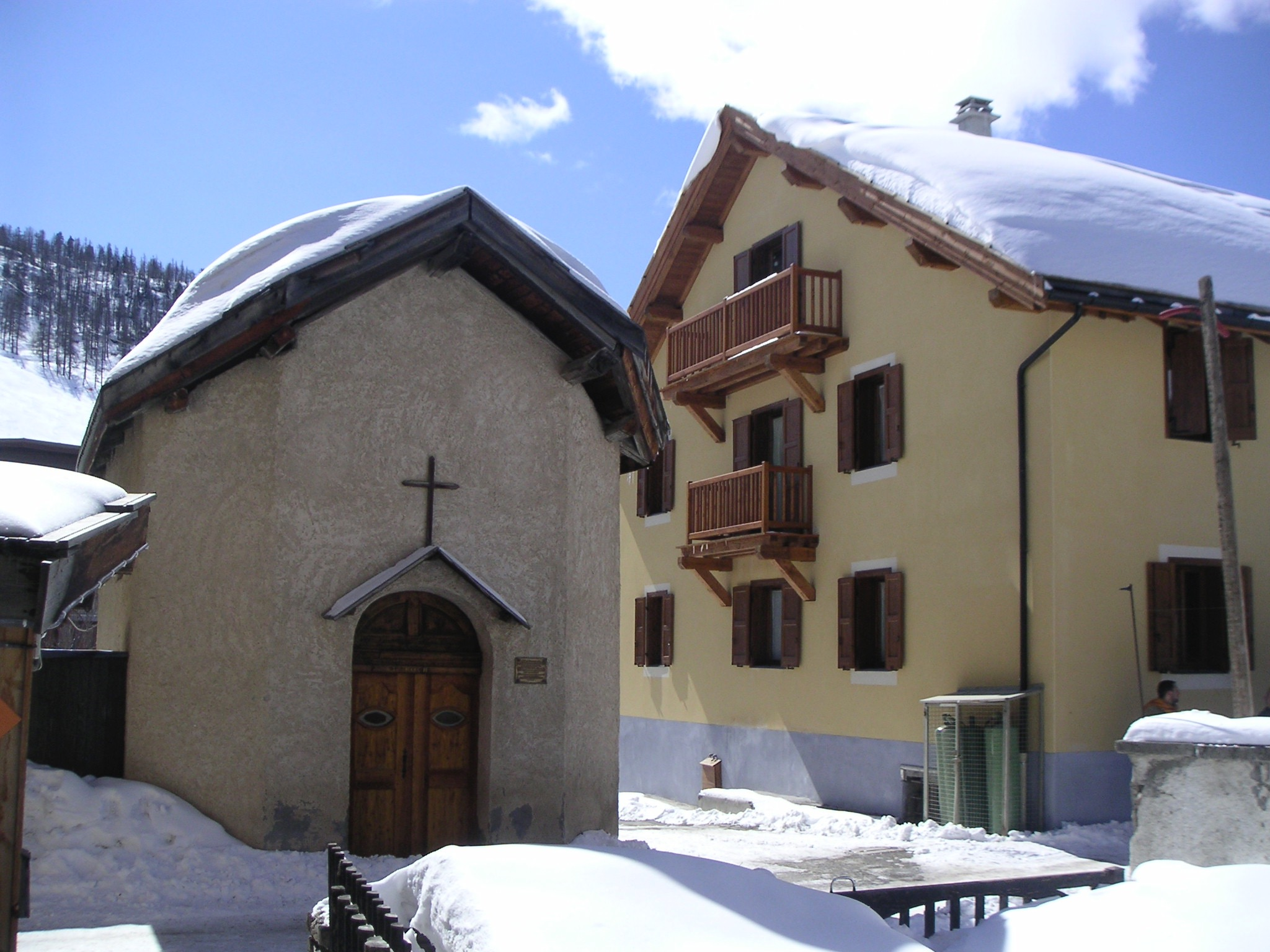
Chapelle Saint-Roch in March 2008

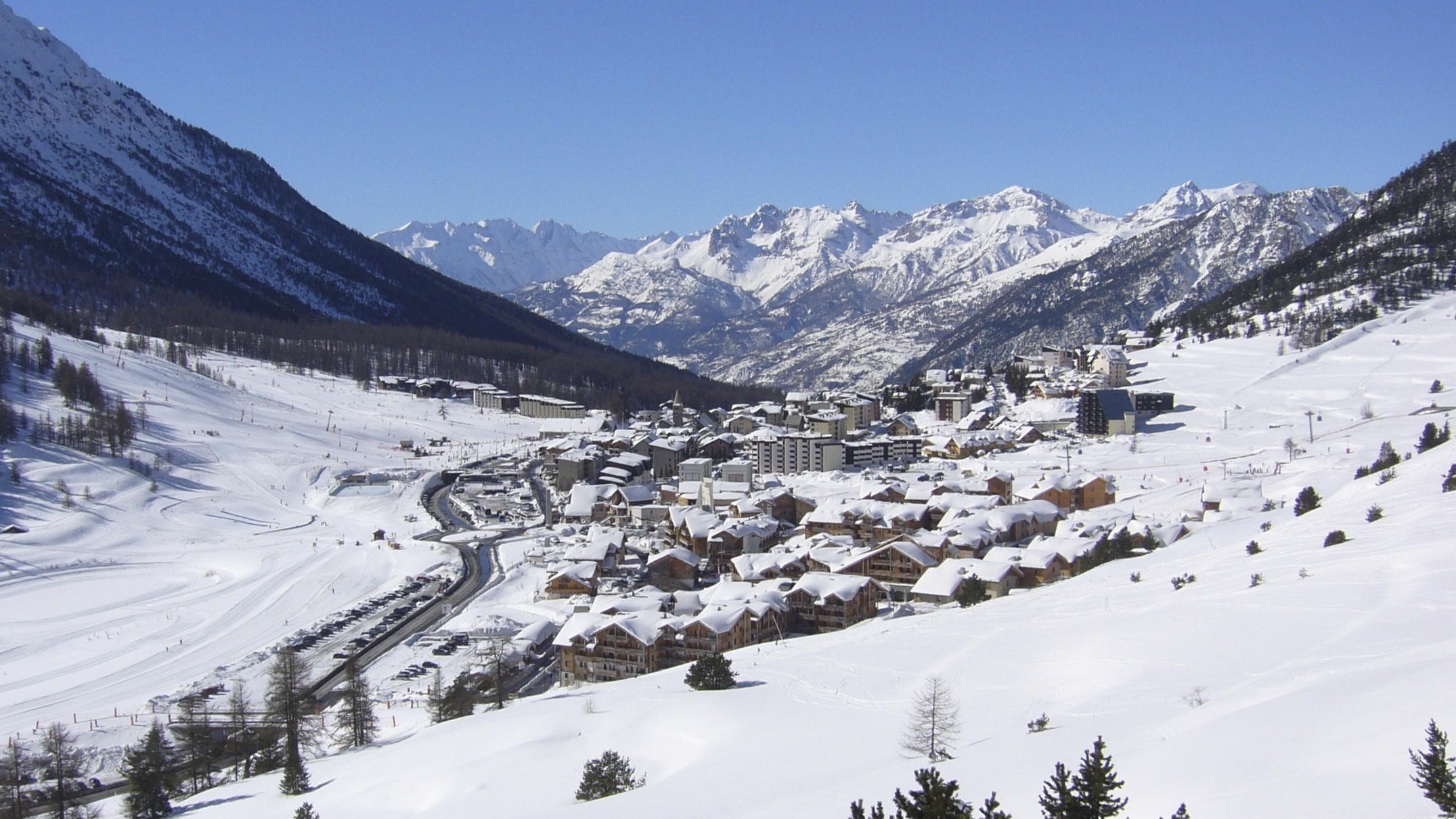
Montgenèvre in February 2014

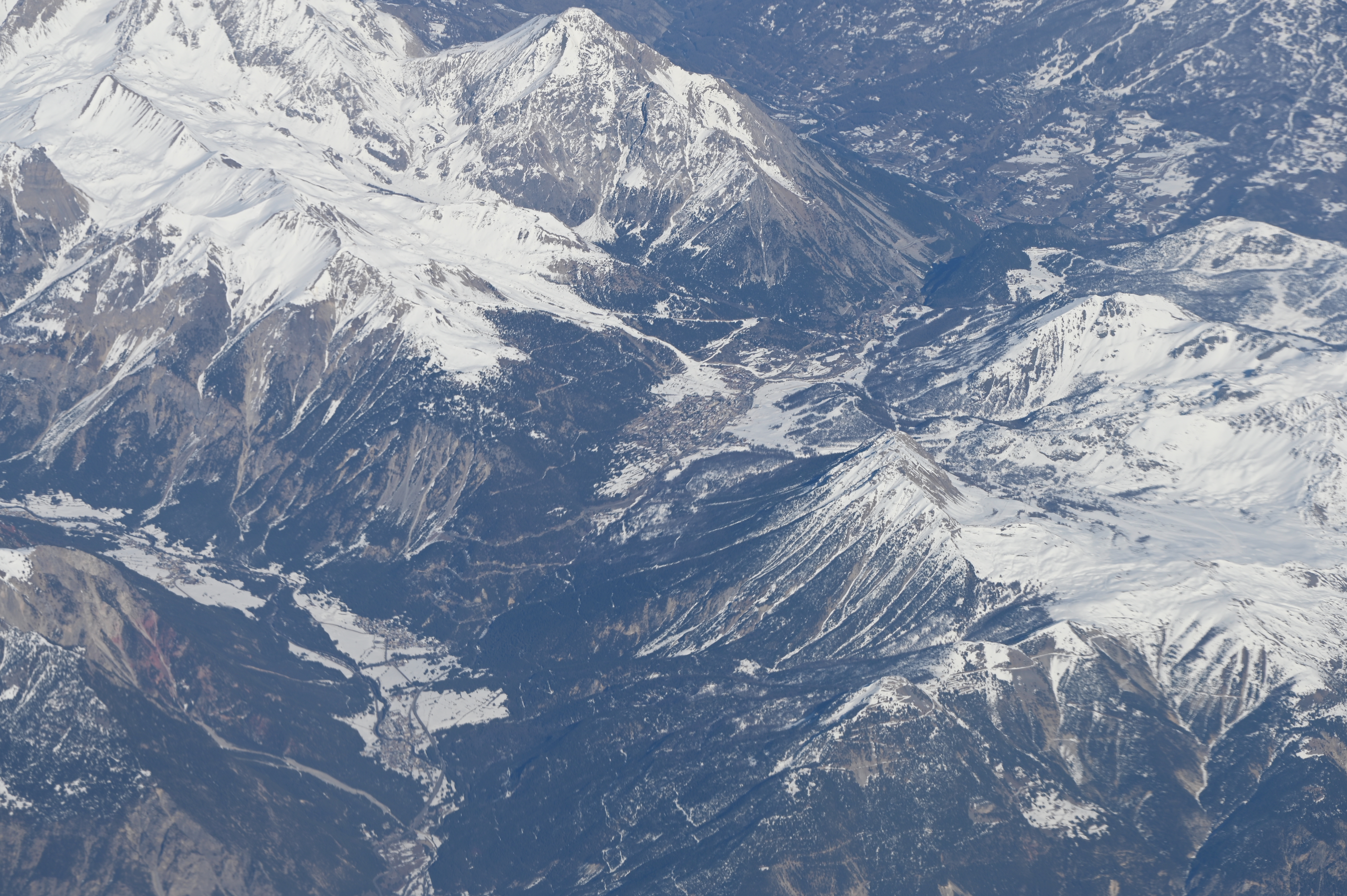
Montgenèvre from 36,000 feet in 2023

=== Climate ===
Montgenèvre has a subarctic climate (Köppen climate classification Dfc). The average annual temperature in Montgenèvre is 4.7 °C (40.5 °F). The average annual rainfall is 773.7 mm (30.46 in) with October as the wettest month. The temperatures are highest on average in July, at around 13.8 °C (56.8 °F), and lowest in January, at around −2.9 °C (26.8 °F). The highest temperature ever recorded in Montgenèvre was 28.2 °C (82.8 °F) on 20 August 2012; the coldest temperature ever recorded was −25.0 °C (−13.0 °F) on 6 March 1971.

Climate data for Montgenèvre (1981–2010 averages, extremes 1970−2015)
Month	Jan	Feb	Mar	Apr	May	Jun	Jul	Aug	Sep	Oct	Nov	Dec	Year
Record high °C (°F)	13.2 (55.8)	15.6 (60.1)	17.9 (64.2)	18.5 (65.3)	26.6 (79.9)	26.2 (79.2)	27.5 (81.5)	28.2 (82.8)	26.6 (79.9)	21.1 (70.0)	18.3 (64.9)	15.0 (59.0)	28.2 (82.8)
Mean daily maximum °C (°F)	1.3 (34.3)	2.4 (36.3)	4.7 (40.5)	7.0 (44.6)	12.3 (54.1)	16.5 (61.7)	19.4 (66.9)	19.4 (66.9)	14.4 (57.9)	9.6 (49.3)	4.2 (39.6)	1.3 (34.3)	9.4 (48.9)
Daily mean °C (°F)	−2.9 (26.8)	−2.5 (27.5)	−0.1 (31.8)	2.5 (36.5)	7.6 (45.7)	11.2 (52.2)	13.8 (56.8)	13.8 (56.8)	9.5 (49.1)	5.4 (41.7)	0.4 (32.7)	−2.6 (27.3)	4.7 (40.5)
Mean daily minimum °C (°F)	−7.1 (19.2)	−7.4 (18.7)	−4.9 (23.2)	−2.0 (28.4)	2.8 (37.0)	6.0 (42.8)	8.3 (46.9)	8.2 (46.8)	4.5 (40.1)	1.3 (34.3)	−3.4 (25.9)	−6.4 (20.5)	0.0 (32.0)
Record low °C (°F)	−20.4 (−4.7)	−20.2 (−4.4)	−25.0 (−13.0)	−15.0 (5.0)	−8.4 (16.9)	−5.0 (23.0)	−1.0 (30.2)	−1.0 (30.2)	−7.0 (19.4)	−12.5 (9.5)	−17.5 (0.5)	−20.0 (−4.0)	−25.0 (−13.0)
Average precipitation mm (inches)	61.9 (2.44)	50.9 (2.00)	53.4 (2.10)	69.8 (2.75)	70.7 (2.78)	69.1 (2.72)	49.1 (1.93)	53.1 (2.09)	68.3 (2.69)	85.9 (3.38)	69.1 (2.72)	72.4 (2.85)	773.7 (30.46)
Average precipitation days (≥ 1.0 mm)	6.7	5.9	7.2	9.2	9.8	9.6	7.6	8.1	7.6	9.1	7.4	7.5	94.9
Source: Meteociel

== Winter activities ==
The winter season starts in late November and closes in late April.

- Alpine Skiing - 85 km in the resort with many lifts and snow-making facilities.
- Snowboarding - There is a half pipe and many wide slopes for the boarders.
- Slaloming - There is a slalom course, which has regular competitions.
- Cross Country Skiing - 70 km of terrain where the French national team train.
- Heli-Skiing - There are trips organised for the powder on peaks in both Italy and France.
- Telemark Skiing - Involves walking up the mountain on skis and skiing back down for the super fit.
- Snow-shoeing - There are numerous beautiful walks across the mountain-sides if you don't feel like skiing.
- Snowmobiling - every night there are octane-fuelled adrenaline rides through the mountains.
- Sledging - There is a moving walkway to take you up the beginner slopes in the day. Many people sledge during the evening.
- Ice Skating
- Ski Tuition

There are two ski schools in the resort. They are ESF and A-PEAK.

APEAK ski school has a team of 15 instructors all fluent in English, Italian and even Dutch for some of them. They all provide tuition and guiding adapted to the skills of their students.

ESF has 900 instructors, and offer alpine skiing, cross country skiing, snow shoeing and heli-skiing activities as well as trips to Serre Chevalier and to the Olympic facilities. There is a snow garden when 4-year-olds and children older can experience skiing.

== Summer activities ==
- Golf - An international 18 hole golf course on the beginner slopes. This border golf course has nine holes in France and nine in Italy. There is also a driving range.
- Mountain Biking - Three lifts are open in the summer for bikers and there is a bike park which has recently been built.
- Kayaking/Rafting - Down stream on the Durance towards Briancon there is a gorge where clubs from Briancon use the river. Many clubs which offer rafting/kayaking trips on the local rivers.
- Walking - Discover the forests, lakes, forts and the source of the mighty River Durance. You can see the flora and fauna of the mountain side. This includes eagles, marmottes, rabbits, chamois and deer.
- Fishing - There are numerous lakes at the bottom of the resort and up in the mountains. The main fish are trout.
- Canyoning - In the local gorges and torrents.
- Via Ferrata - Climbing and zip wires in the forest.
- Swimming - There is a swimming pool in the village.
- Tennis - There are six courts in the resort.
- Horse Riding - In Les Alberts there is Cheval Montagne, which take horse rides up the Claree Valley.

== Demographics ==
Historical population
Year	Pop.	±% p.a.
1968	264	—
1975	338	+3.59%
1982	459	+4.47%
1990	519	+1.55%
1999	497	−0.48%
2007	466	−0.80%
2012	530	+2.61%
2017	456	−2.96%
2023	461	+0.18%
Source: INSEE

== Transport ==
=== Roads ===
The RN94 which climbs up the Col de Montgenèvre runs through the village. A tunnel was built before the Turin Olympics back in 2006 to divert through traffic under the village, making the resort more peaceful. The road runs to Briançon and Oulx. There is a road to Grenoble from Briançon on the RN91 over the Col du Lautaret.

Calais Ferry Port is a 10-hour 30 minutes drive away on French Motorways.

=== Aeroplane ===
The nearest international airport is Turin International Airport, 1 hour and 25 minutes drive (101 km) away. Grenoble-Isère Airport is 222 km away and a 2-hour 25 minutes drive away from the resort.

=== Train ===
There is a bus to Oulx Railway station in the Susa Valley. This station serves the TGV line between Milan - Turin - Modane - Paris. Paris is 4 1/2 hours away from Oulx.

There is an SNCF train station in the nearby French town of Briançon, which has a train service to Gap, Valence TGV, Lyon and Paris.

=== Bus ===
There is a bus service which connects the resort to Briançon and Oulx railway station. There is also a village bus for skiers so that they can return to their accommodation which runs between 8.30 and 18.00. There are 3 buses a day to the village of Les Alberts at the foot of the Col de Montgenèvre in the Val Claree.

== Linked resorts ==
It is a part of the Via Lattea Milky Way ski area in Italy, where the 2006 Winter Olympics were held.

Pragelato - The resort is part of the Via Lattea (Milky Way) ski area, and is connected to it by the cableway Pattemouche - Anfiteatro built in 2006. Pragelato has cross-country skiing facilities, including a 10 km Olympic course equipped with snowmaking facilities and a tourist course running through the Val Troncea Natural Park. The resort also has a nine-hole golf course and offers a range of sporting and recreational activities during the summer. Its ski jumping stadium, built for the 2006 Winter Olympics, forms part of the resort's Olympic heritage.

Claviere - This small resort is just over the border in Italy and is included in the Monts de la lune lift pass. It is where the Olympic cross country ski teams practised in the Olympics in 2006.

San Sicario - They held the Biathlon and Alpine skiing events here in the 2006 winter Olympics. They also held the Bobsleigh and luge events here. You can attempt the Olympic women's super G and downhill courses.

Sestriere - This resort was founded by the owner of Fiat. It has been recently sold. The resort held the downhill skiing events and the Olympic village is situated in the village for the 2006 winter Olympics. You can attempt the men's Olympic downhill and super-G courses.

Sauze d'Oulx - Free Style Skiing Olympic events held here in 2006. The resort is acclaimed for its lively apres-ski.

Serre Chevalier - Nearby French resort with over 250 km of skiing slopes.

== See also ==
- List of ski areas and resorts in Europe
- Communes of the Hautes-Alpes department
