= Pragelato Plan =

Cross-country skiing venue in Italy

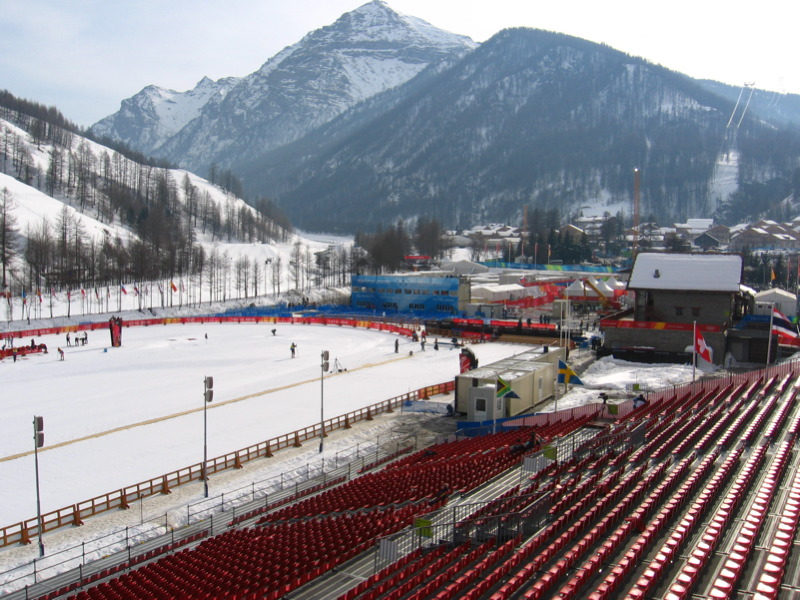
View from commentary boxes.

Pragelato Plan is a cross-country skiing venue located in Pragelato, Italy. It hosted the cross-country skiing and the cross-country skiing portion of the Nordic combined events for the 2006 Winter Olympics in neighboring Turin.

The two tracks which totaled 10 km (6.2 mi) were 6.2 km (3.9 mi) ("red") and 3.8 km (2.4 mi) ("yellow").
