= Sestriere =

- Comune
- Comune di Sestriere
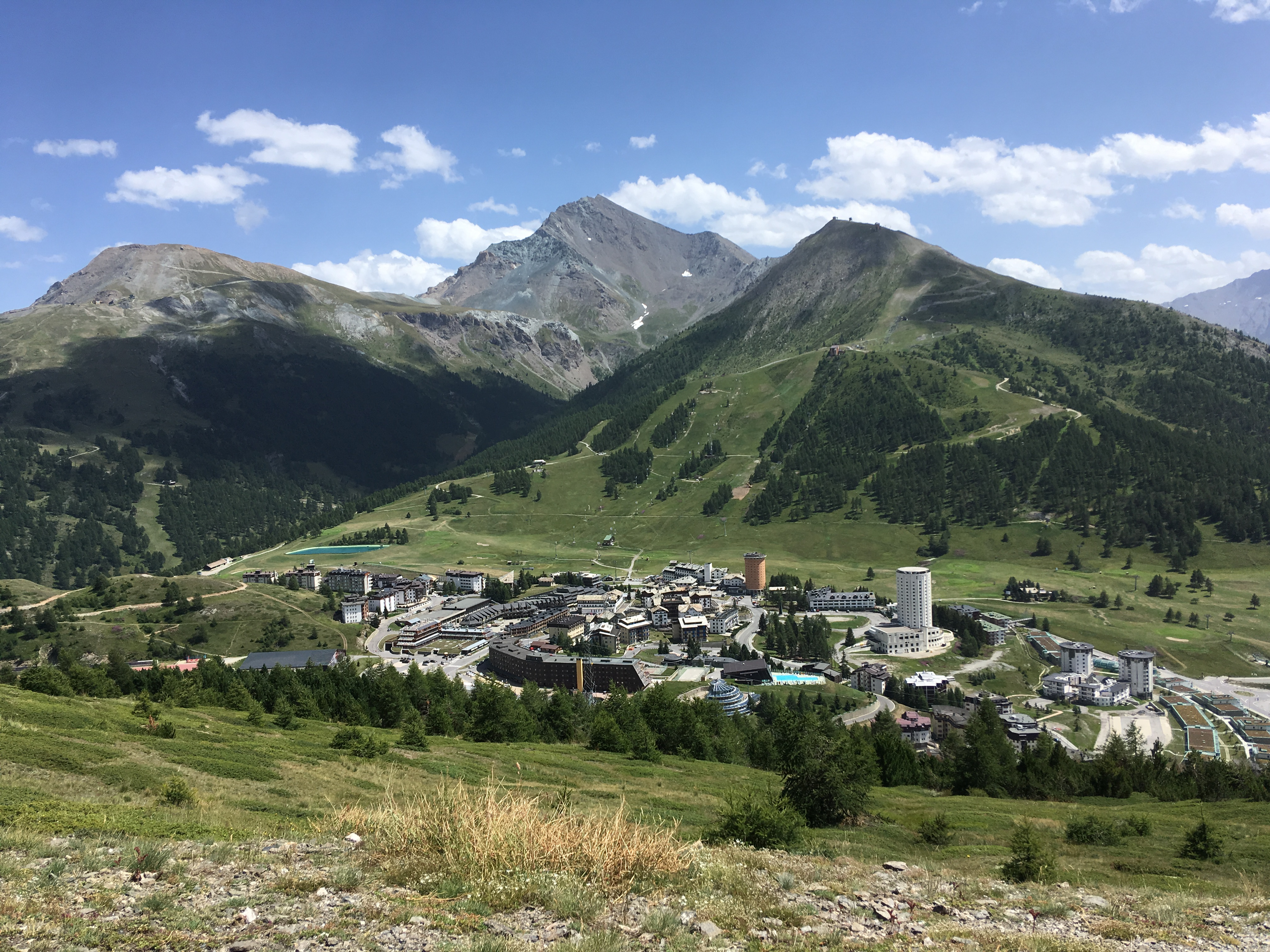
- Sestriere

- Coat of arms

- Location within Italy Location within Piedmont
- Coordinates: 44°57′N 6°53′E
- Country: Italy
- Region: Piedmont
- Metropolitan city: Turin (TO)
- Frazioni: Colle Sestriere, Borgata Sestriere, Champlas Du Col, Champlas Janvier

Government
  - Mayor: Giovanni Cesare Poncet

Area
  - Total: 25.92 km^{2} (10.01 sq mi)
- Elevation: 2,035 m (6,677 ft)

Population (1 January 2021)
  - Total: 929
  - Density: 35.8/km^{2} (92.8/sq mi)
- Demonym: Sestrierese(i)
- Time zone: UTC+1 (CET)
  - Summer (DST): UTC+2 (CEST)
- Postal code: 10058
- Dialing code: 0122
- Patron saint: Saint Edward
- Saint day: 13 October
- Website: Official website

Sestriere (Italian pronunciation: [sesˈtrjɛːre], Occitan: Sestrieras, Piedmontese: Ël Sestrier, French: Sestrières) is a ski resort in Piedmont, Italy, a comune (municipality) of the Metropolitan City of Turin. It is situated in Val Susa, 17 km (11 mi) from the French border. Its name derives from Latin: ad petram sistrariam, that is at sixty Roman miles from Turin.

== Geography ==
Sestriere has 929 inhabitants as of 1 January 2021 and is located on the pass that links Val Chisone and Val Susa, at 2,035 metres (6,677 feet) above mean sea level. The village is completely surrounded by mountains, which have been exploited to build one of the biggest ski resorts in Italy. The main mountains around Sestriere are: Monte Fraiteve 2,701 m (8,862 ft) in the north-east, Monte Sises 2,658 m (8,720 ft), Punta Rognosa di Sestriere 3,280 m (10,761 ft) and Monte Motta 2,850 m (9,350 ft) in the south-east. Sestriere is divided into several smaller hamlets: Sestriere Colle, on the pass top, Sestriere Borgata, in Val Chisone, Champlas du Col and Champlas Janvier, in Val Susa.

== History ==
Formerly, the pass belonged to the municipality of Cesana, but from 18 October 1934 the area was unified with the hamlet of Borgata (formerly belonging to Pragelato) to create the new municipality of Sestriere. The ski resorts at Sestriere were built in the 1930s by Giovanni Agnelli and have been further developed after the Second World War by his nephew Giovanni Nasi.

== Tourism ==
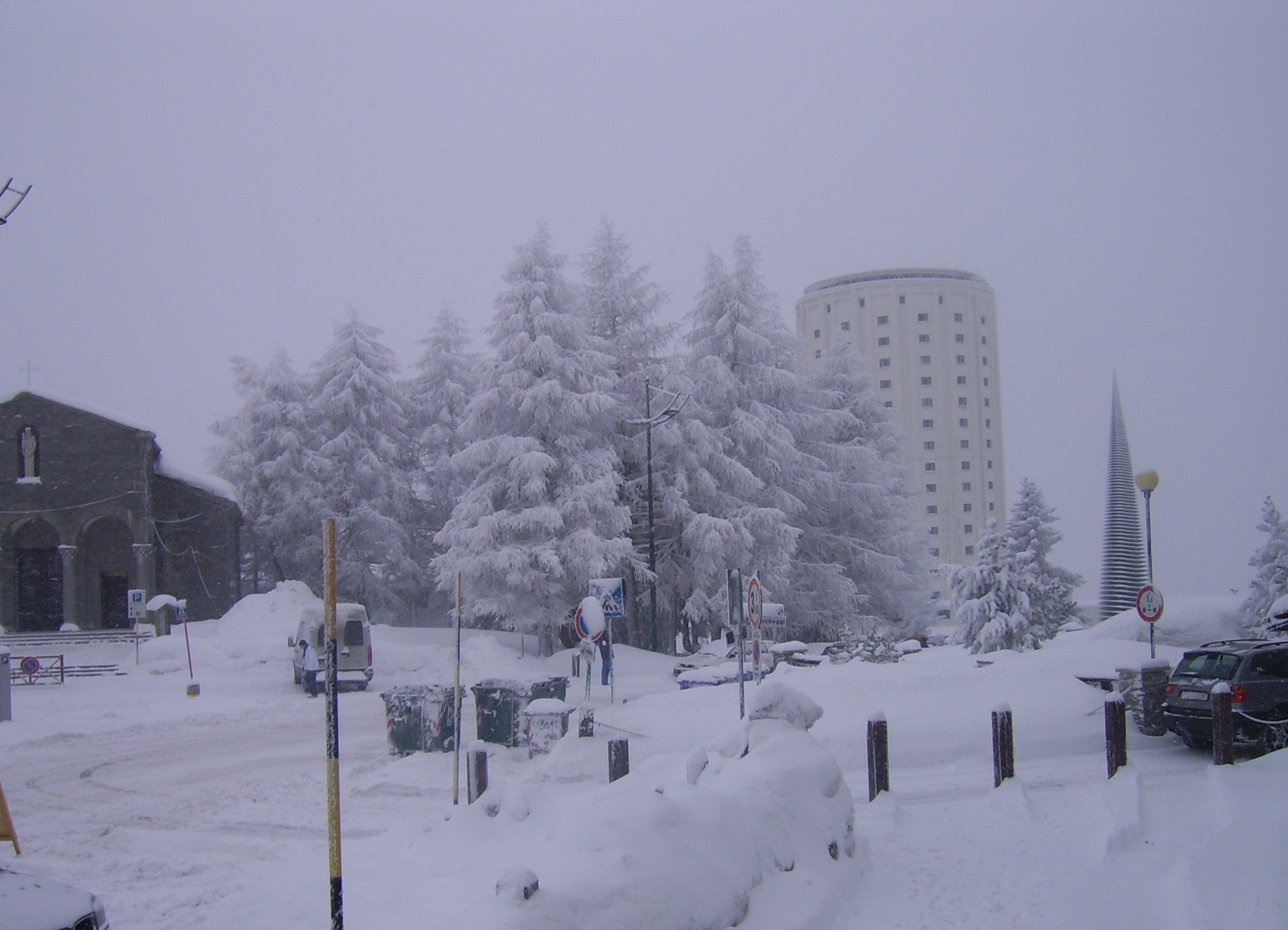
Sestriere in winter

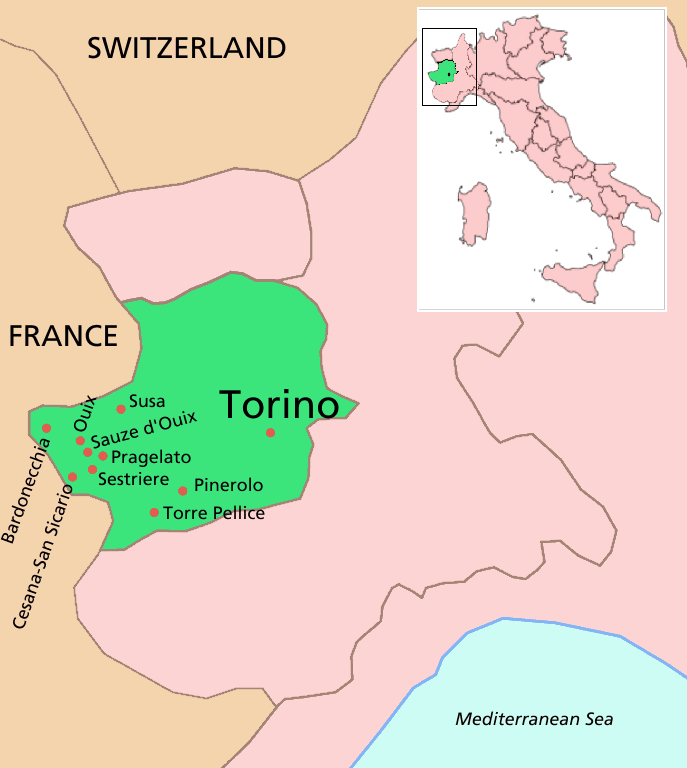
Location of Sestriere in the Metropolitan City of Turin

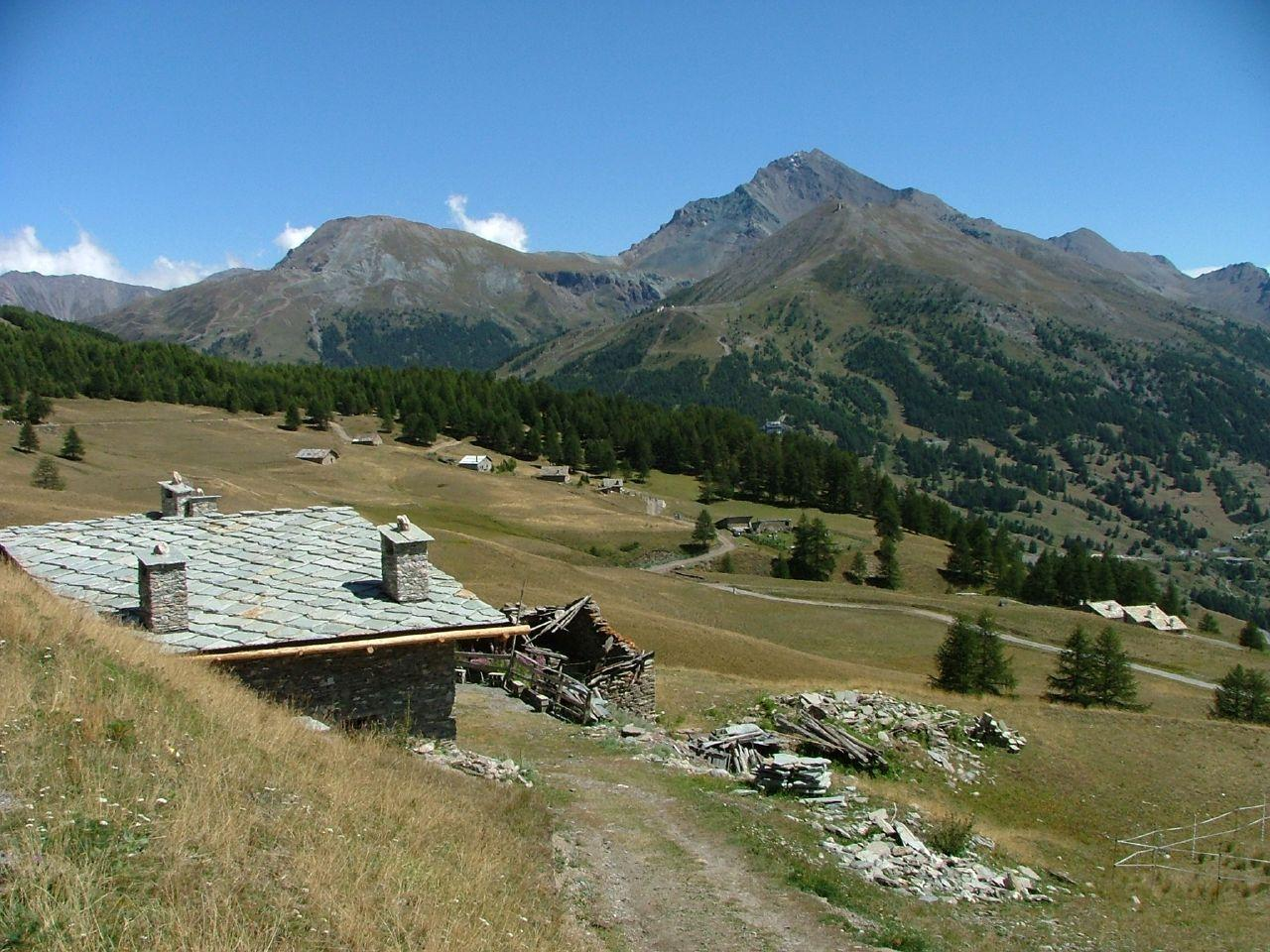
Mount Motta in Sestriere

=== Winter sports ===
Sestriere is a popular skiing resort; during the winter holidays the population goes up to about 20,000 people. Together with the villages of Pragelato, Claviere, Sauze d'Oulx, Cesana Torinese and San Sicario, and Montgenèvre in France, it makes up the Via Lattea (Milky Way) skiing area. Sestriere is connected to 146 skiable pistes, for a total of up to 400 km (249 mi) of trails, of which 120 are provided with artificial snow. Sestriere has also one of the few facilities where it is possible to ski at night on a floodlit run.

It regularly hosts FIS Alpine Ski World Cup events, and it hosted the FIS World Championships in 1997, and the IPC World Championships in 2011. It was a main venue during the 2006 Winter Olympic Games and the 2006 Winter Paralympics, hosting all the men's alpine skiing competitions and being the site of one of the three Olympic Villages. The two hotel towers, one of which was part of the Olympic Village, were built in the 1930s by FIAT's founder Giovanni Agnelli, and have become the symbol of the village; these were the first buildings of the village.

==== Linked resorts (Via Lattea) ====
Pragelato - the resort is part of the Via Lattea (Milky Way), is connected to this area by the Pattemouche-Anfiteatro cableway, built in 2006.

Claviere - This small resort is just over the border in Italy. It is where the Olympic cross country ski teams practised for the Olympics in 2006.

San Sicario - The biathlon and Alpine skiing events were held there in the 2006 Winter Olympic Games. They also held the bobsleigh and luge events here. One can attempt the Olympic women's super G and downhill courses.

Sauze d'Oulx - Free Style Skiing Olympic events held here in 2006.

Serre Chevalier - Nearby French resort with over 250 km (155 mi) of skiing.

Montgenèvre - Nearby French resort with over 85 km (53 mi) of pistes. Montgenevre's ski area has 8 green runs, 12 blue, 22 red and 10 black slopes and is linked to the Via Lattea (Milky Way) ski area.

=== Summer sports ===
In the summertime it is possible to play golf on Europe's highest 18-hole course.

It is also a starting and arrival point in the Tour de France and the Giro d'Italia.

One of the most exciting moments for Italian cycling fans occurred in 1992, on stage 13 of the Tour de France when Claudio Chiappucci went on a daring solo attack of 125km. No Italian rider had won the Tour since 1965 and Chiappucci was cheered on by enormous, enthusiastic crowds as he climbed to Sestriere. He won the stage in spectacular fashion and ended up finishing 2nd to Miguel Induráin.

It was the scene of the moment in Lance Armstrong's career when he rode away from the field in a breakaway uphill finish to take the stage in the 1999 Tour de France, which was the first time he won the race, although he was later stripped of his seven victories.

Due to its location across two valleys, Sestriere is close to several hiking paths.

An elite track and field athletics meeting was held annually in Sestriere from 1988 to 1996, and again in 2004. The advantage of its high altitude in sprinting and jumping events held out hope of world records, with sponsor Ferrari offering a car as a bonus. One record was set, in the men's pole vault by Sergey Bubka in 1994; the men's and women's records in long jump were also beaten, but wind assisted.

== Transportation ==
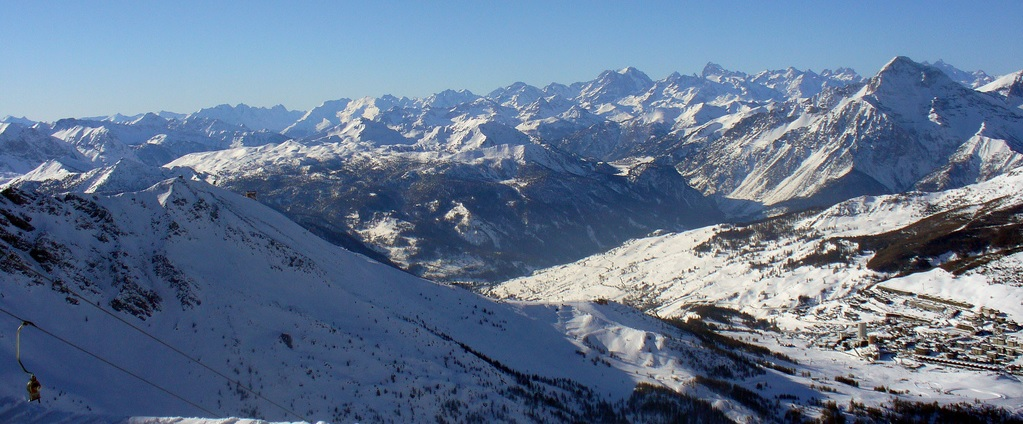
Panoramic view of Sestriere in Winter from Monte Motta

Due to its position, Sestriere can only be reached by car or bus.

Trains from Turin stop in Oulx (Val Susa). From there, several buses bring passengers to Sestriere.

The highway also stops in Oulx, but a municipal road leads to the village in 20 minutes.
