= Republic of the Escartons =

Collection of mountain territories located between Marseille and Turin

The Republic of the Escartons (Italian: Repubblica degli Escartons; French: République des Écartons) was a collection of mountain territories located around Mount Viso in the Briançonnais, with territory between Marseille and Turin. It consisted of a set of mountain territories in what is now the French department of Hautes-Alpes, the Italian province of Turin and the province of Cuneo. It was named after its capital. Escarton corresponds to an Occitan term for a small region, and in French 'écarter' means 'to divide', specifically 'to divide taxes into quarters'.

The republic enjoyed fiscal and political privileges from the French and although not very large, it had more than forty thousand inhabitants. Every year the leaders of various countries forming the Republic met in council to elect a consul as its leader.

Guigues VII of Viennois conceded the inhabitants of Briançon a charter of liberty in 1244, which was confirmed as a grand charter on 29 May 1343 by his successor Humbert II of Viennois at Beauvoir-en-Royans – he signed it with 18 representatives of the Alpine valleys. This gave birth to the Escartons republic, made up of five separate valleys – Briançonnais, Oulx, Casteldelfino, Val Chisone, and Queyras. The charter was later confirmed by letters patent from all the kings of France from Charles V to Louis XVI – after the Treaty of Utrecht, this continued until 4 August 1789 for the parts of the Republic which remained French territory.
