= Sansicario =

Coordinates: 44°57′30″N 6°48′22″E

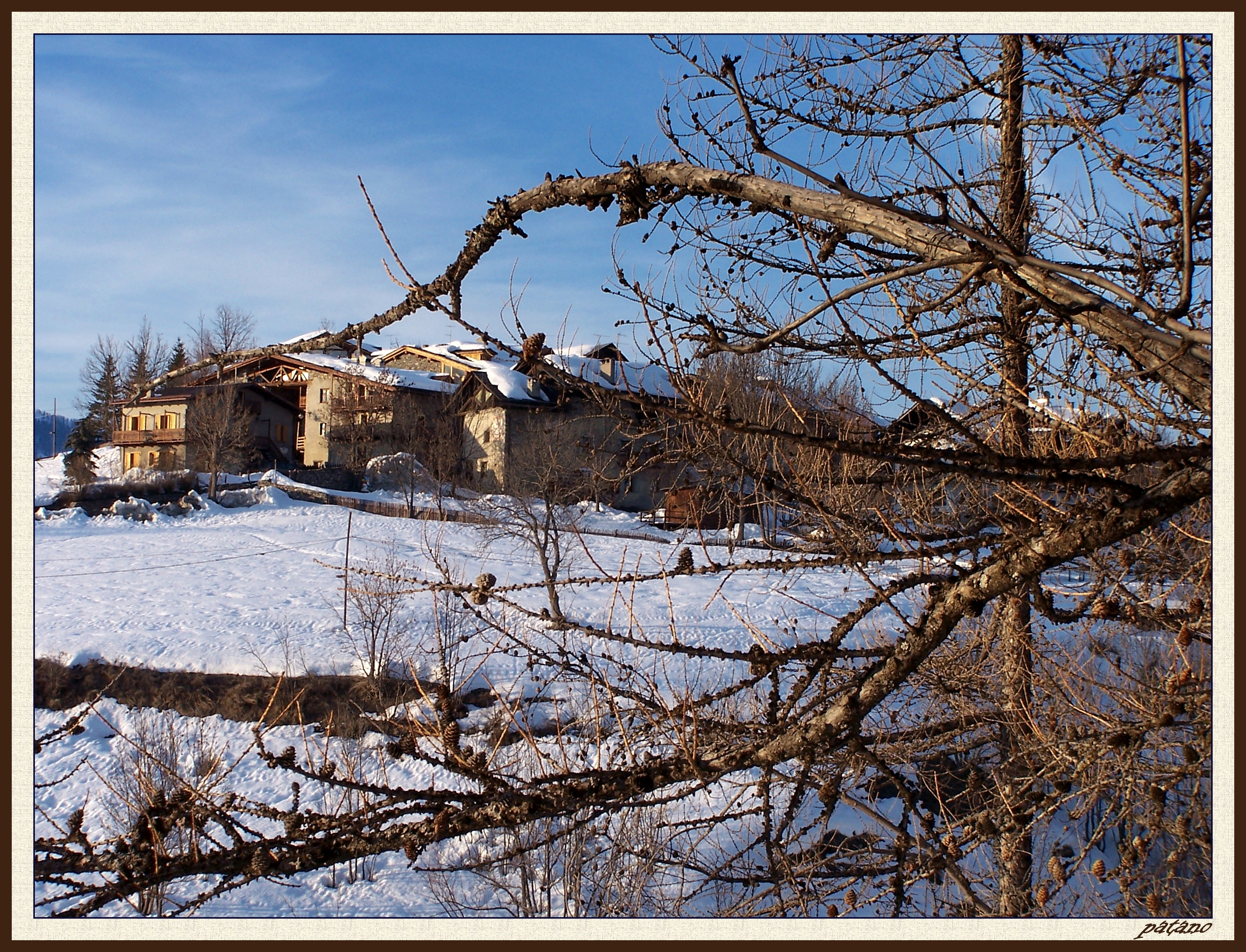

Sansicario (also spelled San Sicario) is a frazione of the comune of Cesana Torinese (Metropolitan City of Turin) in Piedmont, north-western Italy.

It lies at 1,700 m (5,600 feet) in the Val Susa and has a population of 93 people. It is a famous winter tourist resort. Part of the Via Lattea (Milky Way) skiing area.

At the 2006 Torino Winter Olympics, it hosted the biathlon, luge, skeleton, bobsled, and also the Women's' Downhill and Super-G Alpine skiing races.

It is ultimately unknown how Sansicario came to derive its name from the saint. Even so, the original church in the area was dedicated to a certain Saint Sicarius, and the village appears to have taken its name from that dedication. In French it was known as Saint Sicaire (and Saint Sicary in the local Occitan dialect). After the 1713 Treaty of Utrecht divided the Republic of the Escartons—leaving the western escartons (including Briançon and Queyras) with France and transferring the eastern Escarton of Oulx to the Duchy of Savoy—the name was gradually Italianized, eventually becoming Sansicario.
