= Gignoux Lake =

Lake in France

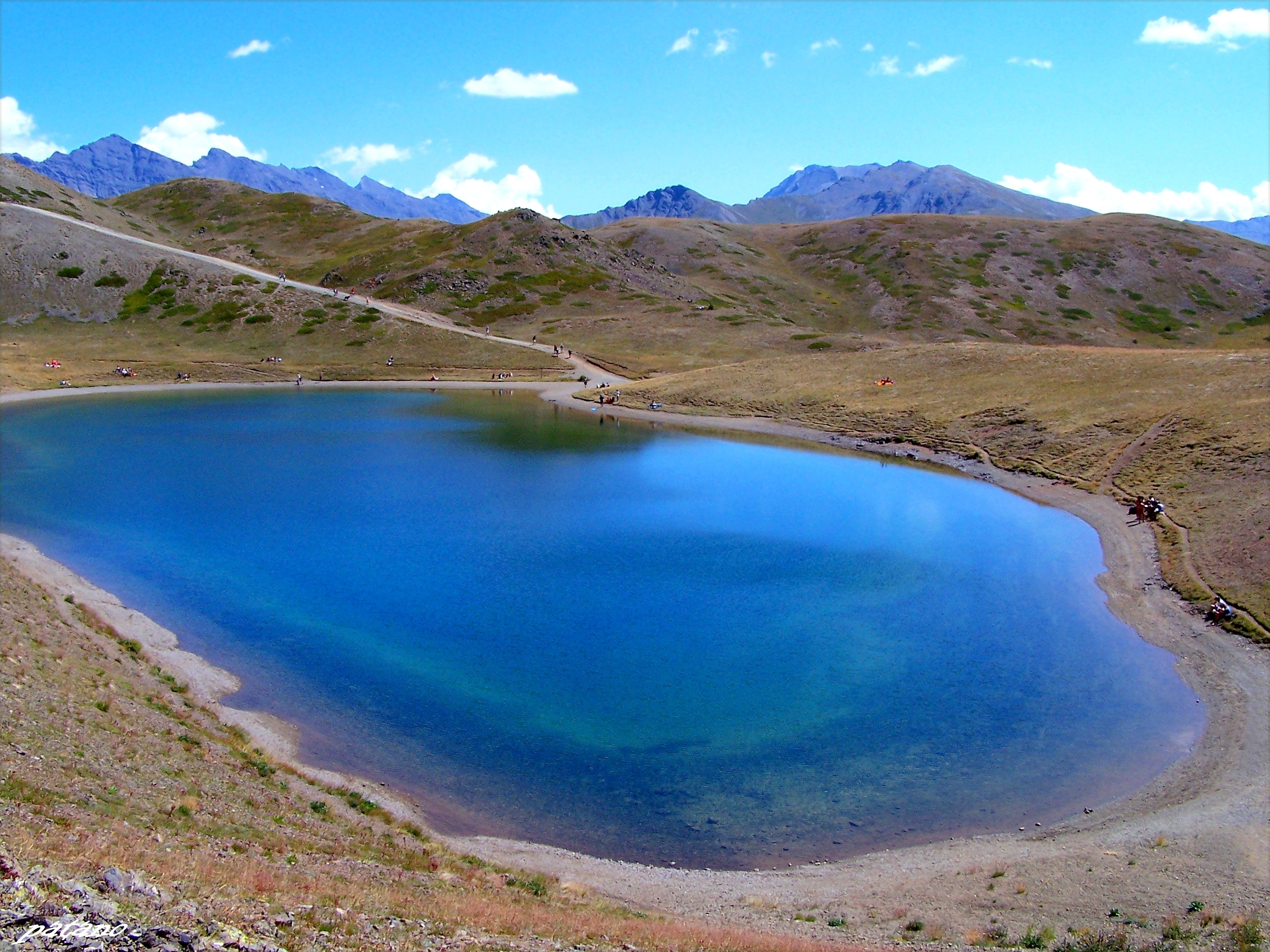
- Interactive map of Gignoux Lake
- Location: France
- Coordinates: 44°54′01.81″N 6°45′57.92″E

Gignoux Lake (Occitan: Lac de Gignoux) (2329 m above sea level), also known as the Seven Colors Lake, is located in France in the Provence-Alps-French Riviera region at the border with the Susa Valley (Piedmont) territory. The lake is in the French department of the Upper Alps, to the east of Mount Chenaillet (2650 m a.s.l.) and to the north of the Cerveyrette Valley.

== Characteristics ==
The lake covers an area of about 2 hectares. The Cima Saurel (2449 m a.s.l.) and the Mount Gimont (2648 m a.s.l.) form the northern side of the lake and are part of the border with Italy. The lake is set in an arid landscape with a view of Cervières (1620 m a.s.l.), the Chaberton (3 131 m a.s.l.) and the Fonts Valley.

=== Geology of the lake ===
Gignoux Lake is located in a habitat formed by scree and moraine. With basalt and gabbro outlining an oceanic crust, a sign of a deep (3,000 m) and ancient ocean (150 million years ago): the Ligurian Tethys also called the Piedmont-Liguria Ocean (a paleo-ocean).

== Fauna and flora ==
The site has 14 important plant species. Among these, 4 are protected nationally and 7 only in the Provence-Alps-French Riviera region:

- Mud sedge (Carex limosa)
- Sweet grass (Hierochloe odorata)
- Aethionema thomasianum
- Lesser Bladderwort (Utricularia minor)
- Water pesse (Hippuris vulgaris)
- Berardia (Berardia subacaulis)
- Rolland's bulrush (Trichophorum pumilum)
- Artemisia atrata
- Androsace septentrionalis
- The Alpine mock privet (Chamorchis alpina)
- Alpine water lentil (Potamogeton alpinus)
- Cardamine Plumieri (Cardamine plumieri)
- Two-stemmed carex (Carex diandra)
- Alpine rush (Trichophorum alpinum)

=== Fauna of the territory ===
Among mammals, the most present species is the deer. Among nesting bird species, there are the common quail, the Ortolan bunting, the rock partridge and the black grouse.

== See also ==
- Provence-Alps-French Riviera
- Upper Alps
- Susa Valley
- Cerveyrette

== Notes ==
1. ^ ^{a} ^{b} Il lago Gignoux (dei 7 colori) | Una meraviglia tra le Alte Alpi, su Zen Hikers, 29 agosto 2022. URL consultato il 29 agosto 2022.
2. ^ Le lac Gignoux, le lac Noir et le lac des Sarailles : randonnée dans la vallée de la Cerveyrette, su www.photos-provence.fr. URL consultato il 29 agosto 2022.
3. ^ Lac Gignoux (2329m) (Briançonnais, Hautes-Alpes), su www.lacsdemontagne.fr. URL consultato il 30 agosto 2022.
4. ^ ^{a} ^{b} Emeric DROUOT, Jean-Charles VILLARET, Luc GARRAUD, Stéphane BELTRA, Alisson LECLERE, Sylvain ABDULHAK, Lionel QUELIN, Sonia RICHAUD, Jérémie VAN ES, VERSANT ADRET DE LA CERVEYRETTE, DU LAC DES SARAILLES AUX TRAVERSES - VERSANT SUD-EST DU CHENAILLET (PDF).

== Other works ==
- Wikimedia Commons contains images or other files about Gignoux Lak
