= Cima Saurel =

Mountain of the Cottian Alps

- Cime de Saurel
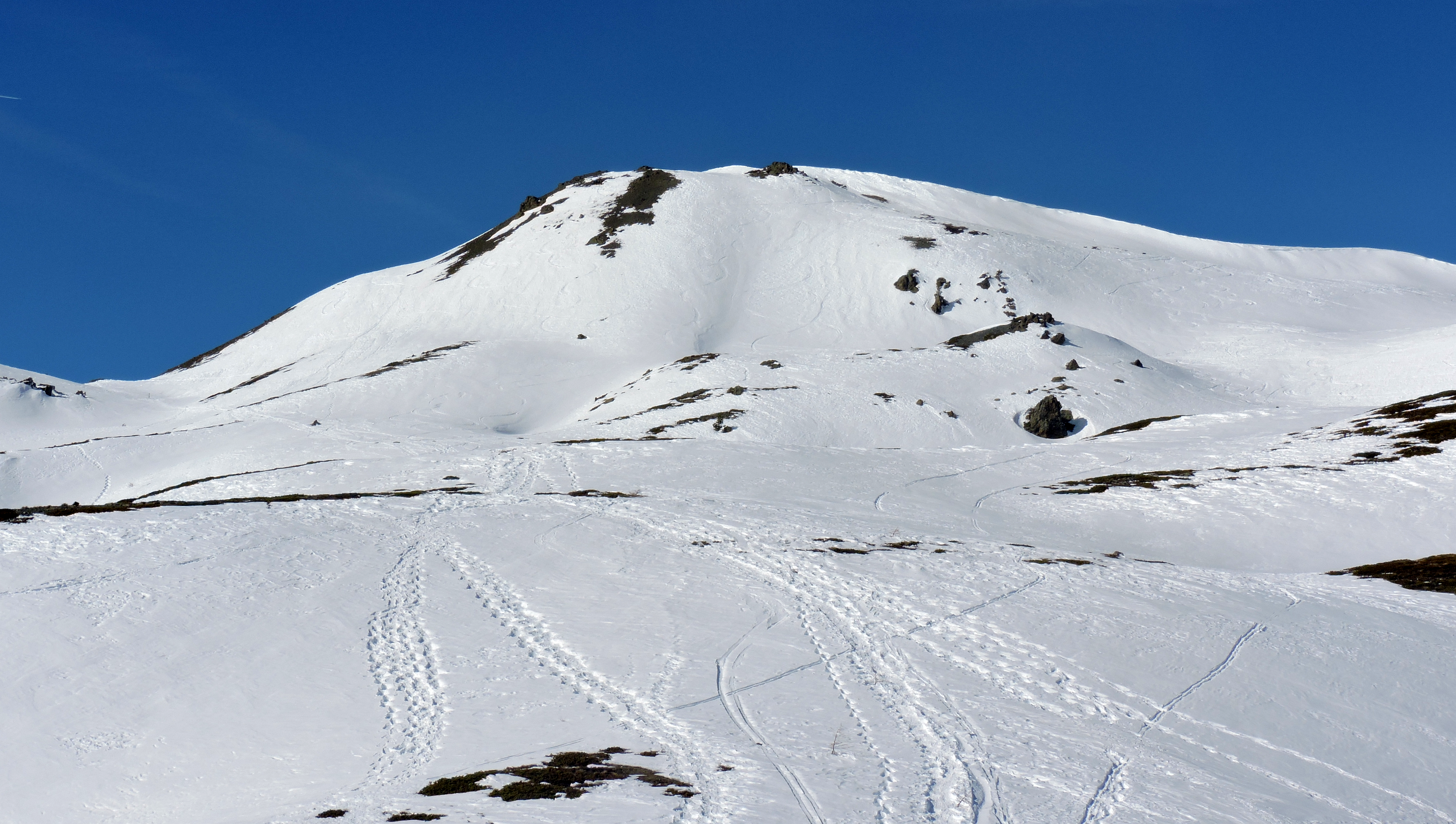
- View from the south

Highest point
- Elevation: 2,451 m (8,041 ft)
- Prominence: 76 m (249 ft)
- Isolation: 1.15 km (0.71 mi)
- Coordinates: 44°54′13″N 6°46′16″E

Geography
- Countries: Italy; France
- Region(s): Piedmont; Provence-Alpes-Côte d'Azur
- Parent range: Cottian Alps

The Cima Saurel (in French Cime de Saurel) is a mountain standing at 2,451 m above sea level. in the Montgenèvre Alps, part of the Cottian Alps. It is located along the border between Italy (Metropolitan City of Turin) and France (Hautes-Alpes).

== Description ==
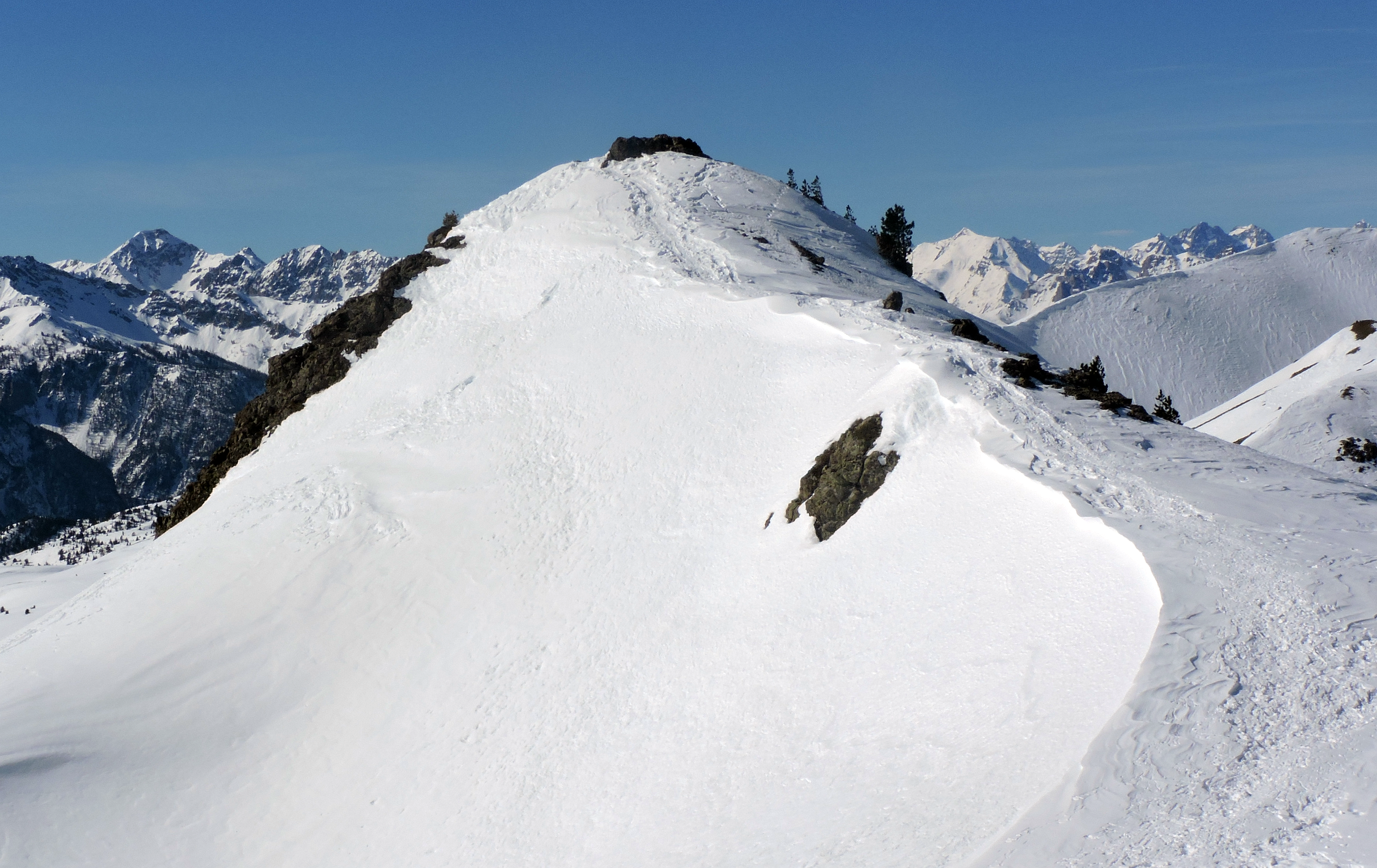
The mountain's subsidiary peak.

The mountain marks the meeting point of the Val Thuras (a side valley of the Susa Valley), the Gimont valley (a tributary of the Dora Riparia), and the valley of the Cerveyrette (a tributary of the Durance). Administratively, it is divided between the municipality of Cesana Torinese (Italy) and Cervières (France). At the summit, which is part of the main Alpine chain, there is a border marker indicating the France–Italy border. The highest point is flanked by a subsidiary peak located slightly to the northwest of the main summit. The main ridge continues northwest towards Monte Gimont and southeast towards Cima Fournier.

The ski lifts of the Via Lattea ski resort, originating from the Montgenèvre area on the northern slope of the mountain, reach a small pass located a short distance from the summit.

== Access to the summit ==
=== Summer ascent ===
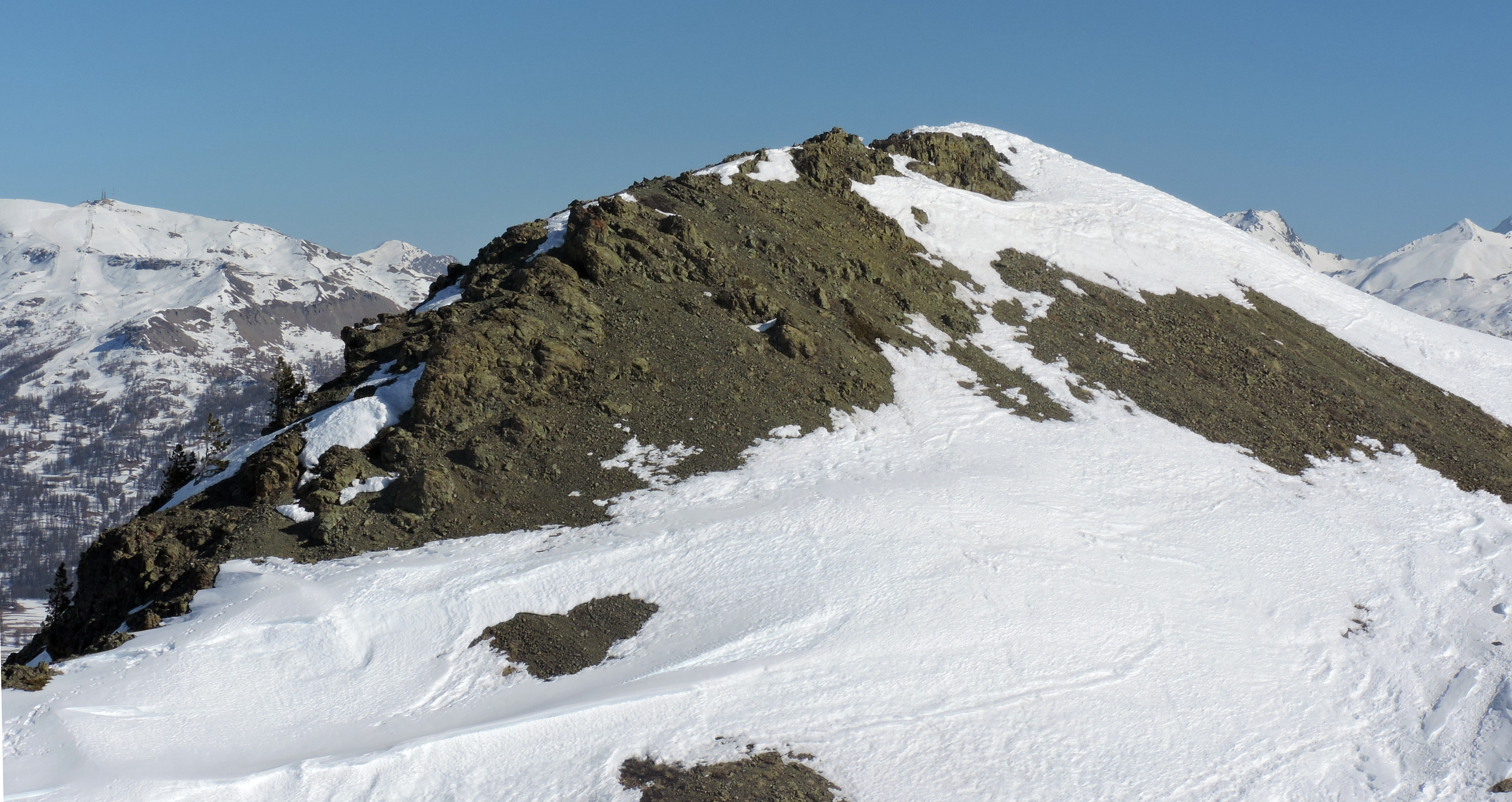
The summit seen from the subsidiary peak

The ascent from Lake Nero, which can be reached from Bousson via a dirt road, is rated as difficulty E

=== Winter ascent ===
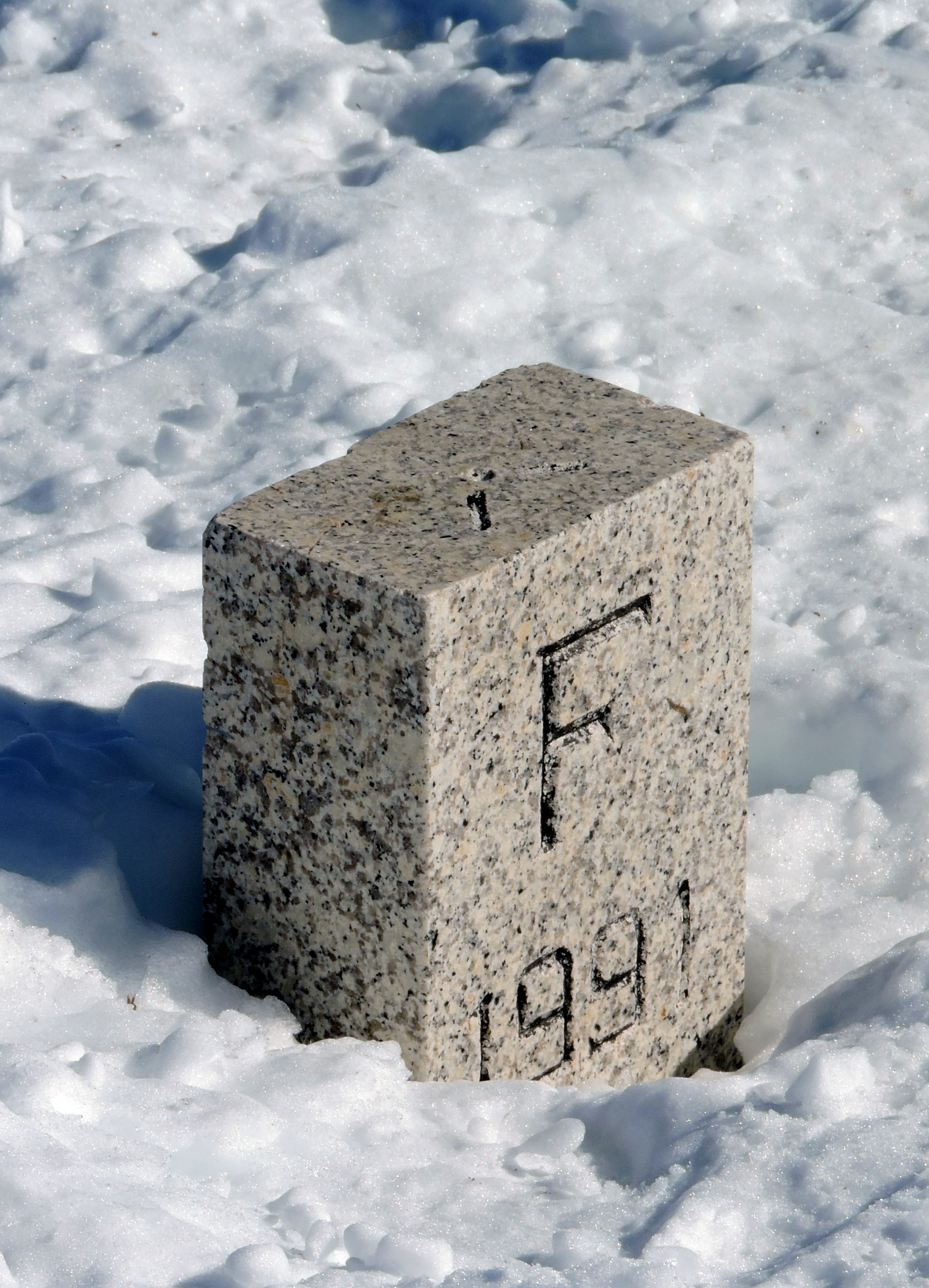
The border marker at the summit

The mountain is a classic destination for winter hiking with snowshoes as well as a ski mountaineering destination, which, due to the relatively low avalanche risk, may be suitable for times when more challenging destinations are deemed too risky.

== Support points ==
Capanna Mautino, located at 2,110 m above sea level, slightly northwest of Lago Nero

== Nature conservation ==
The Italian side of the mountain is part of the SIC named Cima Fournier e Lago Nero (code IT1110058), covering an area of 639 hectares.
