= Rhuilles =

Frazione in Italy

Coordinates: 44°54′25″N 6°50′0″E

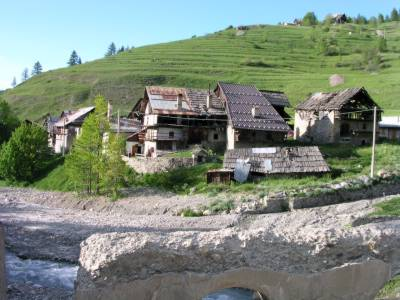
Rhuilles

Rhuilles is a frazione of the Italian comune of Cesana Torinese (province of Turin), located at 1,675 metres above sea level in the Val Thuras (upper Val di Susa). It is a tiny Alpine hamlet (pop. 4 in 2006) with characteristic grange (ancient agricultural baite in wood and stone). An old communal stone bread oven is to be found and a seventeenth-century chapel with a well-preserved wooden altarpiece.
