= Baita (architecture) =

Small dwellings of the Italian Alps and Apennines

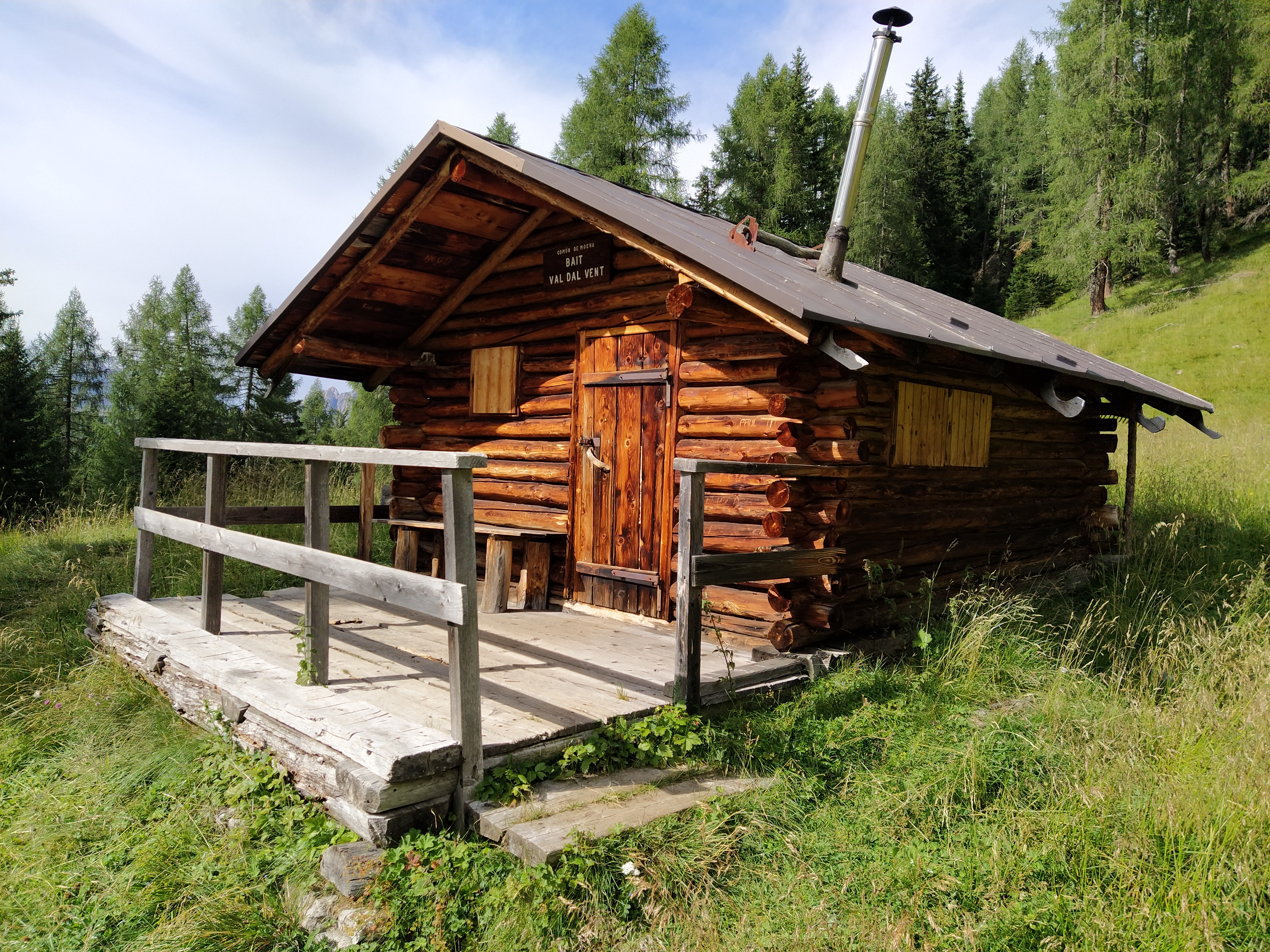
Baita in Moena

Baita (pl. baite) is a term used mainly in Italy and France to refer to small dwellings of the central and western Alps. This word is found from the Lepontine to the Maritime alpine sections.

== Description ==
Baite are huts which usually constructed with dry-stone walls, although wood may also be used. They are typically roofed with substantial stone slabs known as piodi (lose in the Western Alps) in order to withstand heavy winter snowfalls. A wood and stone baita of the Val di Susa – for instance in the hamlet of Rhuilles – and Hautes-Alpes is usually called a grange. Sometimes the term refers to modern and "rustic-chic" chalets.

Baite are often clustered together in Alpine pastures for seasonal occupation by herders tending sheep, cattle or goats during the summer transhumance.

Disused baite, restored with varying degrees of authenticity, have been used as second homes or holiday homes.

== See also ==
- Vernacular architecture
