= Sauze di Cesana =

- Comune
- Comune di Sauze di Cesana
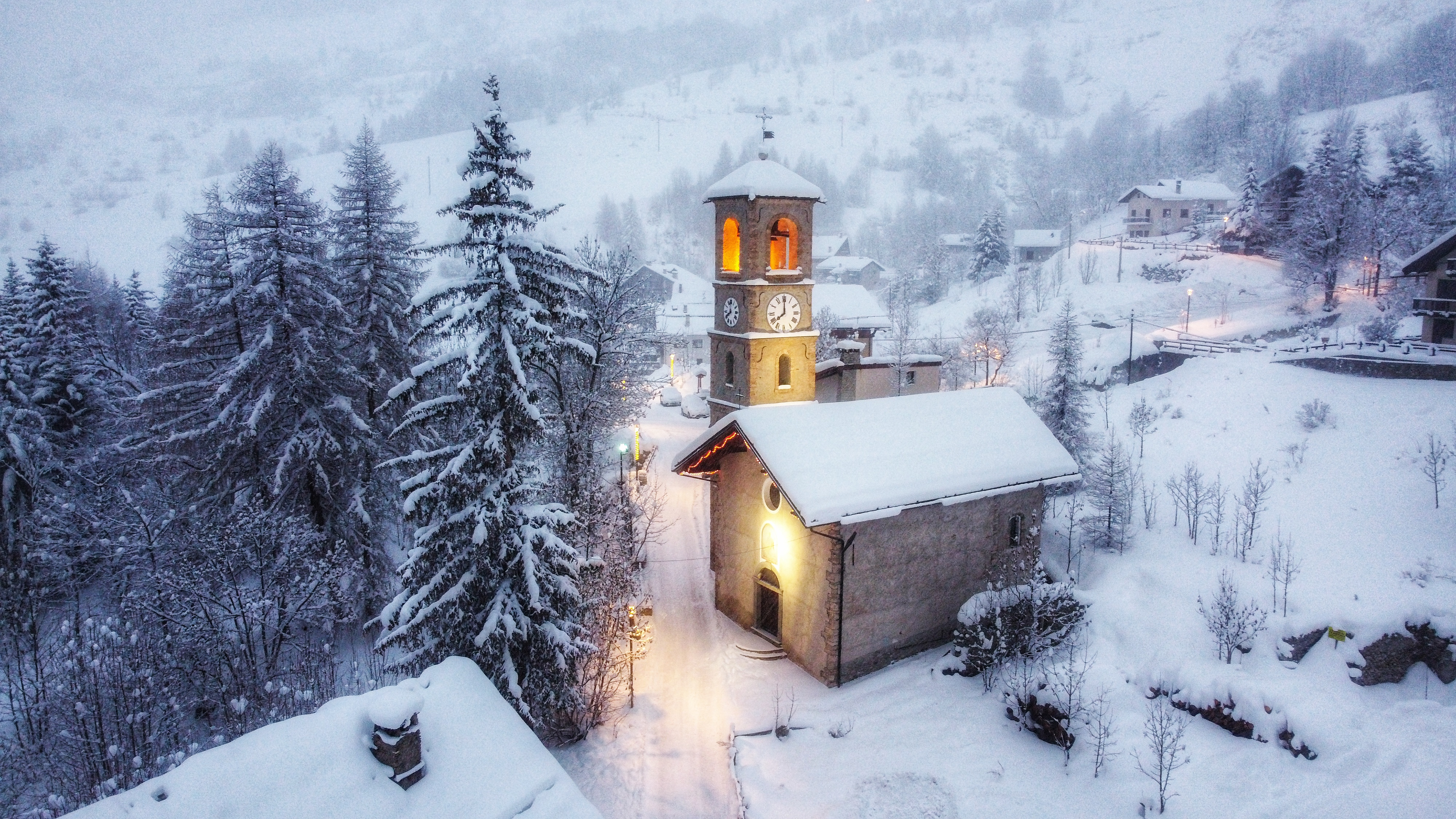

- Location within Italy Location within Piedmont
- Coordinates: 44°56′N 6°52′E
- Country: Italy
- Region: Piedmont
- Metropolitan city: Turin (TO)
- Frazioni: Bessen Bass, Bessen Haut, Grangesises, Rollieres

Government
  - Mayor: Maurizio Beria d'Argentina

Area
  - Total: 78.28 km^{2} (30.22 sq mi)
- Elevation: 1,560 m (5,120 ft)

Population (31 August 2018)
  - Total: 244
  - Density: 3.12/km^{2} (8.07/sq mi)
- Demonym: Sauzini or Sausini
- Time zone: UTC+1 (CET)
  - Summer (DST): UTC+2 (CEST)
- Postal code: 10054
- Dialing code: 0122
- Patron saint: St. Restitutus
- Saint day: Last Sunday in May
- Website: Official website

Sauze di Cesana (French: Sauze de Césane) is a comune (municipality) in the Metropolitan City of Turin in the Italian region Piedmont, located about 70 km west of Turin, on the border with France.

Sauze di Cesana borders the following municipalities: Abriès (France), Cesana Torinese, Pragelato, Prali, and Sestriere. Within the town is the Church of San Restituto, which was a strategic location during the time of the Dauphiné. In 1065 it was mentioned for the first time in the Bull of Cuniberto, archbishop of Turin.

== See also ==
- Punta Ramiere
