= San Sicario Fraiteve =

Skiing venue in Cesana, Italy

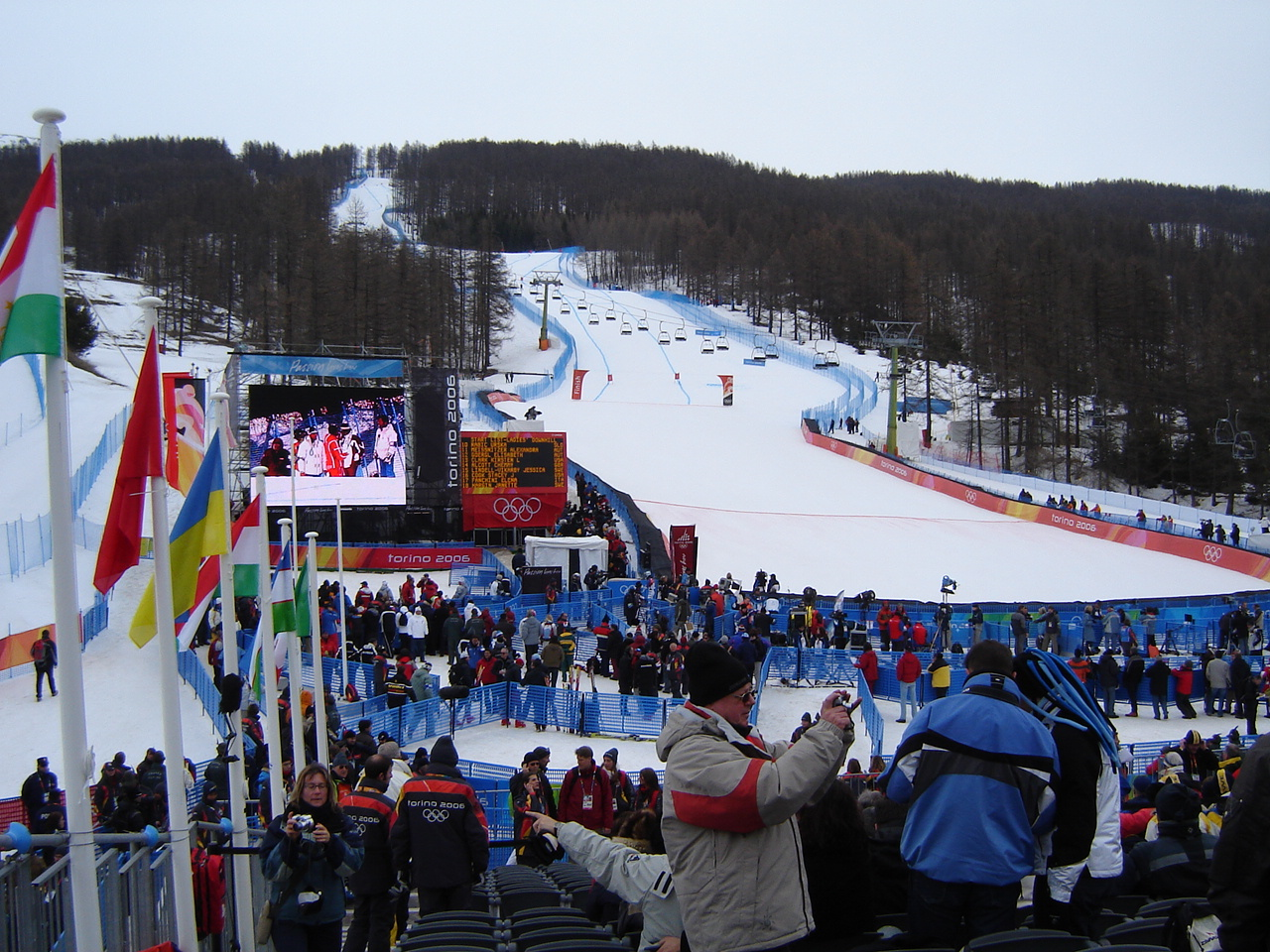

San Sicario Fraiteve is a venue built for the 2006 Winter Olympic. It seated 6,160 spectators, including 5,660 seated and 500 standing, for the women's alpine skiing downhill, super-G, and combined. The course has an overall length of 3.135 km (1.948 mi).

The venue is located in Cesana Torinese.
