= Punta Ramiere =

Mountain in Italy

- Bric Froid
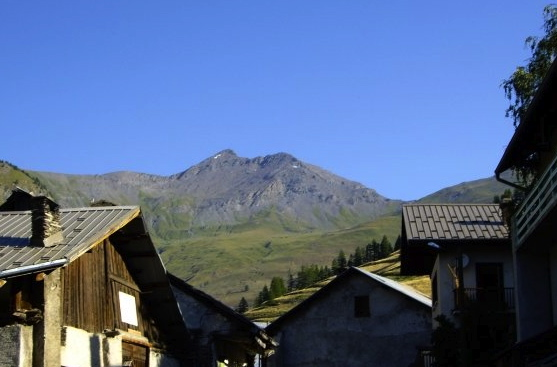
- The mountain seen from Le Roux d'Abriès

Highest point
- Elevation: 3,302 m (10,833 ft)
- Prominence: 673 m (2,208 ft)
- Parent peak: Pic de Rochebrune
- Isolation: 12.28 km (7.63 mi)
- Listing: Alpine mountains above 3000 m
- Coordinates: 44°52′08″N 06°55′55″E

Geography
- Location within Alps
- Location: Provence-Alpes-Côte d'Azur, France; Piemonte, Italy
- Parent range: Cottian Alps

Climbing
- Easiest route: from Colle Ramiere and NW ridge

The Punta Ramiere (in Italian) or Bric Froid (in French) is a mountain in the Cottian Alps belonging to the department of Hautes-Alpes (FR) and the province of Turin (IT). It's the highest peak of the long stretch of the Po/Rhone water divide starting from the Aiguille de Scolette (north) and ending with the Monviso group (south).

== Geography ==
The Ramiere is the tripoint at which the borders of the Italian comunes of Sauze di Cesana and Cesana Torinese and the French commune of Abries meet.

The geodetic point of the Italian Military Geographic Institute named Punta Ramiere (code 066104) is defined on the top of the mountain.

=== SOIUSA classification ===
According to SOIUSA (International Standardized Mountain Subdivision of the Alps) the mountain can be classified in the following way:

- main part = Western Alps
- major sector = North Western Alps
- section = Cottian Alps
- subsection = Central Cottian Alps
- supergroup = (It:Catena Bric Froid-Rochebrune-Beal Traversier/Fr:Chaîne Bric Froid-Rochebrune-Beal Traversier )
- group = (It:Gruppo Ramiere-Merciantaira/Fr:Groupe Bric Froid-Grand Glaiza)
- subgroup = (It:Gruppo della Ramiere/Fr:Crête du Bric Froid)
- code = I/A-4.II-B.4.a

== Access to the summit ==
The easiest route for the summit starts from Colle Ramiere (Ramiere pass, 3,007 m) and reaches the mountain top by its northwestern ridge. The pass can be attained by foothpat from the Thuras valley (Cesana Torinese) or the Argentiera valley (Sauze di Cesana).

== Nature conservation ==
The Punta Ramiere is located on the northern border of the French regional nature park of Queyras (Parc naturel régional du Queyras ), established in 1977.

== Maps ==
- Italian official cartography (Istituto Geografico Militare - IGM); on-line version: www.pcn.minambiente.it
- French official cartography (Institut géographique national - IGN); on-line version: www.geoportail.fr
