= Lake Nero (Cesana Torinese) =

Alpine lake in Cesana Torinese, Piedmont, Italy

- Lago Nero
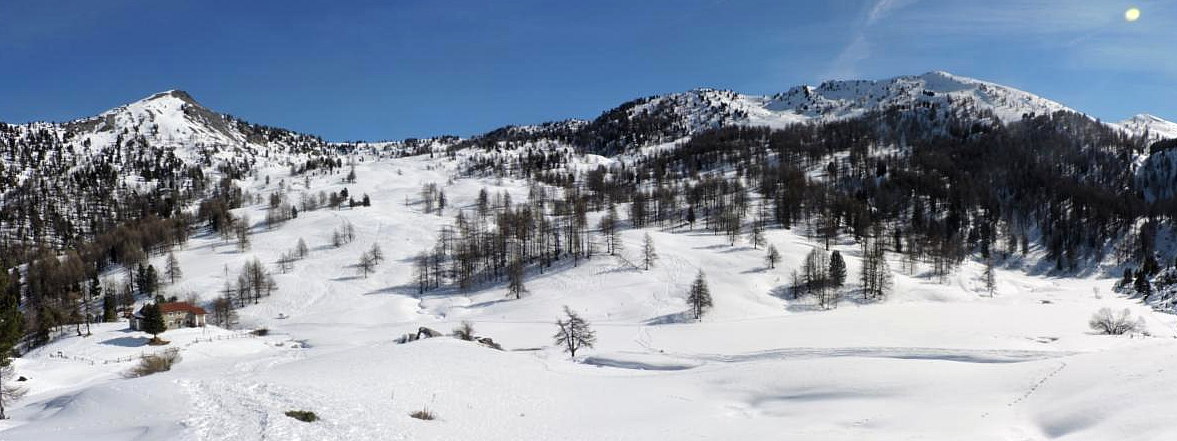
- The lake in winter
- Interactive map of Lake Nero
- Location: Italy
- Coordinates: 44.90108°N 6.79467°E
- Primary outflows: R. Servierettes

The Lake Nero is an Alpine lake situated at 2,070 meters a.s.l. in the municipality of Cesana Torinese within the Metropolitan City of Turin.

== Geography ==
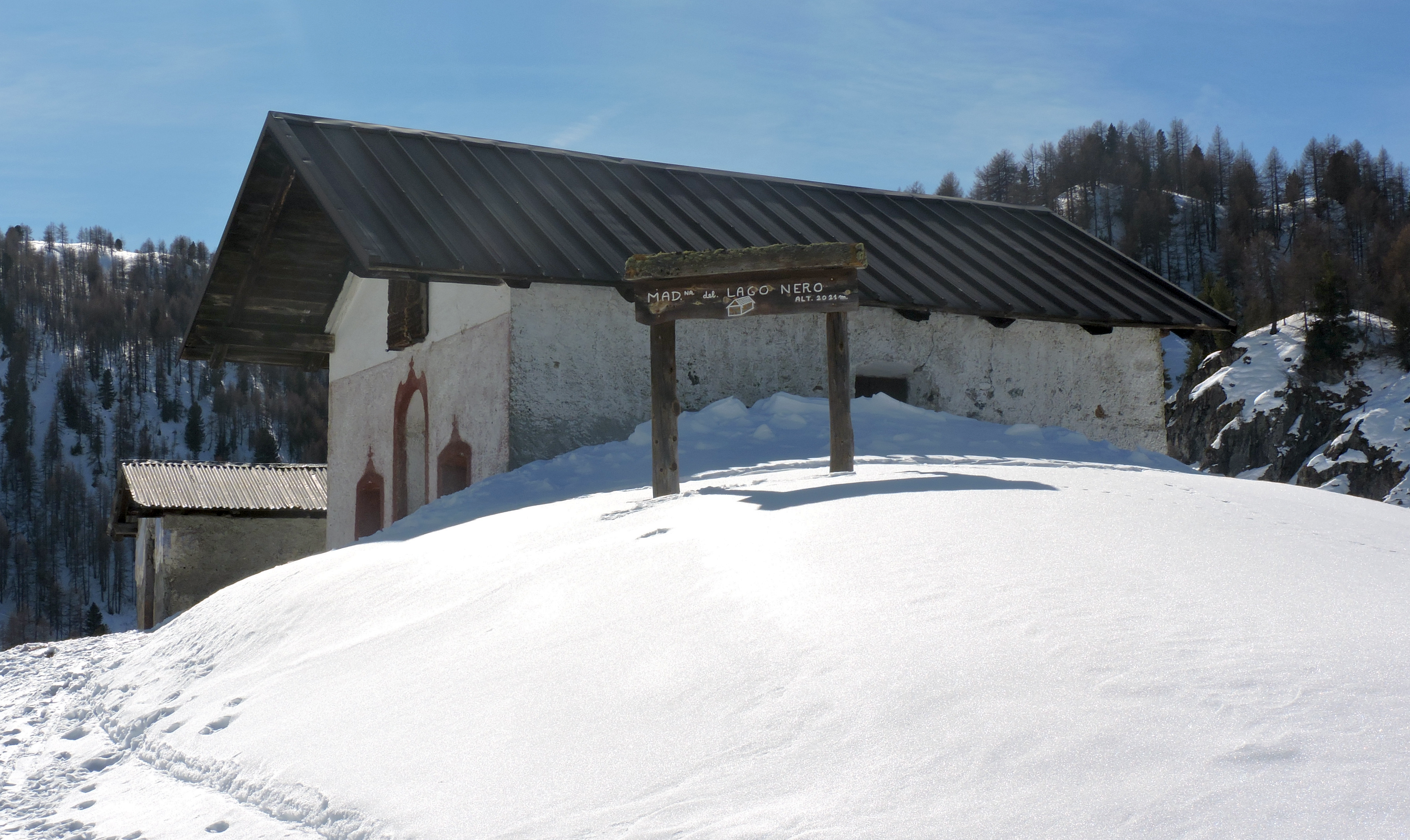
The Madonna del Lago Nero

The lake lies at the foot of Col Saurel, a few kilometers from the French border, and is accessible via an unpaved road from Bousson and Claviere.

Not far from the water’s edge stands a small sanctuary, the Madonna del Lago Nero, established between 1747 and 1840 and rebuilt in 1854 at the behest of Bousson’s residents.

Slightly uphill from the lake is a mountain refuge named Capanna Mautino, owned by the Sci Club Torino. This refuge serves as a base for summer or winter ascents to nearby peaks such as Mount Corbioun, Fournier Peak, or Saurel Peak.

== Nature Conservation ==
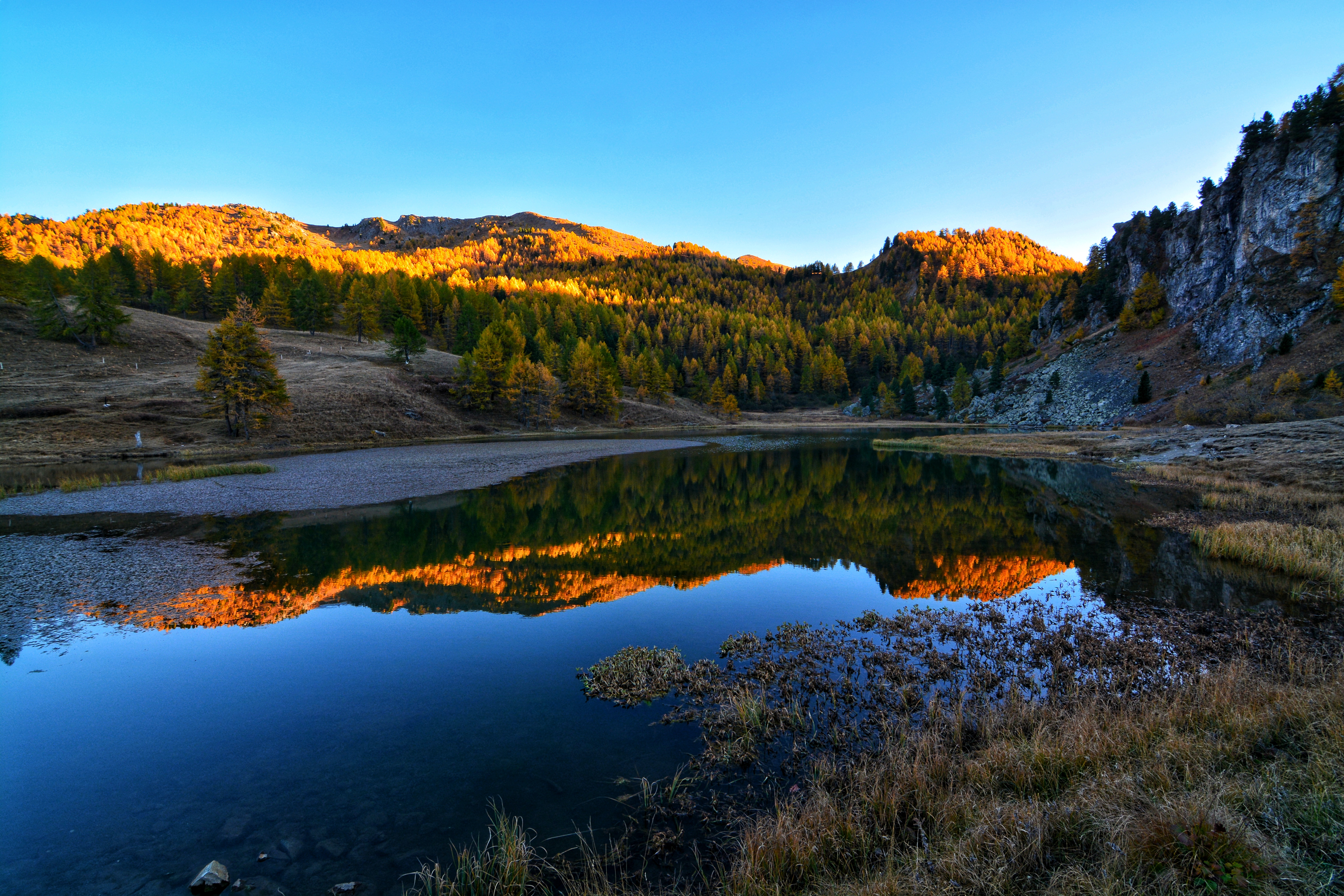
The lake in autumn

The lake is part of the SIC designated as Cima Fournier e Lago Nero (code IT1110058), spanning 639 hectares.
