= Mount Chenaillet =

Mountain in France

- (in French) Le Chenaillet
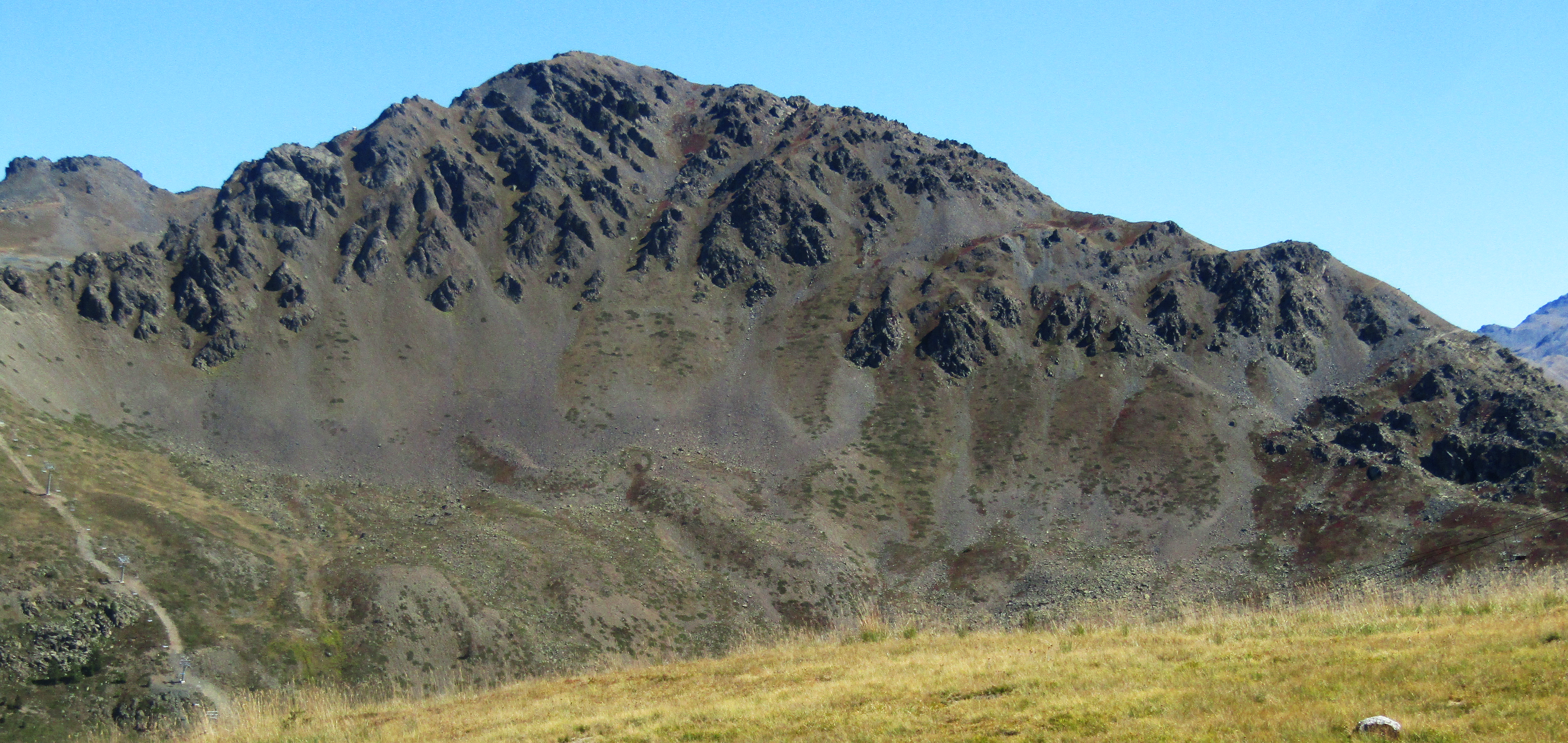
- W face of the mountain

Highest point
- Elevation: 2,650 m (8,690 ft)
- Prominence: 496 m (1,627 ft)
- Listing: Alpine mountains 2500-2999 m
- Coordinates: 44°54′01″N 6°44′31″E

Geography
- Location within Alps
- Location: Provence-Alpes-Côte d'Azur, France
- Parent range: Cottian Alps

Climbing
- Easiest route: Hike

The Mount Chenaillet (in French Mont Chenaillet or Le Chenaillet) is a 2,650 metres high mountain of the Cottian Alps, located on the Main chain of the Alps South of the Col de Montgenèvre.

== Geography ==
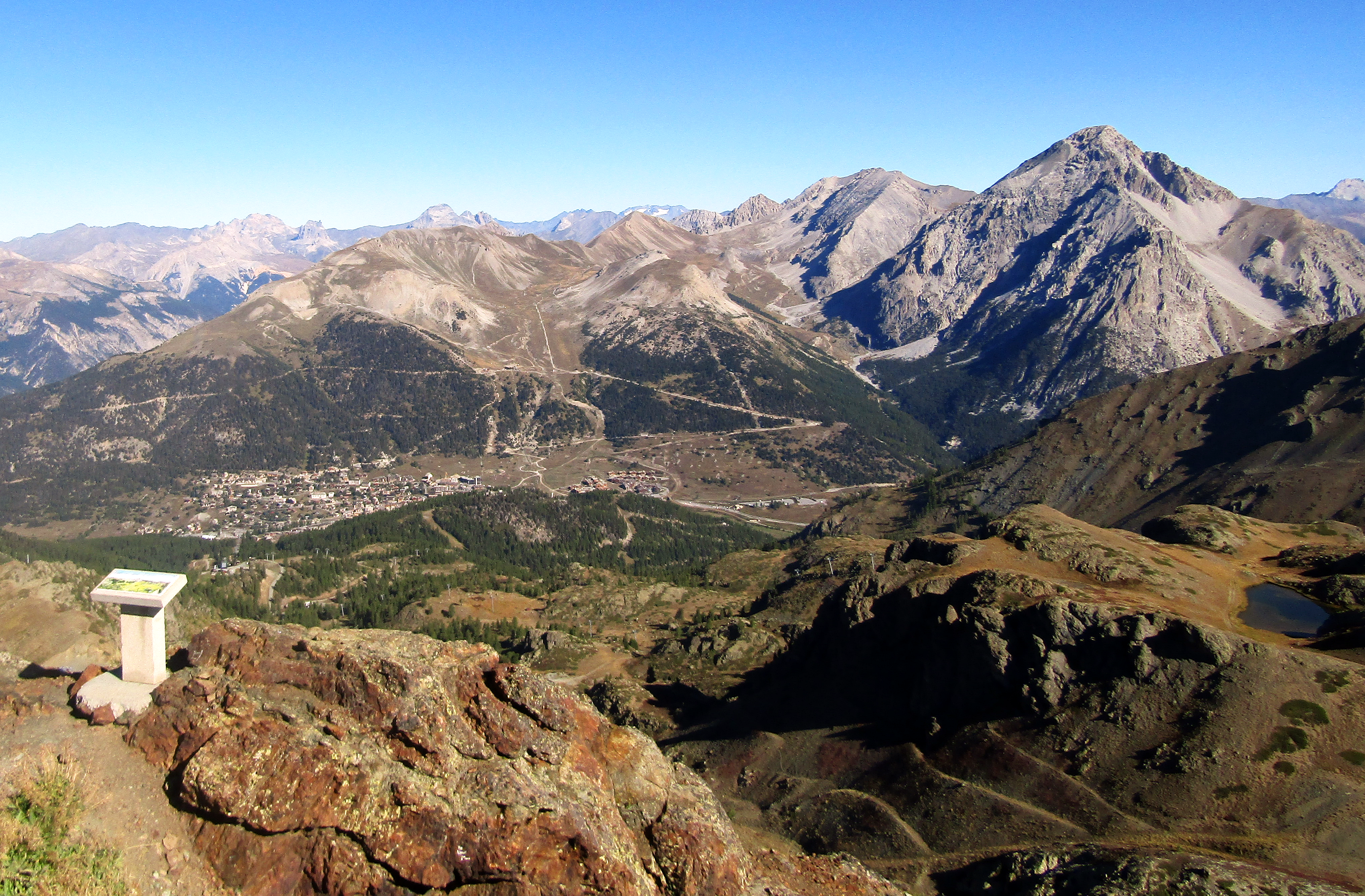
Panorama from the summit with Montgènevre and, on the right, the Chaberton

Administratively the mountain belongs to the French department of Hautes-Alpes close to the French-Italian border. On its summit the Susa Valley (tributary of the river Po) meets the valleys of the Durance (tributary of the Rhone) and of the Cerveyrette, the latter tributary of the Durance. The Main chain of the Alps connects northwards the Chenaillet to the Col de Montgenèvre, while towards NE it goes with the Monte Gimont. From the Chenaillet branches out from the main ridge a secondary chain dividing the valley of the Durance from the Cerveyrette one, which continues with the Sommet des Anges and the Sommet Château Jouan. Both the Durance and the Piccola Dora (an upper branch of Dora Riparia) have their sources on the slopes of the Chenaillet.

== Geology ==
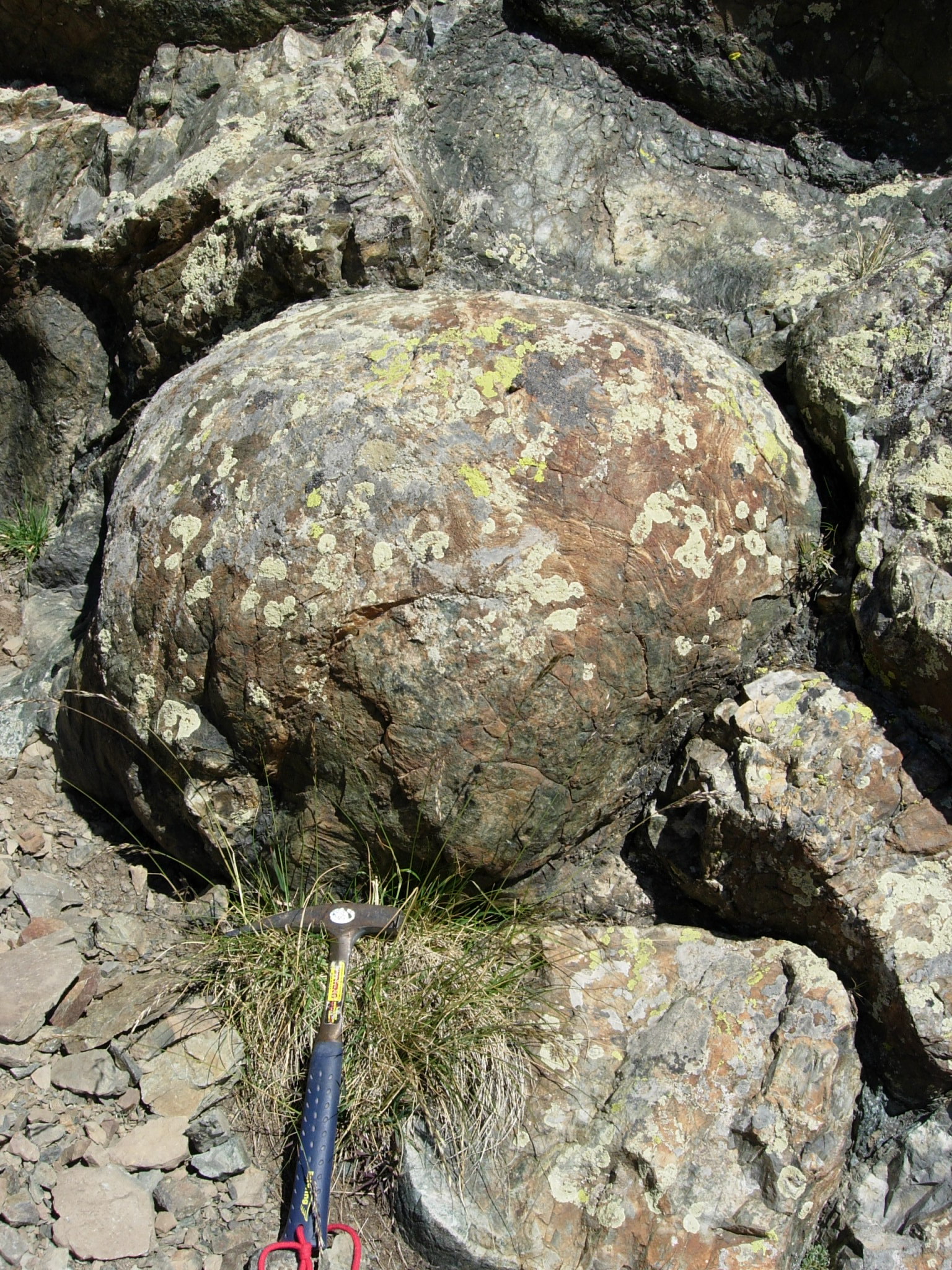
Pillow lava on the slopes of Chenaillet.

The Chenaillet is a geological curiosity, being an ancient submarine volcano as old as 155 million years, which was uplifted to its present location during the Alpine orogeny. On the slopes of the Chenaillet are well distinguishable pillow lavas and ophiolite rocks. These features are explained on a geological footpath reaching the summit of the mountain by some didactic panels both in French and in Italian.

The Chenaillet Ophiolite is composed of three main regions. The top of the ophiolite is composed by pillow basalts, underneath the pillow basalts there are mafic intrusive rocks, and below those are metamorphic rocks.

The Chenaillet Ophiolite is evidence of subduction related processes that helped build the Alps Mountain Range. The abundant presence of low grade metamorphic minerals led researchers to believe that subduction in the area was shallow. However, a recent study showed that there are a few high grade metamorphic minerals present in the gabbro region of the ophiolite, specifically lawsonite and omphacite. The presence of these high pressure metamorphic minerals suggests that subduction in the area is much deeper than previously though and has caused researchers to reevaluate their models for subduction in the Western Alps.

== History ==
The mountain up to the end of the II World War was on the Franco-Italian border. Due to its prominent position overlooking the Col de Montgenèvre, from Louis XIV times until the ligne Maginot, the area was heavily fortified. On 23-6-1940 an Italian offensive conquered the mountain and also in 1944 it was the theater of heavy fights between German-Italian and French-Moroccan troops; and after many decades it is still possible to find howitzer chippings on the ground. After the end of the war, following the Paris Peace Treaties signed in February 1947, the border was modified and Mount Chenaillet is now totally in France.

== Access to the summit ==
The summit of the Chenaillet can be reached by footpath from several starting points. The way from the Col de Montgenèvre is considered quite an easy hike.

== See also ==
- Monte Gimont

== Maps ==
- French official cartography (Institut géographique national - IGN); on-line version: www.geoportail.fr
