= Monte Gimont =

Mountain in Italy and France

- Grand Charvia (French)
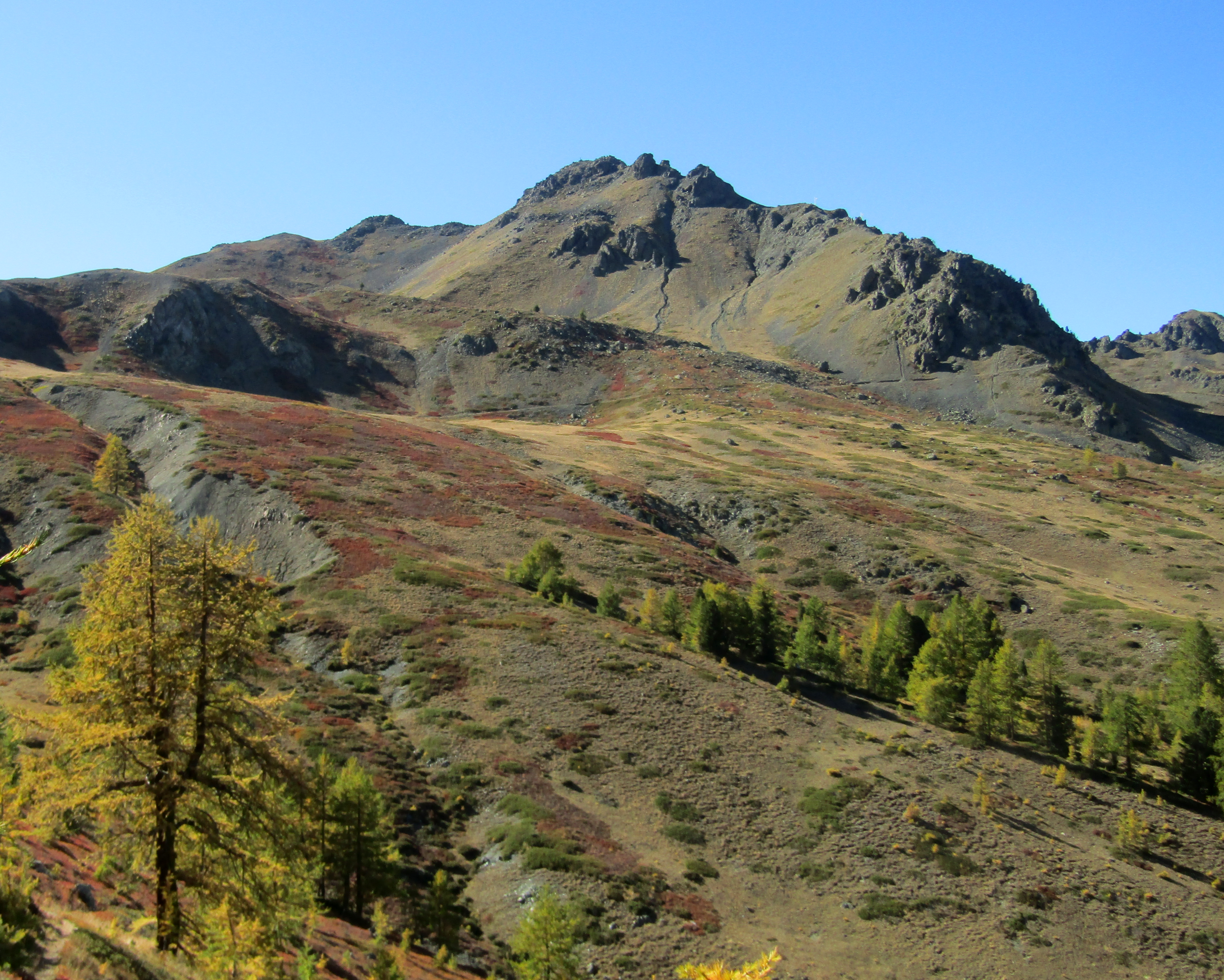
- View from the Gimont Valley

Highest point
- Elevation: 2,646 m (8,681 ft)
- Prominence: 129 m (423 ft)
- Coordinates: 44°54′20″N 6°45′08″E

Geography
- Location within Italy
- Location: Piedmont, Metropolitan City of Turin; Provence-Alpes-Côte d'Azur, Hautes-Alpes
- Countries: Italy and France
- Parent range: Cottian Alps

Mount Gimont (French: Grand Charvia) is a mountain 2,646 m above sea level in the Montgenèvre Alps, in the Cottian Alps. It is located on the border between Italy (Metropolitan City of Turin) and France (Hautes-Alpes).

== Description ==
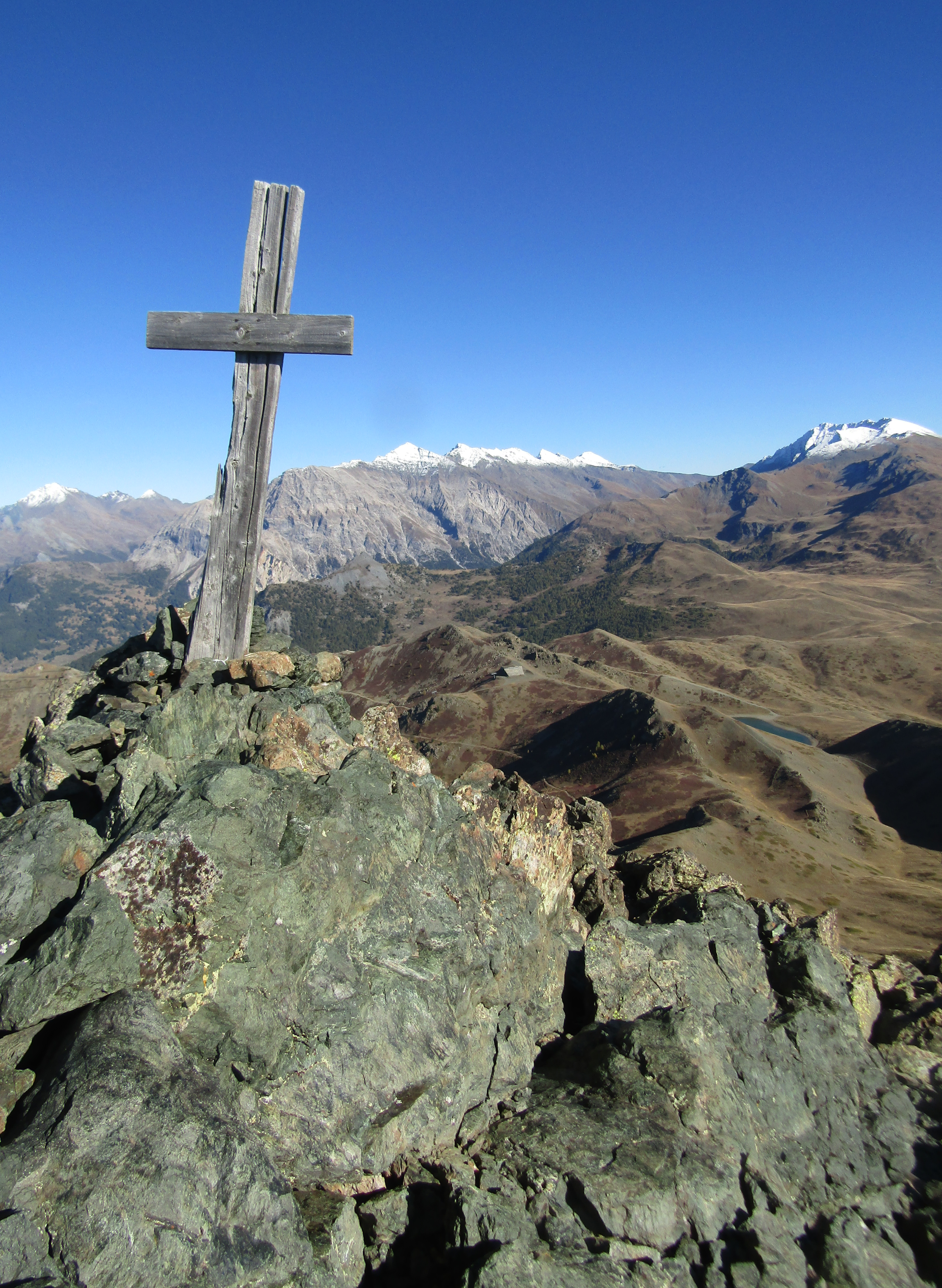
The summit cross

The mountain forms the meeting point between the Little Dora valley (to the northwest), the Gimont valley (to the northeast, a tributary of the Little Dora) and, to the south, the valley from the Cerveyrette (a tributary of the Durance). Administratively, it is divided between the Italian municipality of Cesana Torinese and the French municipalities of Cervières and Montgenèvre. On the summit of the mountain, which is part of the main Alpine chain, is a rustic timber summit cross. The Green Collet (or Grand Collet, 2,519 m) and the Guignard Col (or Petit Collet, 2,440 m) divide it, along the northern ridge, from the Mont de la Plane[1] (or Sommet de la Loubatière, 2,545 m). The Main Alpine Chain continues to the southeast of the mountain with Col Gimont (2,403 m), then ascending to Cima Saurel. In the opposite direction, the main ridge continues with a pass at an elevation of 2,519 m not mentioned in cartography and then ascends to Mount Chenaillet.

The cable cars and ski slopes of the Via Lattea ski area, ascending from both the Claviere and Montgenèvre sides, arrive at the Colletto Verde, which is located not far from the top of the mountain.

== Geology ==
As in the case of nearby Mount Chenaillet, the rocks that make up the mountain are of igneous origin and were formed on an ancient seafloor that has now emerged. Among these since the late 19th century geologists have reported variolite, a volcanic rock similar to basalt, and diabase, also of lava origin but in this case with hypoabissal crystallization.

== History ==
The French toponym Grand Charvia comes from the Latin calvus, meaning denuded.

The valley of the Little Dora, comprised between Mount Ginmont and the Chenaillet, although hydrographically part of the Po basin, belonged to French territory even before the retouching of the borders made by the 1947 treaty after the end of World War II, as had been reaffirmed after some disputes in the 1814 Treaty of Paris.

Mt. Gimont, along with the surrounding area, was affected by the front line of World War II; artillery duels took place there in June 1941, then until April 1945 it was garrisoned by the Alpine Battalion "Tirano," which fell back to the plain from April 23.

== Access to the summit ==
=== Summer ascent ===
One of the routes to reach the top of the mountain runs through the Vallone Gimont, starting from Claviere. Its difficulty is rated E. It is also possible to climb to the summit with departure from Black Lake, which in turn can be reached from Bousson by a dirt road, with an itinerary also rated of difficulty E.

=== Winter ascent ===
The mountain represents a classic ski mountaineering destination. The winter ascent through the Gimont valley is considered BS.

=== Points of support ===
- Mautino Hut (2110 m, upstream of Black Lake)
- Gimont hut (2035 m, Gimont valley (Cesana Torinese)

== See also ==
- France–Italy border
- Cottian Alps
- Hautes-Alpes

== Bibliography ==
- Ferreri, Eugenio (1981). Alpi Cozie Centrali. Guida dei Monti d'Italia. CAI-TCI.
- Giuseppe, Piolti (1894). Contribuzioni allo studio della variolite del Mt. Gimont (Alta valle di Susa). Torino: Carlo Clausen.
- Gabriele, Lincio (1928). Ricerche litologiche e mineralogiche sul Gruppo del Grand Gimont: Alta valle della Dora Riparia. Città di Castello: Tip. Leonardo da Vinci.

== Cartography ==
- Official Italian cartography at scales of 1:25,000 and 1:100,000. Istituto Geografico Militare (IGM).
- French official cartography. Institut géographique national (IGN).
- Central Geographic Institute - Map of trails and shelters at a scale of 1:50,000, No. 1 Susa Chisone and Germanasca Valleys
