= Cesana Torinese =

- Comune
- Comune di Cesana Torinese
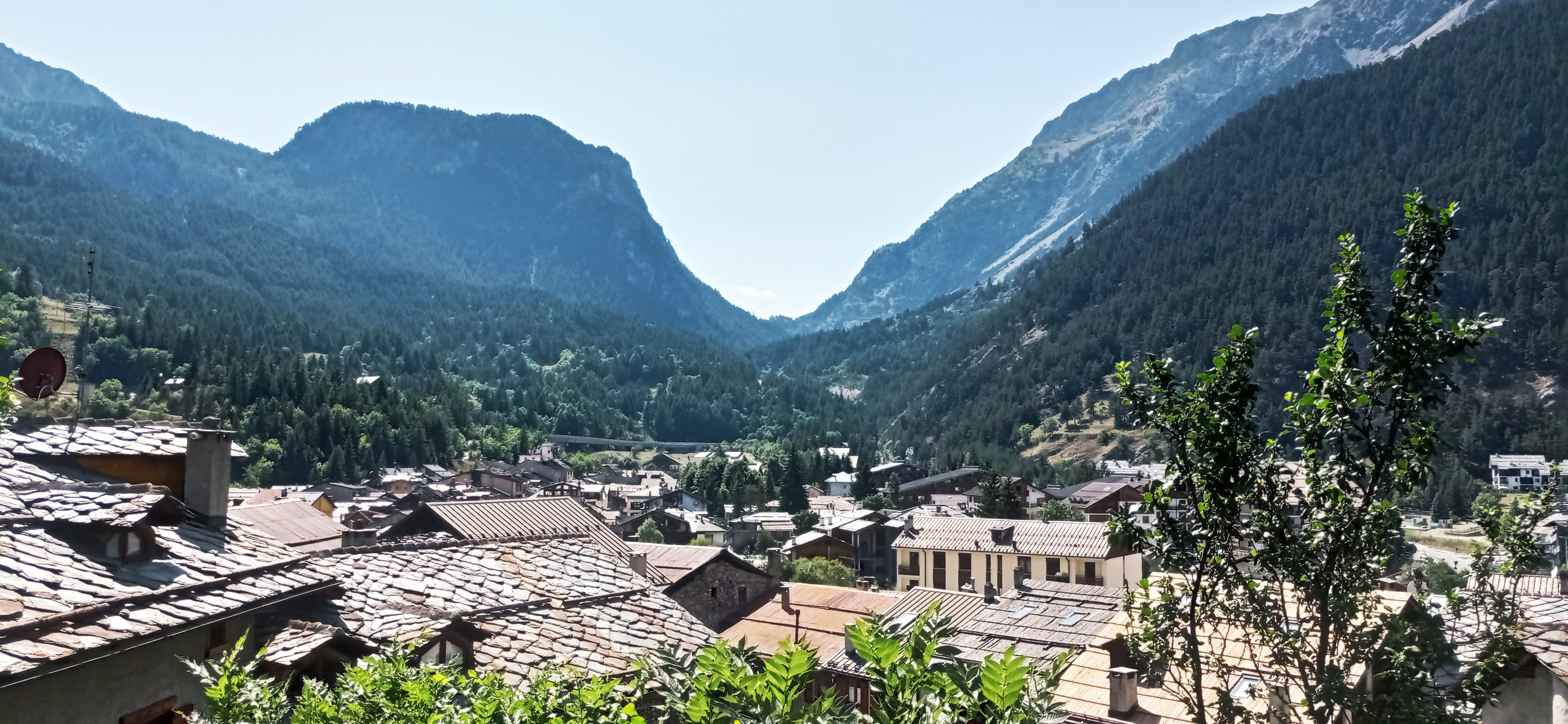

- Coat of arms

- Location within Italy Location within Piedmont
- Coordinates: 44°57′N 6°48′E
- Country: Italy
- Region: Piedmont
- Metropolitan city: Turin (TO)
- Frazioni: Bousson, Désèrtes, Fénils, Mollierès, Solomiac, Thures, Champlas Seguin, Rhuilles, San Sicario Borgo, San Sicario Alto, Pra Claud

Government
  - Mayor: Roberto Vaglio

Area
  - Total: 121.70 km^{2} (46.99 sq mi)
- Elevation: 1,354 m (4,442 ft)

Population (30 November 2017)
  - Total: 946
  - Density: 7.77/km^{2} (20.1/sq mi)
- Demonym: Cesanesi
- Time zone: UTC+1 (CET)
  - Summer (DST): UTC+2 (CEST)
- Postal code: 10054
- Dialing code: 0122
- Patron saint: St. John the Baptist
- Saint day: June 24
- Website: Official website

Cesana Torinese (French Césanne) is a comune (municipality) in the Metropolitan City of Turin in the Italian region Piedmont, located about 70 kilometres (43 mi) west of Turin, on the border with France. Cesana is a popular winter ski resort, being connected to both San Sicario/Sestriere and Claviere/Montgenevre via chairlifts and gondolas. A run connecting Sagnalonga Monti della luna to Cesana is currently being renovated and will be open from 2022. During the summer, Cesana is a popular holiday destination, famous for its many trekking and alpine lakes in the neighbouring areas.

== Geography ==
Cesana Torinese covers 12,130 ha and is bordered by the comune of Oulx on the north, France on the south, the comunes of Sauze di Cesana and Sestriere on the east, and the comune of Claviere and France on the west.

== History ==
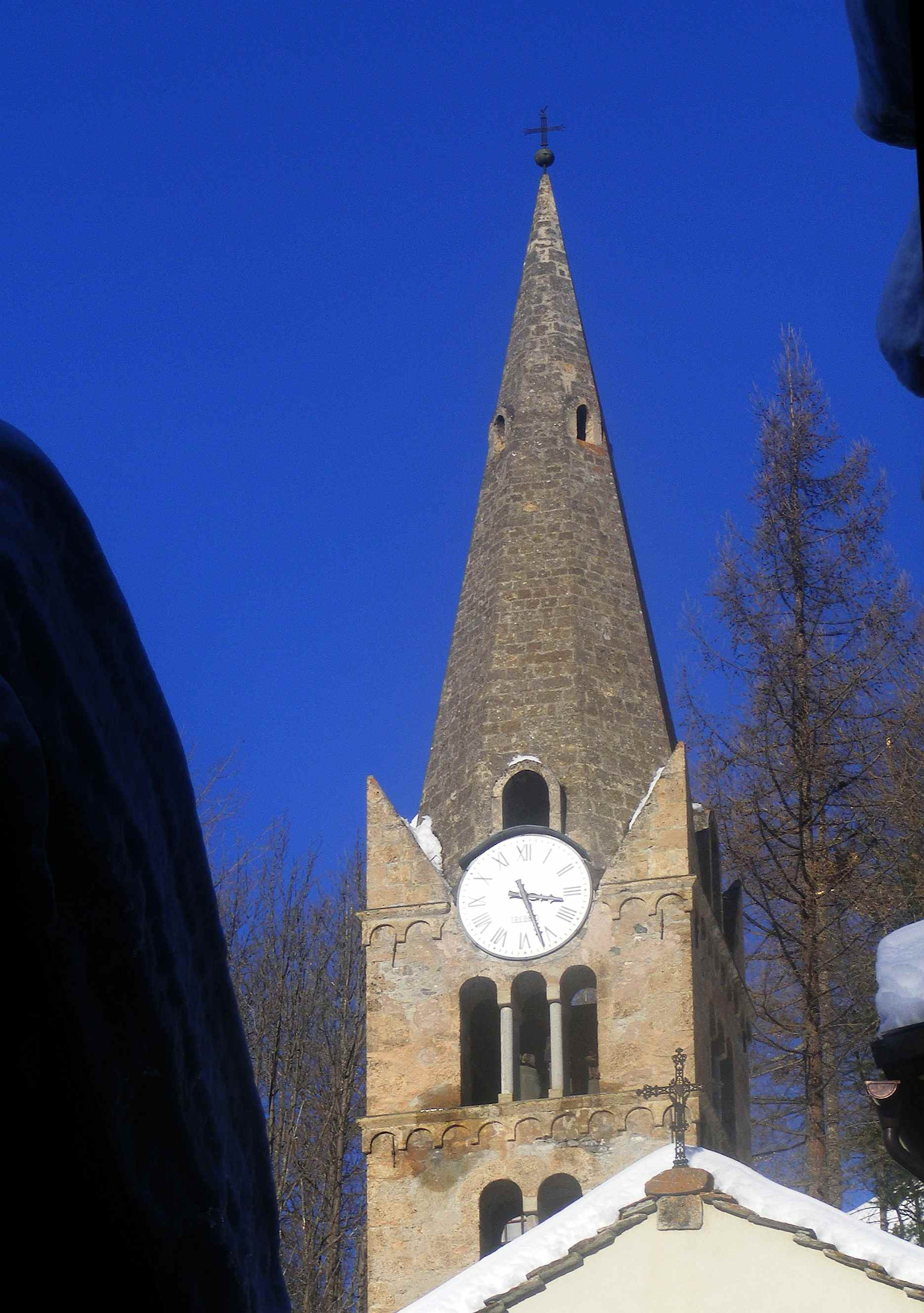
The church of Madonna della Neve

Cesana Torinese is sited on the route of the Roman road leading from the Po Valley to Gaul. During the Middle Ages the road lost its commercial importance but retained its military significance. Cesana was controlled by the counts of Albon and dauphins of Viennois until the second half of the 14th century, when he ceded the lands and title to France.

In 1155 Frederick I, Holy Roman Emperor authorised the dauphin Guigues V of Albon to mint silver coins in Cesana - from 1281 the coins bore the dauphins' symbol of a dolphin, which was also shown in all local coats of arms. In 1343, with the dauphins' concession, the Escarton Republic was born, on lands now divided between France and Italy. Cesana thus found itself in Escarton d'Oulx until 1713, when it was ceded to the Savoyard state by the Treaty of Utrecht.

Between the 14th and 17th centuries the Cesana valley was damaged directly and indirectly by the wars of religion, mainly fought against the "Waldensian heretics" in the Valle Chisone. During the War of the Spanish Succession (1701-1714) the territory was attacked and conquered by French troops. In the 18th century Cesana's strategic importance declined until an era when new roads were constructed and the town once again benefited from commercial traffic.

In 1928 some previously independent towns (Désèrtes, Bousson, Fenils, Mollières, Solomiac and Thures) were merged with that of Cesana. Cesana was one of the venues for the 2006 Winter Olympics, hosting the biathlon, women's alpine skiing, bobsleigh, luge and skeleton. It also hosted the biathlon for the 2007 Winter Universiade.

== Twin cities ==
- Reggio Calabria, Italy

== See also ==
- Punta Ramiere
- Lake Nero (Cesana Torinese)
- Cesana Pariol
- Cesana San Sicario
- Rhuilles
- San Sicario Fraiteve
- Sansicario
